= Proposed Alajuelense Stadium =

Stadium in Costa Rica

New Alajuelense Stadium
- Artist's impression of the proposed stadium
- Interactive map of New Alajuelense Stadium
- Location: Siquiares, Turrúcares, Alajuela, Costa Rica
- Coordinates: 9°57′59″N 84°17′45″W
- Owner: LD Alajuelense
- Operator: LD Alajuelense
- Capacity: 24,000

Construction
- Groundbreaking: 2023 (Planned)
- Built: Cancelled
- Opened: Cancelled
- Cost: $30 million

Tenant
- Alajuelense (Planned)

Liga Deportiva Alajuelense plans to build a new football stadium in Turrúcares, Alajuela that will serve as the team's home, replacing their current stadium, Alejandro Morera Soto. The stadium has a planned capacity of 24,000 all-seated. The stadium will be built next to the team's high-performance center.

The stadium will be built between early 2023 and late 2024, with the planned opening being around January 2025. The venue is yet to be named, and according to Alajuelense president Fernando Ocampo, the team is open to deal with companies for sponsor-based names.

== History ==
In June 2017, Alajuelense's president Fernando Ocampo reunited with the team's board of directors to discuss whether the team should renovate their current stadium or build a new one. At the time, the team was negotiating with the municipality of Alajuela to sell the Morera Soto stadium to them and build a new stadium, but the deal did not come to fruition.

In September 2018, the team were considering four options for the location of the then-hypothetical new stadium: Villa Bonita, El Coyol, downtown Alajuela or the Viva Park in Guácima. In 2018, two designs were proposed: One would see the stadium surrounded by buildings, while the other saw an oval-shaped stadium with roofs on three of the four stands.

On 8 April 2021, the team presented the project for the new stadium, a $30 million venue with a capacity of 24,000. A member's assembly held on 17 July 2021 saw the project receive the approval of over 85% of the team's affiliates.

== See also ==
- Estadio Alejandro Morera Soto
