= National Route 1 (Costa Rica) =

Highway in Costa Rica

National Primary Route 1
- Ruta nacional primaria 1
- Carretera Interamericana Norte (North Interamerican Road); Autopista General Cañas (General Officer Cañas Highway) segment Autopista Bernardo Soto (Bernardo Soto Highway) segment
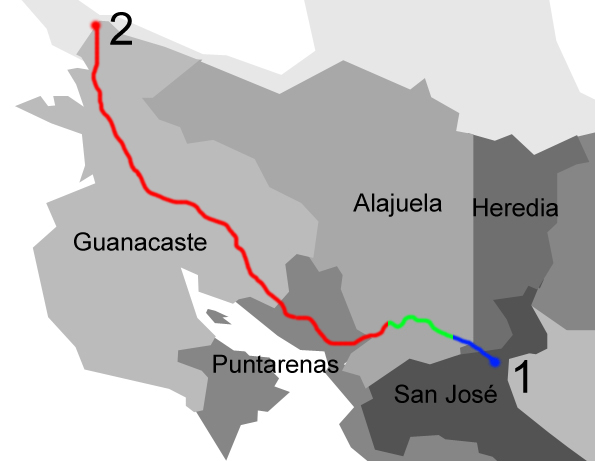
- Carretetera Interamericana Norte Autopista Bernardo Soto Autopista General Cañas

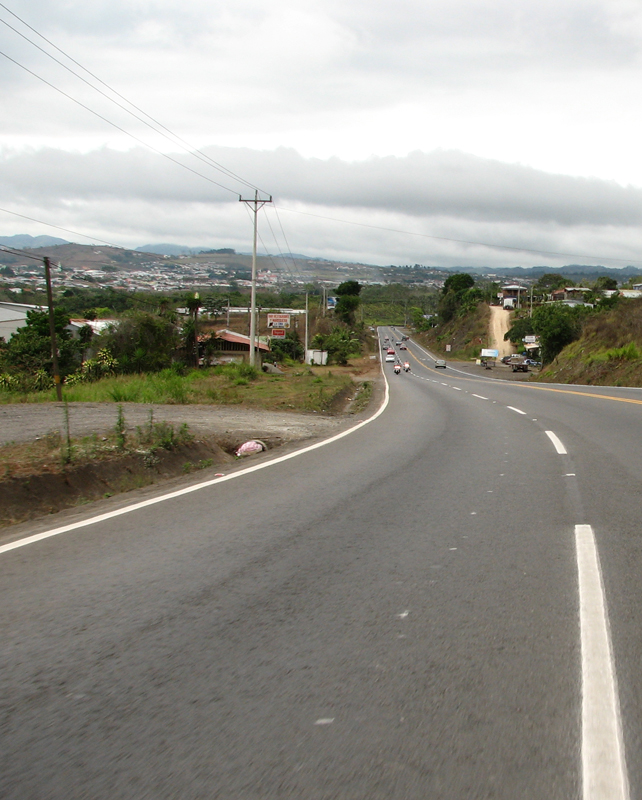
- Carretera Interamericana Norte near San Ramón canton, Alajuela province, Costa Rica. April 2007.

Route information
- Maintained by Ministry of Public Works and Transport
- Length: 290.065 km (180.238 mi)

Major junctions
- South end: Route 2
- Route 39 Route 3 (Juan Pablo II bridge); Route 106 (Castella Conservatory); Route 111 (Real Cariari shopping center); Route 129 (Bridgestone factory); Route 3 (Río Segundo); Route 153 (Alajuela); Route 27 (El Coyol arterial road); Route 3 (La Garita); Route 154 (Grecia); Route 135 (Palmares); Route 156 (San Ramón); Route 4 (San Carlos, under construction, 2005-2025) Route 913 (Santa Rosa National Park)
- North end: NIC-2

Location
- Country: Costa Rica
- Provinces: San José, Alajuela, Heredia, Guanacaste, Puntarenas

Highway system
- National Road Network of Costa Rica
← Route 39	→ Route 2

National Primary Route 1, formally known as Carretera Interamericana Norte (North Interamerican Road), is the northern segment of the Pan-American Highway (locally in Central America known as the Inter-American Highway) that traverses Costa Rica.

== Description ==
The road begins in the casco central (downtown, city center) districts of San José canton, just where Route 2 ends, at the east side of the La Sabana Metropolitan Park. Two segments of the route have the official names of Autopista General Cañas (General Officer Cañas Highway), between San José and Alajuela, and Autopista Bernardo Soto (Bernardo Soto Highway), between Alajuela and San Ramón.

In San José province the route covers San José canton (Merced, Hospital, Uruca, and Mata Redonda districts).

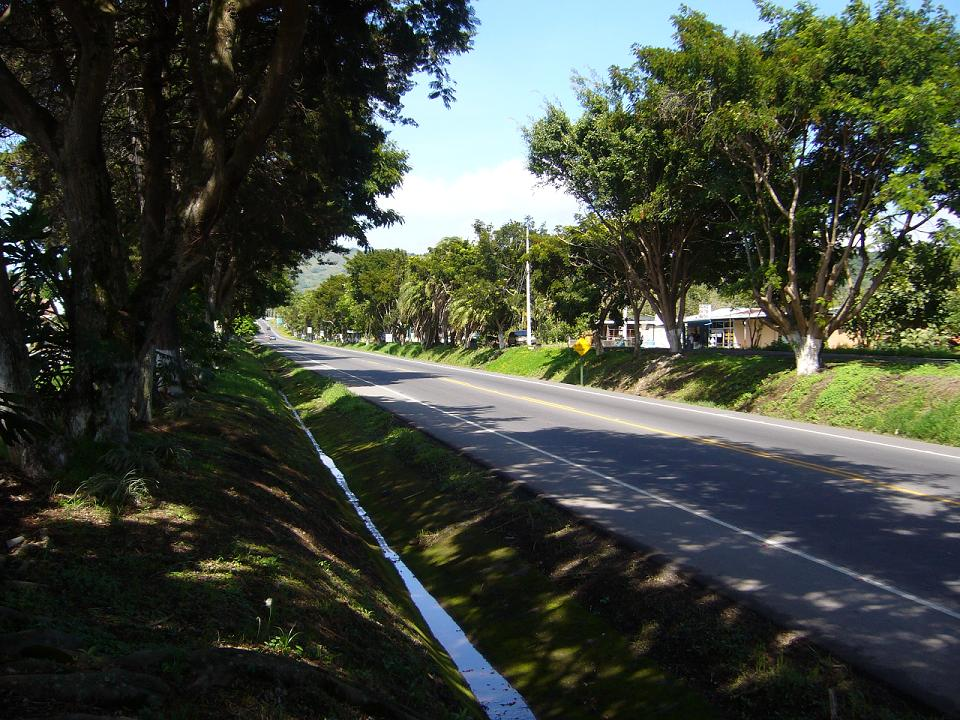
Bernardo Soto Highway in Palmares, Alajuela

In Alajuela province the route covers Alajuela canton (San José, San Antonio, Guácima, Río Segundo, Garita districts), San Ramón canton (Santiago, San Rafael, and San Isidro districts), Grecia canton (Tacares and Puente de Piedra districts), Naranjo canton (San Miguel and El Rosario districts), and Palmares canton (Buenos Aires and La Granja districts).

In Heredia province the route covers Heredia canton (Ulloa district) and Belén canton (La Ribera and La Asunción districts).

In Guanacaste province the route covers Liberia canton (Liberia, Cañas Dulces, Mayorga, Nacascolo, and Curubandé districts), Bagaces canton (Bagaces district), Cañas canton (Cañas and San Miguel districts), Abangares canton (Las Juntas district), and La Cruz canton (La Cruz and Santa Elena districts).

In Puntarenas province the route covers Puntarenas canton (Pitahaya, Chomes, Barranca, and Acapulco districts), Esparza canton (Espíritu Santo and Macacona districts), and Montes de Oro canton (Miramar and San Isidro districts).

=== Route and access ===
Lane availability per direction is very irregular, with plans to widen to up to four lanes between San José and Alajuela, two lanes between Alajuela and San Ramón, then one lane until Barranca (there are no plans to widen to two lanes), where two lanes until Liberia are in construction. The road will retain one lane until the Peñas Blancas frontier with Nicaragua.

It provides access to the main airport of the country, the Juan Santamaría International Airport.

=== Toll booths ===
There are toll booths in Río Segundo, Alajuela and El Rosario, Naranjo.

== History ==
=== Bernardo Soto Highway ===
Inaugurated on 8 December 1972 in the government of José Figueres Ferrer in his second term (1970-1974), this segment shortened the duration of the trip from two hours to one, and the distance between San José and San Ramón by 16 kilometers, during its construction it was known as the Coco-San Ramón section, Coco corresponds to the town where the Juan Santamaría International Airport is currently located, which also had the name of El Coco International Airport in the past.

The project was conceived during the government of Francisco José Orlich Bolmarcich (1966-1970).

=== Alfredo González Bridge defects and widening ===
The Alfredo González Bridge is an originally two lane per direction bridge over Virilla river, which became infamous for a detrimental infrastructure gaffe. In 2008 a metal plate expansion joint cover, (known as a platina in Spanish) between two segments of the bridge detached on the San José to Alajuela direction lane of the bridge. As it took nine years to repair the issue, the bridge, which was unnamed before, was known with dismay as the puente de la platina, translated as "the metal plate bridge".

The first immediate repair attempt involved just using solder, which quickly detached again. In 2010 the Soares da Costa company was contracted to repair the issue, which also failed as the pour-over concrete applied, was pulverized by the vehicles. The Engineers and Architects Professional Association (CFIA) and the National Laboratory of Materials and Structural Models (LANAMME) advised against this solution since its proposal.

It wasn't until 2016 that a proper solution was put in motion, by awarding a contract to the CODOCSA company to widen the bridge from two lanes to three in each direction, which by definition involved the reconstruction of the affected joint cover.

The now named bridge was reopened in May 2017, however being a three lane bridge it was deemed as already obsolete, as there is a plan to widen Route 1 to four lanes by direction between Uruca, San José and the Juan Santamaría Airport, therefore this bridge will become a bottleneck.

=== La Guaria creek culvert sinking ===
On June 26, 2012, a culvert on the La Guaria creek, near Heredia, was destroyed due to heavy rains, also it was found out that instead of proper filling on the foundations of the road when constructed in the 1960s, there were tree trunks and other organic materials that over time compacted.

By 2008, a concerned neighbor presented to the authorities a proper study where it was highlighted that the situation was a certain outcome due to the urbanization of the neighboring rural areas. No actions were taken by the government authorities.

A new rectangular culvert was built by the contracted company MECO, during construction a couple of Bailey bridges with a capacity of 40 tons were put in place, which also were destroyed by an 84-ton truck crane on November 6, 2012.

=== San José to San Ramón enhancements ===
A heavy transited component of Route 1 is the segment between San José and San Ramón, from the junction with Route 39 until Juan Santamaría International Airport, the road will be widen to four lanes per direction, then from the airport to San Ramón (canton) which as of 2019 is a one lane per direction design, with several short upward segments with two lanes, will be widen to two lanes per direction.

A private foreign contractor, OAS, was awarded the project, which under the private concession model would enhance and operate the road, as in Route 27, however due to the projected expensive toll fares, the affected residential and industrial neighbors of the route, formed the Foro de Occidente (West Forum), to oppose the construction, which ultimately halted the project in April 2013, and the government had to revoke the contract with a cost of US$35 million and no work done.

Fideicomiso Ruta Uno (Route One Escrow), FRU, was created by Banco de Costa Rica to manage the finances of the works on Route 1. In July 2019, FRU was awarded the control of the toll stations of Río Segundo and Naranjo, which provide the main income of the project. It is estimated that the toll will increase in price at Río Segundo from CRC ₡75 to CRC ₡200, and at Naranjo from CRC ₡150 to CRC ₡400. The toll booths will include automated electronic toll collection.

==== OBIS projects ====
The Obras Impostergables, or OBIS, which translates to "works that can't be delayed", were announced by the central government in June 2018, and are seventeen auxiliary projects that were created around this road segment of Route 1, that can begin construction while the remaining analysis, design and expropriation phases advance on the main road project. These include new roads to link Route 1 with other areas, new junctions as well as new lanes on bridges that are a bottleneck to the road.

Work was divided in four main batches, numbered one through four, then further divided into 1, 2a, 2b, 3 and 4. In September 2019, Fideicomiso Ruta Uno received bids for batch 1, their designs were ready by late April 2020, with a projected start date on mid May 2020.

===== Archaeological findings =====
In August 2020 while doing excavation works for the Castella Conservatory interchange, a stone paved road from the pre-Hispanic era was found, works were rearranged to prioritize surrounding areas that would not impact the archaeological studies by the National Museum.

OBIS #	Batch (Old)	Name	Start Date	End Date	Description	Coordinates
1	2a (2)	Torres River bridge.			Widening to four lanes in each direction.	9.9440°N 84.1057°W
2	2a (3)	Loop road (Route 39) interchange.			Widening from four to six lanes in both levels, adding a side road on each exit	9.946051°N 84.108804°W
3	4 (4)	Juan Pablo II bridge.			Either reinforcement of the current structure, or demolition and total reconstruction	9.950129°N 84.111731°W
4	1 (3)	Castella Conservatory interchange.	28 May 2020	Before 28 May 2021	New interchange and arterial road between Route 1 and Route 106 in Barreal, Heredia.	9.968608°N 84.136880°W
5	2b (3)	Existing toll booths upgrades.			A new lane at the Río Segundo, Alajuela toll booth	10.000973°N 84.185737°W
5	2b (3)	Existing toll booths upgrades.			New infrastructure at Naranjo toll booth	10.054625°N 84.361238°W
6	1 (2)	Firestone interchange.	May 2020		Widening to eight lanes.	9.995761°N 84.167864°W
7	1 (2)	Segundo River bridge.	May 2020		Widening to eight lanes total, four in each direction.	10.002360°N 84.176926°W
8	4 (4)	Segundo River junction.				10.000082°N 84.191972°W
9	4 (4)	Road segment between Virilla River and Segundo River.				9.978380°N 84.199143°W
10	1 (1)	Ciruelas River bridge.	5 August 2020 (Was scheduled for May 2020)	Before 5 August 2021	Widening to six lanes total, three in each direction.	9.998660°N 84.215694°W
11	3 (4)	Coyol junction.				9.996625°N 84.268935°W
12	1 (1)	Alajuela River bridge.	19 August 2020	April 2021	Widening to six lanes total, three in each direction.	10.002188°N 84.310649°W
13	3 (4)	FANAL junction.				10.015734°N 84.342681°W
14	4 (4)	Grecia junction.				10.019130°N 84.356652°W
15	4 (4)	Naranjo junction.				10.065661°N 84.362818°W
16	3 (4)	Grande River junction.				10.080960°N 84.382991°W
17	4 (4)	San Ramón junction.				10.076499°N 84.470185°W

Sketch map of the 17 OBIS projects on the Route 1 of Costa Rica, between San José and San Ramón

=== Barranca to Liberia enhancements ===
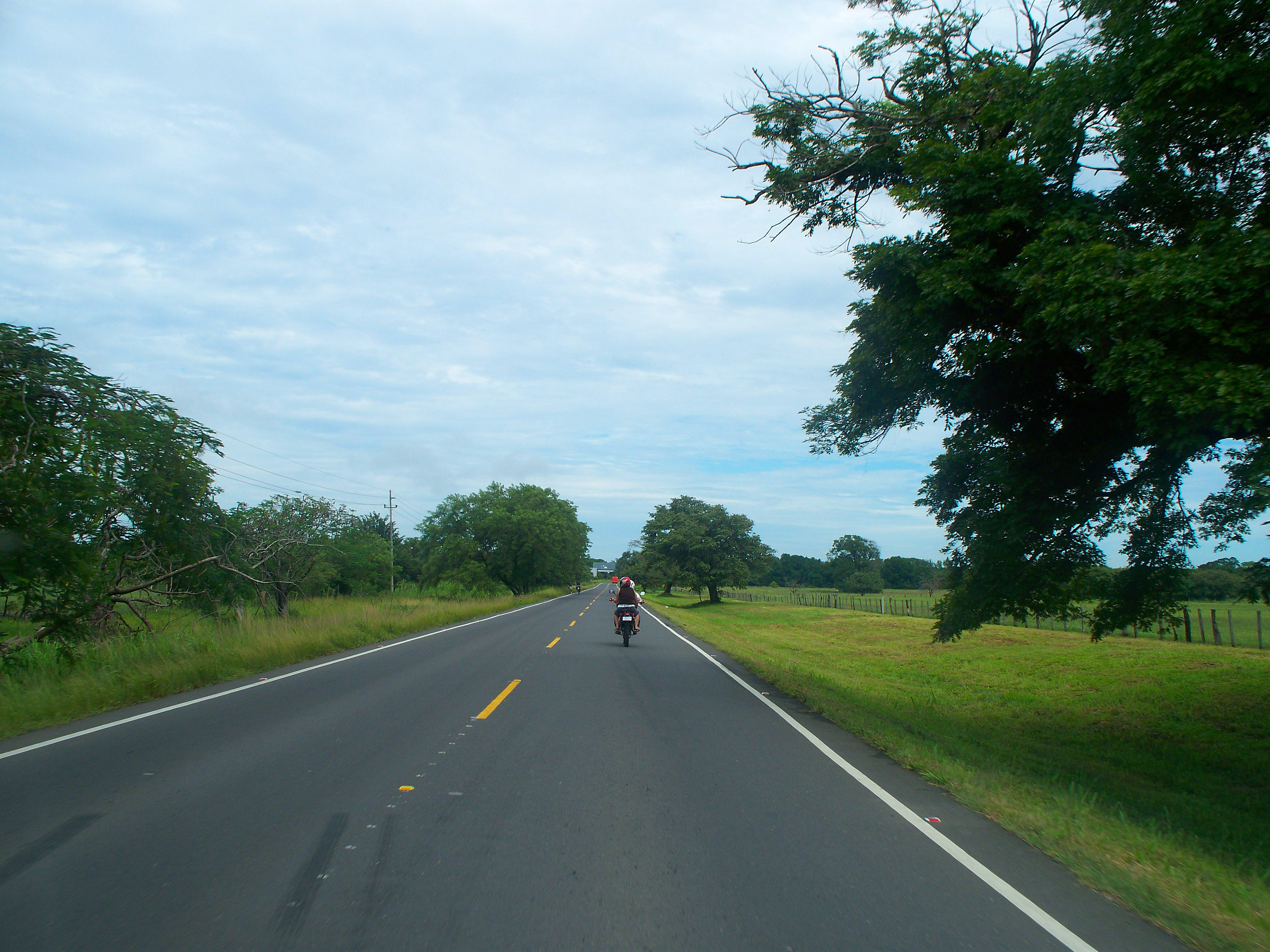
Highway 1 in Guanacaste, near Liberia

This project was split into three subprojects, to widen the road from one lane per direction to two lanes per direction, four lanes in total. Initially the plan from 2008 was to widen the segment from Peñas Blancas to Barranca, but by 2015 the segment from Liberia to Peñas Blancas was deemed unnecessary.

==== Cañas to Liberia widening ====
Meetings started in 2012 and works concluded in January 2016, for this 50 km segment of Route 1, it also adds adding a 12 km bicycle lane and proper sidewalks. Eleven pedestrian bridges, nine underground and seven tree canopy wildlife crossings were also constructed.

Three two level junctions were constructed in Cañas, Bagaces and Liberia. There is a possibility to add toll booths to the segment.

==== Limonal to Cañas ====
Continuing from Limonal north to Cañas, this 21 km segment started construction in September 2018, however expropriation processes delayed much of the work, which was planned to finish in 2020, pushing the delivery date to 2021. Will include seven bridges, eight pedestrian bridges and eighteen wildlife crossings.

==== Barranca to Limonal ====
From Limonal south to Barranca, this 50 kilometer final segment of the widening project will connect with Route 1 and through Route 23 to Route 27. Works are planned to start in the first half of 2020. On 11 March 2020, the project was awarded to Consorcio Ruta 1 (Hernán Solís SRL e Ingeniería Estrella S.A.), and while the other segments were constructed with concrete, this section will be made with asphalt. Works were authorized to start on 28 August 2020.
