= Río Segundo =

Río Segundo may refer to:

- Segundo River, a river in Córdoba Province, Argentina.
- Río Segundo, Córdoba, a city in Córdoba Province, Argentina.
- Río Segundo Department, an administrative division of Córdoba Province, Argentina.
- Río Segundo District, an administrative division of Alajuela (canton), Alajuela Province, Costa Rica.
