= Belén (canton) =

Canton in Heredia province, Costa Rica

- Canton
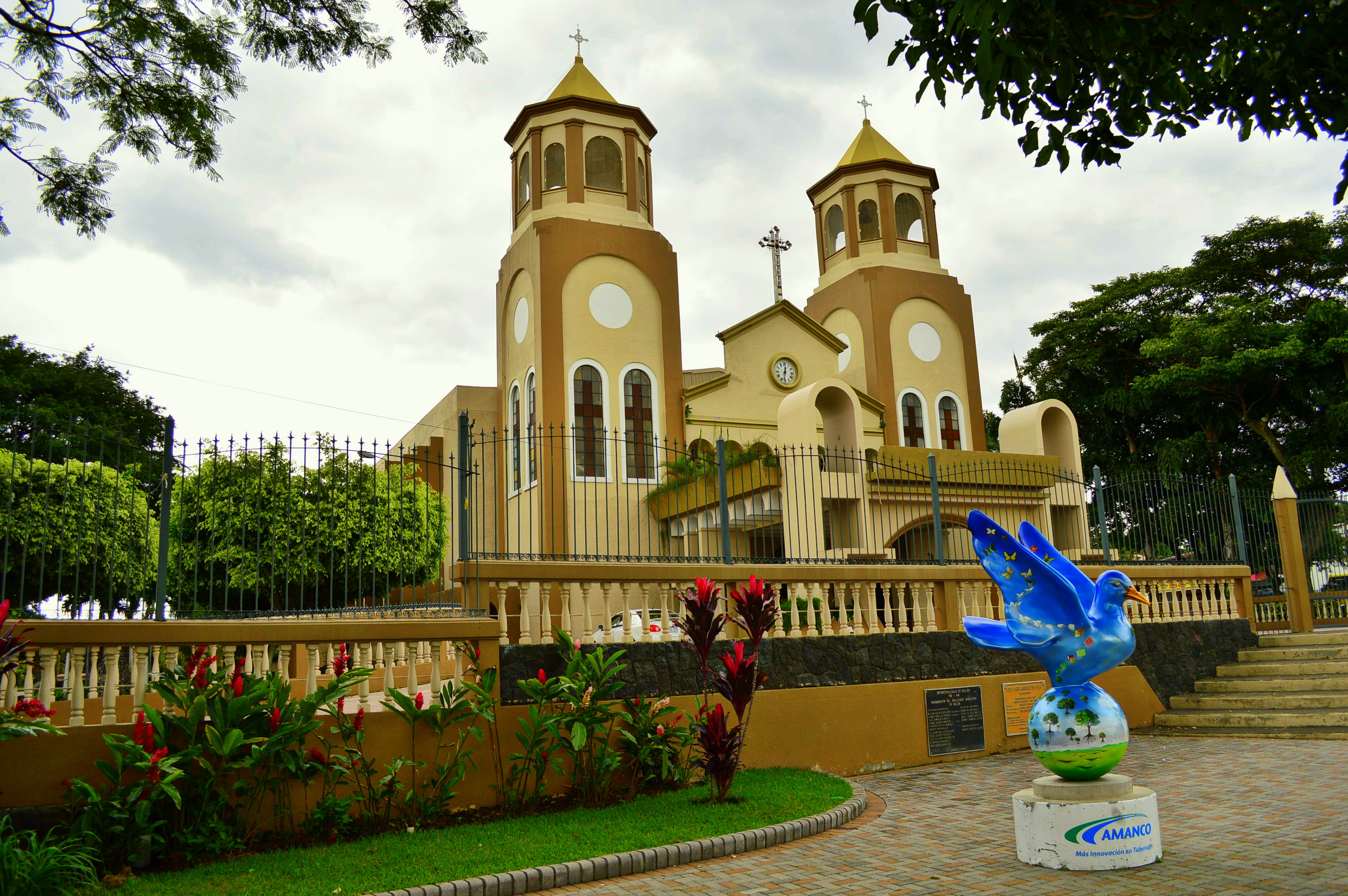
- San Antonio Church, Belén

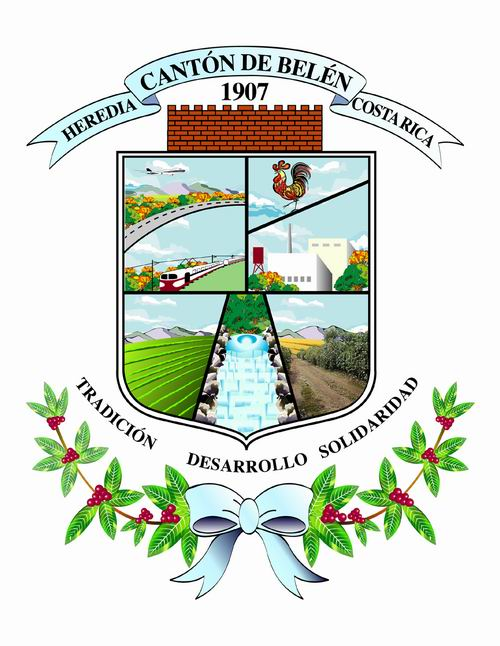
- Flag Seal
- Interactive map of Belén
- Belén canton location in Costa Rica
- Coordinates: 9.9854406°N 84.1768586°W
- Country: Costa Rica
- Province: Heredia
- Creation: 8 June 1907
- Head city: San Antonio
- Districts: Districts: San Antonio; La Ribera; La Asunción

Government
  - Type: Municipality
  - Body: Municipalidad de Belén
  - Mayor: Zeneida Chaves Fernández (PUSC)

Area
  - Total: 12.15 km^{2} (4.69 sq mi)
- Elevation: 937 m (3,074 ft)

Population (2011)
  - Total: 21,633
  - Density: 1,780/km^{2} (4,611/sq mi)
- Demonym: Belemita
- Time zone: UTC−06:00
- Canton code: 407
- Website: belen.go.cr

Belén is the seventh canton in the Heredia province of Costa Rica. The head city is in San Antonio district. It is part of the Greater Metropolitan Area, where the housing area constitutes at least 25% of the canton's surface.

It limits to the north and west with the canton of Alajuela, to the east with Flores and Heredia, and to the south with San José, Escazú and Santa Ana. It was founded on June 8, 1907. Its headquarters is the city of San Antonio.

The economy of the canton of Belén is based on industry, commerce and services. The new industries installed are technologies, hotels, manufacturing, commerce, among others. To the north of the region is the developing industrial zone La Ribera and La Asunción, which constitutes 18% of the area of the canton. In 2011, the presence of Intel's high-tech industrial plant made Belén the canton with the highest competitiveness index in the country. As of 2020, the canton has the third highest Human Development Index of any region in Costa Rica with a HDI of 0.858.

The main recreation center is the Balneario Ojo de Agua, the skate park and the sports center. Important historical sites are the House of Culture (Built in 1908), and the old Pacific Railway station, as well as the Church dedicated to San Antonio de Padua.

== History ==
Belén was created on 8 June 1907 by decree 15, located to the west of the central canton of Heredia. Until 1791, this canton was inhabited by Huetar indigenous people and later by Spaniards. By the early 19th century, there was already a small chapel dedicated to the Virgin of the Assumption. The first chapel was built in 1856, and in 1967 the parish was established in honor of Saint Anthony.

In 1800, primary education began, and in 1919, a school named Benedicto XV was inaugurated, but it only lasted five years. In 1929, a new school was completed, named Spain in honor of a Spaniard who managed its construction.

The development of what was first the canton began in 1843 with the export of coffee to European markets. By constructing an access road between the port of Puntarenas and San José, this place became a mandatory rest stop. Initially, when it was just a small town, the canton was called Potrerillo, then Barrio de La Asunción, and later San Antonio. The name Belén was given by Monsignor Joaquín Llorente y La Fuente, who coincidentally visited the place twice in consecutive years (1858 and 1859) and celebrated the Christmas Eve midnight mass there. He indicated that he would continue calling the place "San Antonio de Belén" because Bethlehem (Belén) is the birthplace of Jesus.

The canton of Belén is entirely part of the Greater Metropolitan Area and has become a hub for residential, commercial, and industrial development, leveraging its proximity and good connections to other development hubs like the Juan Santamaría International Airport. San Antonio is now connected by bus to the cities of Heredia, San José, Alajuela, San Joaquín, Santa Ana, and currently has urban train service that also connects the canton with the city of San José. Many companies operating in Free Trade Zones have established themselves in the eastern part of the canton; Intel, despite having moved part of its operations outside of Costa Rica, still maintains some production in the canton. In Belén, there are also companies like Firestone, Amanco, Pipasa, EPA, Kimberly-Clark, Pedregal, Tribu, Belca, Lizano, Unilever, and Trimpot, among others.

In the commercial sector, Belén hosts the La Ribera Shopping Center, has a well-developed hotel industry with major international chains such as the Marriott Hotel, the Ramada Herradura Hotel, the Double Tree by Hilton Cariari Hotel, and the Cariari Country Club is also located in Belén. Recently, a Hard Rock Café, the first of its kind in Costa Rica, was opened in the La Asunción district.

The Ojo de Agua recreational center is located in the La Ribera district, with the boundary between the cantons of Belén and Alajuela passing over Ojo de Agua. However, the spring, pools, and most of the center are on the Belén side, so the Municipality of Belén is responsible for providing services. The Club Campestre Español is another recreational center located in the La Ribera district.

Belén is home to the central headquarters of the Mormons, with their temple located in the La Ribera district, while in the La Asunción district there is a grotto in honor of the Virgin of Lourdes next to a Franciscan convent.

The canton borders the central canton of Heredia to the east, the canton of Flores to the northeast, the cantons of Santa Ana, Escazú, and San José (all three belonging to the province of San José) to the south, and the district of San Rafael de Alajuela to the west. The Virilla, Segundo, Bermúdez, and Quebrada Seca rivers flow through the canton; the first two also mark the cantonal and provincial boundary with the provinces of San José and Alajuela, respectively.

== Geography ==
Belén has an area of 12.15 km^{2} (4.69 sq mi) and a mean elevation of 937 metres.

The area is well known locally for its inland chalk cliffs.

== Districts ==
The canton of Belén is subdivided into the following districts:

Districts of the Belén Canton
#	District	Area (km^{2})	Elevation	Population (2011)
1	San Antonio	3.56	912 m	10,884
2	La Ribera	4.26	953 m	6,724
3	La Asunción	4.57	945 m	6,584

== Demographics ==
Historical population
Census	Pop.	±% p.a.
1927	2,782	—
1950	3,226	+0.65%
1963	4,781	+3.07%
1973	8,538	+5.97%
1984	11,993	+3.14%
2000	19,834	+3.19%
2011	21,633	+0.79%
2022	23,759	+0.86%
Source: Instituto Nacional de Estadística y Censos; Centro Centroamericano de Población

For the year 2022, the canton of Belén has an estimated population of 26,853 inhabitants. According to the last census conducted in 2011, the canton of Belén had a population of 21,633 inhabitants.

According to the 2011 National Census, the population of the canton was 21,633 inhabitants, of which 12.0% were born abroad. The same census highlights that there were 6,011 occupied homes, of which 82.5% were in good condition, and 2.9% of the homes had overcrowding issues. All of its inhabitants lived in urban areas.

Among other data, the literacy rate in the canton is 99.0%, with an average schooling of 10.3 years.

The same census details that the economically active population is distributed as follows:

- Primary Sector: 2.8%
- Secondary Sector: 26.0%
- Tertiary Sector: 71.2%

== Transportation ==
The compact canton is on the western side of the General Cañas Highway midway between the national capital city of San José and the Juan Santamaría International Airport.

=== Road transportation ===
The canton is covered by the following road routes:

- National Route 1
- National Route 3
- National Route 111
- National Route 122
- National Route 129

=== Rail transportation ===
The Interurbano Line operated by Incofer goes through this canton.

== Education ==
The American International School of Costa Rica is located in Cariari, La Asunción District, Belén.
