= National Route 171 (Costa Rica) =

National Road Route in Costa Rica

National Secondary Route 171
- Ruta nacional secundaria 171

Route information
- Maintained by Ministry of Public Works and Transport
- Length: 3.890 km (2.417 mi)

Location
- Country: Costa Rica
- Provinces: Heredia

Highway system
- National Road Network of Costa Rica
← Route 170	→ Route 174

National Secondary Route 171, or just Route 171 (Spanish: Ruta Nacional Secundaria 171, or Ruta 171) is a National Road Route of Costa Rica located in the Heredia province.

== Description ==
This road starts next to the San Vicente de Paul Hospital in Heredia, and ends in the junction with Route 106 in Ulloa.

In Heredia province the route covers Heredia canton (Heredia, San Francisco, and Ulloa districts).
