= Sabanilla District, Alajuela =

Sabanilla
- District
- Sabanilla district
- Sabanilla district location in Costa Rica
- Coordinates: 10.1173881°N 84.2086348°W
- Country: Costa Rica
- Province: Alajuela
- Canton: Alajuela

Area
  - Total: 43.05 km^{2} (16.62 sq mi)
- Elevation: 1,270 m (4,170 ft)

Population (2011)
  - Total: 9,059
  - Density: 210.4/km^{2} (545.0/sq mi)
- Time zone: UTC−06:00
- Postal code: 20107

Sabanilla is a district of the Alajuela canton, in the Alajuela province of Costa Rica.

Sabanilla town lies about 12 km by road north of the centre of Alajuela. It covers an area of 43.32 km^{2} and as of 2011 had a population of 9,059 people. A major coffee producing area, in which is located Doka Estate, a supplier of Starbucks. Another important activity is motocross, since they have one of the most important motocross tracks in the country, La Olla del Poás, better known as La Fergara in its locality, El Cerro.

== Geography ==
Sabanilla has an area of 43.05 km^{2} and an elevation of 1,270 metres.

== Demographics ==
Historical population
Census	Pop.	±% p.a.
1883	918	—
1892	1,456	+5.26%
1927	1,461	+0.01%
1950	2,995	+3.17%
1963	4,155	+2.55%
1973	4,765	+1.38%
1984	4,899	+0.25%
2000	8,335	+3.38%
2011	9,059	+0.76%
2022	11,333	+2.06%
Source: Instituto Nacional de Estadística y Censos; Centro Centroamericano de Población

For the 2011 census, Sabanilla had a population of 9,059 inhabitants.

== Transportation ==
=== Road transportation ===
The district is covered by the following road routes:

- National Route 107
- National Route 120
- National Route 130
- National Route 146
- National Route 712

== Settlements ==
1. Sabanilla (The district center)
2. Fraijanes
3. Poasito
4. San Luis
5. El Cerro
6. Los Ángeles
7. Lajas
8. La Doka
9. Bajo Santa Bárbara
10. Alto del Desengaño
11. Vargas (Part of it)
12. El Espino (Part of it)
