= National Route 106 (Costa Rica) =

National Road Route in Costa Rica

National Secondary Route 106
- Ruta nacional secundaria 106

Route information
- Maintained by Ministry of Public Works and Transport
- Length: 5.810 km (3.610 mi)

Major junctions
- East end: Route 3
- Route 1 (Castella Conservatory); Route 1 (Real Cariari); Calle Pules, Bajo las Cabras
- West end: Route 111

Location
- Country: Costa Rica
- Provinces: Heredia

Highway system
- National Road Network of Costa Rica
← Route 105	→ Route 107

National Secondary Route 106, or just Route 106 (Spanish: Ruta Nacional Secundaria 106, or Ruta 106) is a National Road Route of Costa Rica, located in the Heredia province. Is a parallel road north to a segment of Route 1.

== Description ==
In Heredia province the route covers Heredia canton (Ulloa district).

This road starts in the junction with Route 3 at La Valencia in Heredia, and ends in the Junction with Route 1 and Route 111 near Real Cariari mall.

== History ==
A bridge over La Guaria creek in 2008 was partially destroyed, in one of the lanes a Bailey bridge was installed. In September 2019 the works to install a new prefabricated bridge were started.

The same creek also damaged a culvert on Route 1 in 2012.
