= La Asunción District =

District in Belén canton, Heredia province, Costa Rica

La Asunción
- District
- Interactive map of La Asunción
- La Asunción district location in Costa Rica
- Coordinates: 9.9788534°N 84.1652601°W
- Country: Costa Rica
- Province: Heredia
- Canton: Belén

Area
  - Total: 4.62 km^{2} (1.78 sq mi)
- Elevation: 945 m (3,100 ft)

Population (2011)
  - Total: 5,651
  - Density: 1,220/km^{2} (3,170/sq mi)
- Time zone: UTC−06:00
- Postal code: 40703

La Asunción is a district of the Belén canton, in the Heredia province of Costa Rica.

== Geography ==
La Asunción has an area of 4.62 km² and an elevation of 945 metres.

== Locations ==
- Barrios: Arbolito, Bonanza, Bosques de Doña Rosa, Cariari (part), Chompipes (part), Cristo Rey (part)

== Demographics ==
Historical population
Census	Pop.	±% p.a.
1927	511	—
1950	608	+0.76%
1963	937	+3.38%
1984	2,243	+4.24%
2000	3,891	+3.50%
2011	5,651	+3.45%
2022	4,281	−2.49%
Source: Instituto Nacional de Estadística y Censos; Centro Centroamericano de Población

For the 2011 census, La Asunción had a population of 5,651 inhabitants.

== Transportation ==
=== Road transportation ===
The district is covered by the following road routes:

- National Route 1
- National Route 111

=== Rail transportation ===
The Interurbano Line operated by Incofer goes through this district.
