= Desamparados District, Alajuela =

District in Alajuela province, Costa Rica

Desamparados
- District
- Interactive map of Desamparados
- Desamparados district location in Costa Rica
- Coordinates: 10.0315027°N 84.1876777°W
- Country: Costa Rica
- Province: Alajuela
- Canton: Alajuela

Area
  - Total: 12.95 km^{2} (5.00 sq mi)
- Elevation: 1,010 m (3,310 ft)

Population (2011)
  - Total: 26,109
  - Density: 2,016/km^{2} (5,222/sq mi)
- Time zone: UTC−06:00
- Postal code: 20110

Desamparados is a district of the Alajuela canton, in the Alajuela province of Costa Rica.

== Geography ==
Desamparados has an area of 12.95 km^{2} and an elevation of 1,010 metres.

== Demographics ==
Historical population
Census	Pop.	±% p.a.
1864	574	—
1883	648	+0.64%
1892	891	+3.60%
1927	1,047	+0.46%
1950	1,348	+1.10%
1963	2,440	+4.67%
1973	6,670	+10.58%
1984	8,268	+1.97%
2000	21,075	+6.02%
2011	26,109	+1.97%
2022	29,782	+1.20%
Source: Instituto Nacional de Estadística y Censos; Centro Centroamericano de Población

For the 2011 census, Desamparados had a population of 26,109 inhabitants.

== Transportation ==
=== Road transportation ===
The district is covered by the following road routes:

- National Route 3
- National Route 123

=== Rail transportation ===
The Interurbano Line operated by Incofer goes through this district.
