= Ulloa District =

District in Heredia canton, Heredia province, Costa Rica

Ulloa
- District
- Ulloa district
- Ulloa district location in Costa Rica
- Coordinates: 9.9751375°N 84.1359263°W
- Country: Costa Rica
- Province: Heredia
- Canton: Heredia

Area
  - Total: 11.47 km^{2} (4.43 sq mi)
- Elevation: 1,003 m (3,291 ft)

Population (2011)
  - Total: 29,266
  - Density: 2,552/km^{2} (6,608/sq mi)
- Time zone: UTC−06:00
- Postal code: 40104

Ulloa (Spanish pronunciation: [uˈʝo.a]) is a district of the Heredia canton in the Heredia province of Costa Rica.

== Geography ==
Ulloa has an area of 11.47 km^{2} and an elevation of 1,003 metres.

== Demographics ==
Historical population
Census	Pop.	±% p.a.
1892	703	—
1927	1,041	+1.13%
1950	1,435	+1.41%
1963	2,432	+4.14%
1973	4,275	+5.80%
1984	7,398	+5.11%
2000	22,456	+7.19%
2011	29,266	+2.44%
2022	36,027	+1.91%
Source: Instituto Nacional de Estadística y Censos; Centro Centroamericano de Población

For the 2011 census, Ulloa had a population of 29,266 inhabitants.

== Transportation ==
=== Road transportation ===
The district is covered by the following road routes:

- National Route 1
- National Route 3
- National Route 103
- National Route 106
- National Route 111
- National Route 171
