= La Ribera District =

District in Belén canton, Heredia province, Costa Rica

La Ribera
- District
- Interactive map of La Ribera
- La Ribera district location in Costa Rica
- Coordinates: 9.9938512°N 84.1819931°W
- Country: Costa Rica
- Province: Heredia
- Canton: Belén

Area
  - Total: 4.28 km^{2} (1.65 sq mi)
- Elevation: 953 m (3,127 ft)

Population (2011)
  - Total: 6,040
  - Density: 1,410/km^{2} (3,660/sq mi)
- Time zone: UTC−06:00
- Postal code: 40702

La Ribera, also spelled La Rivera, just Ribera or Rivera, is a district of the Belén canton, in the Heredia province of Costa Rica.

== Geography ==
La Ribera has an area of 4.28 km^{2} and an elevation of 953 metres.

== Locations ==
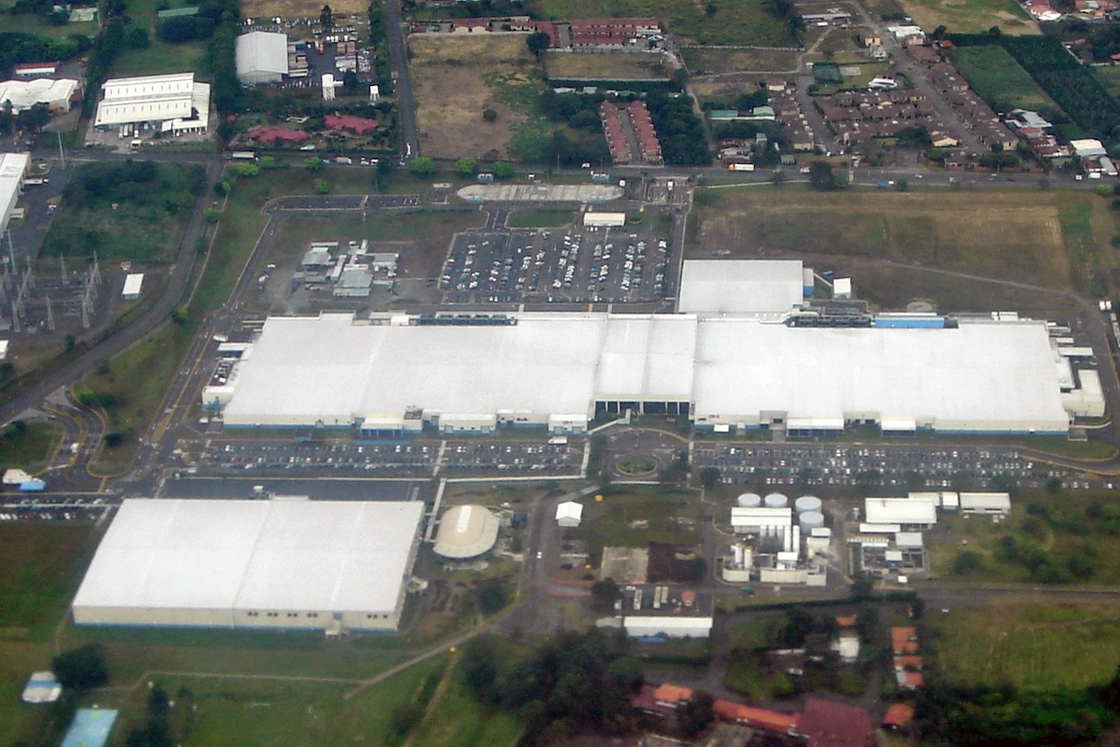
Intel Costa Rica

- Barrios: Fuente, Labores (partial), Vista Linda, Cristo Rey (partial).
- Poblado: Echeverría (partial).
- Intel, once a semiconductor foundry, these offices now focus on services.

== Demographics ==
Historical population
Census	Pop.	±% p.a.
1892	622	—
1927	717	+0.41%
1950	940	+1.18%
1963	1,415	+3.20%
1973	2,592	+6.24%
1984	3,855	+3.67%
2000	5,687	+2.46%
2011	6,040	+0.55%
2022	7,694	+2.22%
Source: Instituto Nacional de Estadística y Censos; Centro Centroamericano de Población

For the 2011 census, La Ribera had a population of 6,040 inhabitants.

== Transportation ==
=== Road transportation ===
The district is covered by the following road routes:

- National Route 1
- National Route 3
- National Route 111
- National Route 129

=== Rail transportation ===
The Interurbano Line operated by Incofer goes through this district.
