= Garita District, Alajuela =

District in Alajuela canton, Alajuela province, Costa Rica

Garita
- District
- Interactive map of Garita
- Garita district location in Costa Rica
- Coordinates: 9.9897201°N 84.3061084°W
- Country: Costa Rica
- Province: Alajuela
- Canton: Alajuela
- Creation: 6 November 1922

Area
  - Total: 33.91 km^{2} (13.09 sq mi)
- Elevation: 693 m (2,274 ft)

Population (2011)
  - Total: 7,277
  - Density: 214.6/km^{2} (555.8/sq mi)
- Time zone: UTC−06:00
- Postal code: 20113

Garita is a district of the Alajuela canton, in the Alajuela province of Costa Rica.

== History ==
Garita was created on 6 November 1922 by Decreto 28.

== Geography ==
Garita has an area of 33.91 km^{2} and an elevation of 693 metres.

== Demographics ==
Historical population
Census	Pop.	±% p.a.
1883	367	—
1892	503	+3.56%
1927	911	+1.71%
1950	1,434	+1.99%
1963	2,109	+3.01%
1973	3,138	+4.05%
1984	4,114	+2.49%
2000	6,856	+3.24%
2011	7,277	+0.54%
2022	9,296	+2.25%
Source: Instituto Nacional de Estadística y Censos; Centro Centroamericano de Población

For the 2011 census, Garita had a population of 7,277 inhabitants.

== Transportation ==
=== Road transportation ===
The district is covered by the following road routes:

- National Route 1
- National Route 3
- National Route 136
- National Route 721
