= National Route 122 (Costa Rica) =

National Road Route in Costa Rica

National Secondary Route 122
- Ruta nacional secundaria 122

Route information
- Maintained by Ministry of Public Works and Transport
- Length: 8.495 km (5.279 mi)

Location
- Country: Costa Rica
- Provinces: Alajuela, Heredia

Highway system
- National Road Network of Costa Rica
← Route 121	→ Route 123

National Secondary Route 122, or just Route 122 (Spanish: Ruta Nacional Secundaria 122, or Ruta 122) is a National Road Route of Costa Rica located in the Alajuela and Heredia provinces.

== Description ==
In Alajuela province the route covers Alajuela canton (San Antonio, Guácima, and San Rafael districts).

In Heredia province the route covers Belén canton (San Antonio district).
