= Varablanca =

District in Heredia canton, Heredia province, Costa Rica

- District
- Varablanca district
- Varablanca district location in Costa Rica
- Coordinates: 10.177387°N 84.0403278°W
- Country: Costa Rica
- Province: Heredia
- Canton: Heredia
- Creation: 5 July 1971

Area
  - Total: 258.05 km^{2} (99.63 sq mi)
- Elevation: 1,804 m (5,919 ft)

Population (2011)
  - Total: 700
  - Density: 2.7/km^{2} (7.0/sq mi)
- Time zone: UTC−06:00
- Postal code: 40105

Varablanca is a district of the Heredia canton in the Heredia province of Costa Rica.

The Varablanca head city is located between Poas Volcano and Barva Volcano in the Heredia Province of Costa Rica. It is an important cross-road location for all major traffic connecting the northern parts of Costa Rica, especially the Sarapiqui River delta area with the major population area of the San Jose Central Valley. On January 8, 2009, it was struck by a powerful 6.1 magnitude earthquake known as the Cinchona earthquake.

== History ==
Varablanca was created on 5 July 1971 by Decreto 1819-G. It was segregated from districts Puerto Viejo and Dulce Nombre de Jesús.

== Geography ==
Varablanca has an area of 258.05 km^{2} and an elevation of 1,804 metres.

== Demographics ==
Historical population
Census	Pop.	±% p.a.
1973	525	—
1984	569	+0.73%
2000	690	+1.21%
2011	700	+0.13%
2022	772	+0.89%
Source: Instituto Nacional de Estadística y Censos; Centro Centroamericano de Población

For the 2011 census, Varablanca had a population of 700 inhabitants.

== Transportation ==
=== Road transportation ===
The district is covered by the following road routes:

- National Route 120
- National Route 126
