= National Route 124 (Costa Rica) =

National Road Route in Costa Rica

National Secondary Route 124
- Ruta nacional secundaria 124

Route information
- Maintained by Ministry of Public Works and Transport
- Length: 13.425 km (8.342 mi)

Location
- Country: Costa Rica
- Provinces: Alajuela

Highway system
- National Road Network of Costa Rica
← Route 123	→ Route 125

National Secondary Route 124, or just Route 124 (Spanish: Ruta Nacional Secundaria 124, or Ruta 124) is a National Road Route of Costa Rica located in the Alajuela province.

== Description ==
In Alajuela province the route covers Alajuela canton (Alajuela, San Antonio, Guácima, and San Rafael districts).
