= Tambor District =

District in Alajuela canton, Alajuela province, Costa Rica

Tambor
- District
- Tambor district
- Tambor district location in Costa Rica
- Coordinates: 10.0283414°N 84.2673075°W
- Country: Costa Rica
- Province: Alajuela
- Canton: Alajuela
- Creation: 6 November 1922

Area
  - Total: 13.88 km^{2} (5.36 sq mi)
- Elevation: 950 m (3,120 ft)

Population (2011)
  - Total: 10,992
  - Density: 791.9/km^{2} (2,051/sq mi)
- Time zone: UTC−06:00
- Postal code: 20112

Tambor is a district of the Alajuela canton, in the Alajuela province of Costa Rica.

== History ==
Tambor was created on 6 November 1922 by Decreto 28.

== Geography ==
Tambor has an area of 13.88 km^{2} and an elevation of 950 metres.

== Demographics ==
Historical population
Census	Pop.	±% p.a.
1927	1,249	—
1950	1,585	+1.04%
1963	2,080	+2.11%
1973	3,163	+4.28%
1984	5,148	+4.53%
2000	9,370	+3.81%
2011	10,992	+1.46%
2022	15,847	+3.38%
Source: Instituto Nacional de Estadística y Censos; Centro Centroamericano de Población

For the 2011 census, Tambor had a population of 10,992 inhabitants.

== Transportation ==
=== Road transportation ===
The district is covered by the following road routes:

- National Route 107
- National Route 118
- National Route 718
- National Route 719
- National Route 727
