= National Route 720 (Costa Rica) =

National Road Route in Costa Rica

National Tertiary Route 720
- Ruta nacional terciaria 720

Route information
- Maintained by Ministry of Public Works and Transport
- Length: 5.960 km (3.703 mi)

Location
- Country: Costa Rica
- Provinces: Alajuela

Highway system
- National Road Network of Costa Rica
| ← Route 719 | → Route 721 |

National Tertiary Route 720, or just Route 720 (Spanish: Ruta Nacional Terciaria 720, or Ruta 720) is a National Road Route of Costa Rica located in the Alajuela province.

== Description ==
In Alajuela province the route covers Atenas canton (Concepción district).
