= National Route 123 (Costa Rica) =

National Road Route in Costa Rica

National Secondary Route 123
- Ruta nacional secundaria 123

Route information
- Maintained by Ministry of Public Works and Transport
- Length: 11.475 km (7.130 mi)

Location
- Country: Costa Rica
- Provinces: Alajuela, Heredia

Highway system
- National Road Network of Costa Rica
← Route 122	→ Route 124

National Secondary Route 123, or just Route 123 (Spanish: Ruta Nacional Secundaria 123, or Ruta 123) is a National Road Route of Costa Rica located in the Alajuela and Heredia provinces.

== Description ==
In Alajuela province the route covers Alajuela canton (Alajuela and Desamparados districts).

In Heredia province the route covers Santa Bárbara canton (Santa Bárbara, San Pedro, and San Juan districts) and Flores canton (San Joaquín, Barrantes, and Llorente districts).
