= National Route 130 (Costa Rica) =

National Road Route in Costa Rica

National Secondary Route 130
- Ruta nacional secundaria 130

Route information
- Maintained by Ministry of Public Works and Transport
- Length: 17.285 km (10.740 mi)

Location
- Country: Costa Rica
- Provinces: Alajuela

Highway system
- National Road Network of Costa Rica
← Route 129	→ Route 131

National Secondary Route 130, or just Route 130 (Spanish: Ruta Nacional Secundaria 130, or Ruta 130) is a National Road Route of Costa Rica located in the Alajuela province.

== Description ==
In Alajuela province the route covers Alajuela canton (Alajuela, San Isidro, and Sabanilla districts) and Poás canton (San Pedro district).
