= Mercedes District, Heredia =

District in Heredia canton, Heredia province, Costa Rica

Mercedes
- District
- Interactive map of Mercedes
- Mercedes district location in Costa Rica
- Coordinates: 10.0062029°N 84.1330732°W
- Country: Costa Rica
- Province: Heredia
- Canton: Heredia

Area
  - Total: 4.15 km^{2} (1.60 sq mi)
- Elevation: 1,130 m (3,710 ft)

Population (2011)
  - Total: 25,744
  - Density: 6,200/km^{2} (16,100/sq mi)
- Time zone: UTC−06:00
- Postal code: 40102

Mercedes is a district of the Heredia canton, in the Heredia province of Costa Rica.

== Geography ==
Mercedes has an area of 4.15 km^{2} and an elevation of 1,130 metres.

== Demographics ==
Historical population
Census	Pop.	±% p.a.
1864	879	—
1883	1,036	+0.87%
1892	1,135	+1.02%
1927	1,148	+0.03%
1950	1,561	+1.35%
1963	3,381	+6.13%
1973	6,536	+6.81%
1984	12,719	+6.24%
2000	19,717	+2.78%
2011	25,744	+2.45%
2022	29,612	+1.28%
Source: Instituto Nacional de Estadística y Censos; Centro Centroamericano de Población

For the 2011 census, Mercedes had a population of 25,744 inhabitants.

== Transportation ==
=== Road transportation ===
The district is covered by the following road routes:

- National Route 3
- National Route 111
- National Route 126

== Economy ==
The main industries in the city are textiles and food.

=== Rail transportation ===
The Interurbano Line operated by Incofer goes through this district.
