= San Isidro District, Alajuela =

District in Alajuela canton, Alajuela province, Costa Rica

San Isidro
- District
- San Isidro district
- San Isidro district location in Costa Rica
- Coordinates: 10.0904048°N 84.1959696°W
- Country: Costa Rica
- Province: Alajuela
- Canton: Alajuela

Area
  - Total: 36.09 km^{2} (13.93 sq mi)
- Elevation: 1,357 m (4,452 ft)

Population (2011)
  - Total: 17,294
  - Density: 479.2/km^{2} (1,241/sq mi)
- Time zone: UTC−06:00
- Postal code: 20106

San Isidro, also referred to as San Isidro de Alajuela, is a district of the Alajuela canton, in the Alajuela province of Costa Rica.

== Geography ==
San Isidro has an area of 36.09 km^{2} and an elevation of 1,357 metres.

== Demographics ==
Historical population
Census	Pop.	±% p.a.
1883	577	—
1927	2,306	+3.20%
1950	2,723	+0.73%
1963	5,180	+5.07%
1973	7,239	+3.40%
1984	10,118	+3.09%
2000	16,247	+3.00%
2011	17,294	+0.57%
2022	19,160	+0.94%
Source: Instituto Nacional de Estadística y Censos; Centro Centroamericano de Población

For the 2011 census, San Isidro had a population of 17,294 inhabitants.

== Transportation ==
=== Road transportation ===
The district is covered by the following road routes:

- National Route 126
- National Route 130
- National Route 712
- National Route 718
- National Route 719
- National Route 727
