= San Antonio District, Alajuela =

District in Alajuela canton, Alajuela province, Costa Rica

San Antonio
- District
- San Antonio district
- San Antonio district location in Costa Rica
- Coordinates: 9.9848938°N 84.2469339°W
- Country: Costa Rica
- Province: Alajuela
- Canton: Alajuela

Area
  - Total: 8.93 km^{2} (3.45 sq mi)
- Elevation: 870 m (2,850 ft)

Population (2011)
  - Total: 24,971
  - Density: 2,800/km^{2} (7,240/sq mi)
- Time zone: UTC−06:00
- Postal code: 20104

San Antonio is a district of the Alajuela canton, in the Alajuela province of Costa Rica.

== Geography ==
San Antonio has an area of 8.93 km^{2} and an elevation of 870 metres.

== Demographics ==
Historical population
Census	Pop.	±% p.a.
1883	1,222	—
1892	1,401	+1.53%
1927	1,172	−0.51%
1950	1,734	+1.72%
1963	3,728	+6.06%
1973	7,519	+7.27%
1984	11,471	+3.91%
2000	22,094	+4.18%
2011	24,971	+1.12%
2022	24,764	−0.08%
Source: Instituto Nacional de Estadística y Censos; Centro Centroamericano de Población

For the 2011 census, San Antonio had a population of 24,971 inhabitants.

== Transportation ==
=== Road transportation ===
The district is covered by the following road routes:

- National Route 1
- National Route 27
- National Route 122
- National Route 124
- National Route 721

=== Rail transportation ===
The Interurbano Line operated by Incofer goes through this district.
