= Margarita Madrigal =

American writer

Margarita Madrigal in the 1940s

Margarita Madrigal (May 15, 1912 – July 23, 1983) was a Costa Rican American author and language teacher best known for the Madrigal's Magic Key to... and An Invitation to... series. During her career, she wrote 25 books covering seven languages.

== Biography ==
=== Background ===
Margarita Madrigal's parents met in Kansas City while her father, Ezequías Madrigal (an operatic baritone from Costa Rica) was on tour in the United States. Before he was set to perform, his accompanist became ill. When he heard that a local girl, Carolyn Wilhelm of Winchester, Kansas, was an excellent concert pianist, he communicated to her to perform with him for the evening. She initially refused, but agreed after being asked in person. "The romance went on from there," as Margarita related in an interview.

=== Early life ===
Margarita Madrigal was born on May 15, 1912, in Alajuela, Costa Rica. She was followed by a sister, Marcella, and a brother, Miguel. During her childhood, Margarita moved many times with her family following her father's performances and teaching assignments across Latin America. By the time Margarita was 11, she had lived in Mexico and five Central American countries.

By 1923, her mother decided to send Margarita to live with relatives in Kansas City, fearing her daughter had forgotten too much English. There, she attended Wyandotte High School, which, she said, gave her "a little of the Kansas tradition."

=== Career ===
After graduating, Margarita returned to Mexico where she studied, and later taught, at the Puebla State Teachers College. In 1940, the University of Mexico (UNAM) commissioned her to make a survey of the study of Spanish in the United States. She first returned to Kansas City and then toured the country to research material for her thesis. In November 1940, she went to New York City, settled in Greenwich Village, and began offering private Spanish lessons. Madrigal also lectured at the Adult Education Department in a local YWCA. There, she taught classes using her own method using a textbook she was then completing. She described it as a "streamlined," simple method whereby the student learns conversational Spanish rapidly and has fun doing so.

By 1941, she had already achieved wide acclaim. Soon thereafter, she began to publish her learning techniques. The first of these works became known as the An Invitation to... series, starting with Spanish and Portuguese, and followed by French, Russian, Italian, English and German. The courses quickly became bestsellers, making her one of the most popular language authors in the country.

This was later followed by a series aimed at children, entitled First steps in..., and then by small, pocket-sized, carry-around language courses entitled, the See it & Say it in... series.

In the 1950s she wrote the Madrigal's Magic Key to... series, which featured more comprehensive and in-depth material than previous works. The first of these was Madrigal's Magic Key to Spanish in 1955. This was followed by similar works for French in 1959, and German in 1966. These later became her best known works. She also produced accompanying audio lessons for the Spanish and French books, however, few of these were sold.

During her career, Margarita could count amongst her students authors Sherwood Anderson, André Maurois and Ernest Hemingway, radio and television commentators Ben Grauer, H.V. Kaltenborn and World Tennis Champion Alice Marble. She was also employed by the FBI, the Rockefeller Institute, Time-Life International, as well as lending her services to numerous ambassadors, executives, judges, and generals.

==== 1957 lawsuit ====
In 1957, Margarita Madrigal was successfully sued for plagiarism related to her book An Invitation to Russian. The plaintiff, a Russian-born American named Fedor I. Nikanov, alleged that Madrigal (along with her co-author, Sonia Bleeker) had infringed his copyright of a Russian language chart and material from an unpublished manuscript, which he gave to Bleeker in the hopes of coauthoring a book with her.

Since Madrigal did not know Russian, not even simple sentences, she had to rely on Bleeker for translations. The book contained presentations of the Russian alphabet, expressions, cognate words, and even similar drawings. Although this amounted to only a small part of An Invitation to Russian, it formed a large part of Nikanov's work. Damages of $5,000 were awarded to Nikanov.

=== Later life and death ===
Margarita continued to teach and work on new editions and manuscripts of her existing courses until the 1970s. Although she continued private lessons in her Greenwich Village apartment, she increasingly spent time at her weekend and summer home in Mystic, Connecticut. Suffering from overwork and stress, she eventually moved there on a permanent basis.

During the final years of her life, Margarita began working on a history of the Founding Fathers, which she hoped could simplify and make it easier to understand just as she had done with languages. What ultimately became of this manuscript is unknown.

Margarita moved away from Mystic in 1979, relocating to Stamford, Connecticut. She died at her home there on July 23, 1983, following a battle with throat cancer. She was survived by her sister, Marcella of Puebla, Mexico.

Despite her publishing success and public acclaim throughout her career, Madrigal's legacy effectively ended with her death; with relatively little subsequent media attention. With the exception of some Spanish-language materials, her works have remained largely out of print since their initial publication.

== Personal life ==
While growing up, Margarita Madrigal received a thorough Pan-American background and learned to know and love the music, culture and customs of all the countries she lived in. Her mother taught all of her children English and instilled some of her Kansas background. They learned Spanish naturally and, from their father, a facility with languages.

From both parents, Margarita developed a special love and talent for music. She also made an intensive study of the folk music of Latin America, as well as the European classics and native United States folk songs. After classes, she would bring out her guitar, named Valentina, and play Latin American music to her students.

== Bibliography ==
- An Invitation to Spanish (1943) New York: Simon and Schuster ISBN 0671212222
- Initiation à l'espagnol (1943) Montreal: Éditions de l'Arbre
- An Invitation to Portuguese (1944) New York: Simon and Schuster
- An Invitation to French (1945) New York: Simon and Schuster ISBN 0671210300
- An Invitation to Russian (1949) New York: Simon and Schuster
- Madrigal's Magic Key to Spanish (1953) New York: Doubleday ISBN 0385410956
- Madrigal's Magic Key to French (1959) Garden City, New York: Doubleday ISBN 0385051204
- Open Door to Spanish (1959) New York: Regents ISBN 0883454270
- First Steps in Spanish: A beginner's book for children (1961) Englewood Cliffs, N.J.: Prentice Hall ISBN 0133191532
- See it and Say it in Italian (1961) New York: New American Library ISBN 0451168216
- See it and Say it in Spanish (1961) New York: New American Library ISBN 0451168372
- See it and Say it in French (1962) New York: Penguin Books USA ISBN 0451163478
- See it and Say it in German (1962) New York: New American Library ISBN 0451166787
- Open Door to French (1963) New York: Regents ISBN 0136372325
- First Steps in French: A beginner's book for children (1964) New York: Regents ISBN 0133192032
- An Invitation to Italian (1965) New York: Simon and Schuster ISBN 0671381202
- Invitación al angles (1965) New York: Latin American Institute Press
- Madrigal's Magic Key to German (1966) Garden City, New York: Doubleday ISBN 0385036388
- An Invitation to German (1971) New York: Simon and Schuster ISBN 0671209566

== Quotes ==
- "Latin Americans, on the whole, are passionate lovers of democracy. They believe in education and freedom of speech. Costa Rica, for instance, is the most peaceful country I have ever been in. There, we have 14 school teachers for every soldier."
- "It is important for Americans to learn Spanish and what Latin Americans really are like."
- "My tools are a Blackwing pencil, a yellow legal pad, and, when I am lucky, a flood of thoughts."

== Resources ==
- Blanck, Katherine (11 February 1941), "Her Pan-American Relations Really Are!" (PDF), The Brooklyn Eagle, Brooklyn, New York, p. 10
- Slosberg, Steven (6 March 1978), "Margarita Madrigal—Dedicated to being extraordinary", The Day, New London, Connecticut, p. 13
- "Margarita Madrigal", The Day, New London, Connecticut, p. 19, 30 July 1983
- Slosberg, Steven (2 August 1983), "Miss Madrigal's presence", The Day, New London, Connecticut, p. 19
- Slosberg, Steven (February 27, 2003), "Author Knew Warhol Before His 15 Minutes", The Day, New London, Connecticut, p. B1
