= San Rafael District, Alajuela =

District in Alajuela canton, Alajuela province, Costa Rica

San Rafael
- District
- San Rafael district
- San Rafael district location in Costa Rica
- Coordinates: 9.9594822°N 84.2221335°W
- Country: Costa Rica
- Province: Alajuela
- Canton: Alajuela

Area
  - Total: 19.29 km^{2} (7.45 sq mi)
- Elevation: 845 m (2,772 ft)

Population (2022)
  - Total: 54,730
  - Density: 2,837/km^{2} (7,348/sq mi)
- Time zone: UTC−06:00
- Postal code: 20108

San Rafael is a district of the Alajuela canton, in the Alajuela province of Costa Rica.

== Geography ==
San Rafael has an area of 19.29 km^{2} and an elevation of 845 metres.

== Demographics ==
Historical population
Census	Pop.	±% p.a.
1864	952	—
1883	1,245	+1.42%
1892	1,365	+1.03%
1927	1,812	+0.81%
1950	2,245	+0.94%
1963	3,719	+3.96%
1973	5,517	+4.02%
1984	8,848	+4.39%
2000	19,162	+4.95%
2011	26,248	+2.90%
2022	54,730	+6.91%
Source: Instituto Nacional de Estadística y Censos; Centro Centroamericano de Población

For the 2011 census, San Rafael had a population of 26,248 inhabitants.

== Transportation ==
=== Road transportation ===
The district is covered by the following road routes:

- National Route 27
- National Route 122
- National Route 124
- National Route 147

=== Rail transportation ===
The Interurbano Line operated by Incofer goes through this district.
