= National Route 129 (Costa Rica) =

National Road Route in Costa Rica

National Secondary Route 129
- Ruta nacional secundaria 129

Route information
- Maintained by Ministry of Public Works and Transport
- Length: 5.130 km (3.188 mi)

Location
- Country: Costa Rica
- Provinces: Heredia

Highway system
- National Road Network of Costa Rica
← Route 128	→ Route 130

National Secondary Route 129, or just Route 129 (Spanish: Ruta Nacional Secundaria 129, or Ruta 129) is a National Road Route of Costa Rica located in the Heredia province.

== Description ==
In Heredia province the route covers Belén canton (La Ribera district) and Flores canton (Llorente district).

== History ==
As part of the OBIS improvements over Route 1, the intersection between that route and Route 129 saw gains in the widening of the lanes to improve traffic.
