= National Route 721 (Costa Rica) =

National Road Route in Costa Rica

National Tertiary Route 721
- Ruta nacional terciaria 721

Route information
- Maintained by Ministry of Public Works and Transport
- Length: 14.355 km (8.920 mi)

Location
- Country: Costa Rica
- Provinces: Alajuela

Highway system
- National Road Network of Costa Rica
← Route 720	→ Route 722

National Tertiary Route 721, or just Route 721 (Spanish: Ruta Nacional Terciaria 721, or Ruta 721) is a National Road Route of Costa Rica located in the Alajuela province.

== Description ==
In Alajuela province the route covers Alajuela canton (San Antonio, Turrúcares, and Garita districts).
