= San Francisco District, Heredia =

District in Heredia canton, Heredia province, Costa Rica

San Francisco
- District
- San Francisco district
- San Francisco district location in Costa Rica
- Coordinates: 9.9855772°N 84.1368109°W
- Country: Costa Rica
- Province: Heredia
- Canton: Heredia

Area
  - Total: 6.43 km^{2} (2.48 sq mi)
- Elevation: 1,124 m (3,688 ft)

Population (2011)
  - Total: 49,209
  - Density: 7,650/km^{2} (19,800/sq mi)
- Time zone: UTC−06:00
- Postal code: 40103

San Francisco is a district of the Heredia canton in the Heredia province of Costa Rica.

== Geography ==
San Francisco has an area of 6.43 km^{2} (2.48 sq mi) and an elevation of 1,124 metres.

== Demographics ==
Historical population
Census	Pop.	±% p.a.
1864	746	—
1883	916	+1.09%
1892	886	−0.37%
1927	518	−1.52%
1950	831	+2.08%
1963	1,001	+1.44%
1973	2,451	+9.37%
1984	12,770	+16.19%
2000	40,840	+7.54%
2011	49,209	+1.71%
2022	48,804	−0.08%
Source: Instituto Nacional de Estadística y Censos; Centro Centroamericano de Población

For the 2011 census, San Francisco had a population of 49,209 inhabitants.

== Transportation ==
=== Road transportation ===
The district is covered by the following road routes:

- National Route 3
- National Route 111
- National Route 171

=== Rail transportation ===
The Interurbano Line operated by Incofer goes through this district.
