= National Route 718 (Costa Rica) =

National Road Route in Costa Rica

National Tertiary Route 718
- Ruta nacional terciaria 718

Route information
- Maintained by Ministry of Public Works and Transport
- Length: 5.080 km (3.157 mi)

Location
- Country: Costa Rica
- Provinces: Alajuela

Highway system
- National Road Network of Costa Rica
← Route 717	→ Route 719

National Tertiary Route 718, or just Route 718 (Spanish: Ruta Nacional Terciaria 718, or Ruta 718) is a National Road Route of Costa Rica located in the Alajuela province.

== Description ==
In Alajuela province the route covers Alajuela canton (San Isidro and Tambor districts).
