= National Route 727 (Costa Rica) =

National Road Route in Costa Rica

National Tertiary Route 727
- Ruta nacional terciaria 727

Route information
- Maintained by Ministry of Public Works and Transport
- Length: 4.205 km (2.613 mi)

Location
- Country: Costa Rica
- Provinces: Alajuela

Highway system
- National Road Network of Costa Rica
← Route 726	→ Route 728

National Tertiary Route 727, or just Route 727 (Spanish: Ruta Nacional Terciaria 727, or Ruta 727) is a National Road Route of Costa Rica located in the Alajuela province.

== Description ==
In Alajuela province the route covers Alajuela canton (San José, San Isidro, and Tambor districts).
