= National Route 719 (Costa Rica) =

National Road Route in Costa Rica

National Tertiary Route 719
- Ruta nacional terciaria 719

Route information
- Maintained by Ministry of Public Works and Transport
- Length: 5.130 km (3.188 mi)

Location
- Country: Costa Rica
- Provinces: Alajuela

Highway system
- National Road Network of Costa Rica
← Route 718	→ Route 720

National Tertiary Route 719, or just Route 719 (Spanish: Ruta Nacional Terciaria 719, or Ruta 719) is a National Road Route of Costa Rica located in the Alajuela province.

== Description ==
In Alajuela province the route covers Alajuela canton (San Isidro and Tambor districts).
