= National Route 712 (Costa Rica) =

National Road Route in Costa Rica

National Tertiary Route 712
- Ruta nacional terciaria 712

Route information
- Maintained by Ministry of Public Works and Transport
- Length: 9.000 km (5.592 mi)

Location
- Country: Costa Rica
- Provinces: Alajuela

Highway system
- National Road Network of Costa Rica
← Route 711	→ Route 713

National Tertiary Route 712, or just Route 712 (Spanish: Ruta Nacional Terciaria 712, or Ruta 712) is a National Road Route of Costa Rica. It is located in the Alajuela province.

== Description ==
In Alajuela province the route covers Alajuela canton (San Isidro and Sabanilla districts).
