= Alajuela =

District in Alajuela canton, Alajuela province, Costa Rica

- District, City
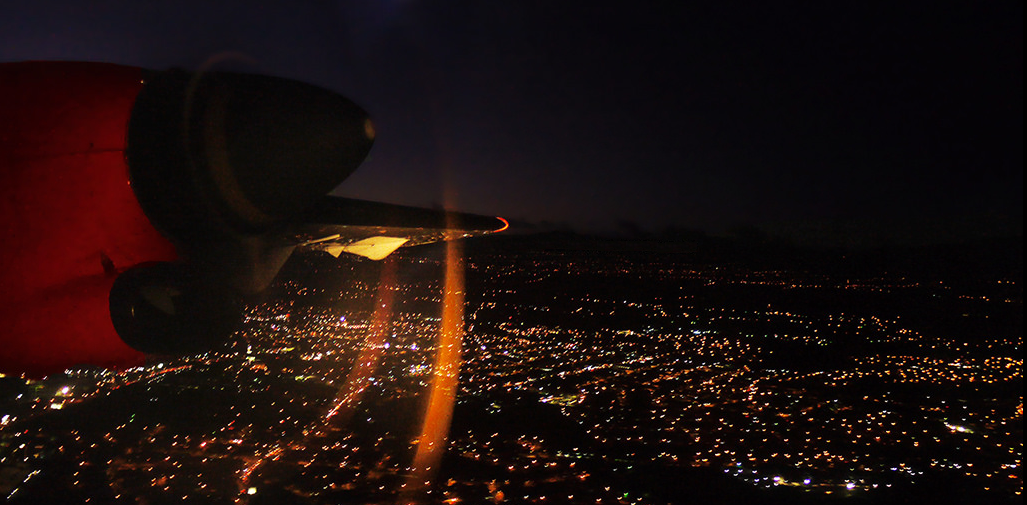
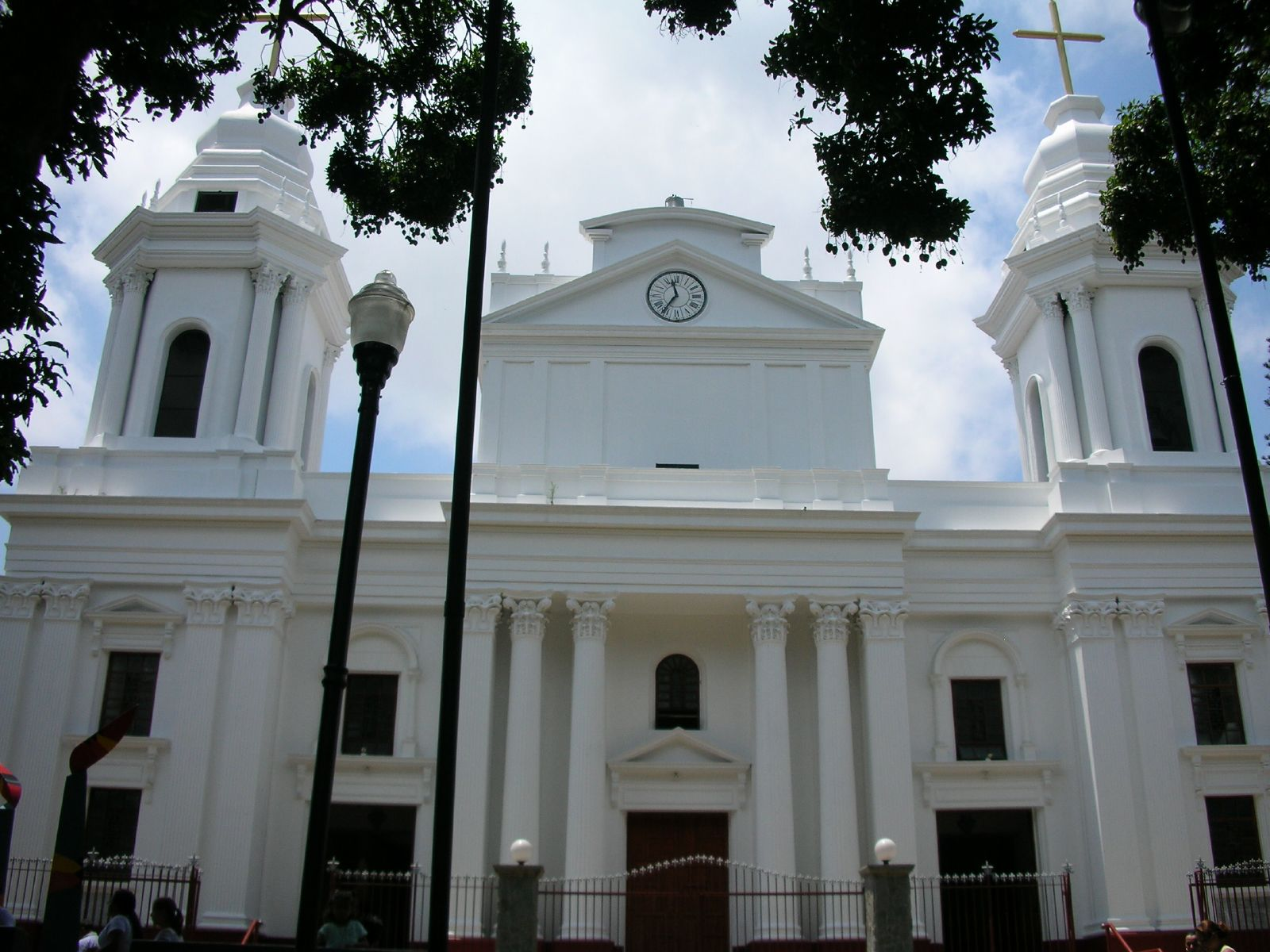
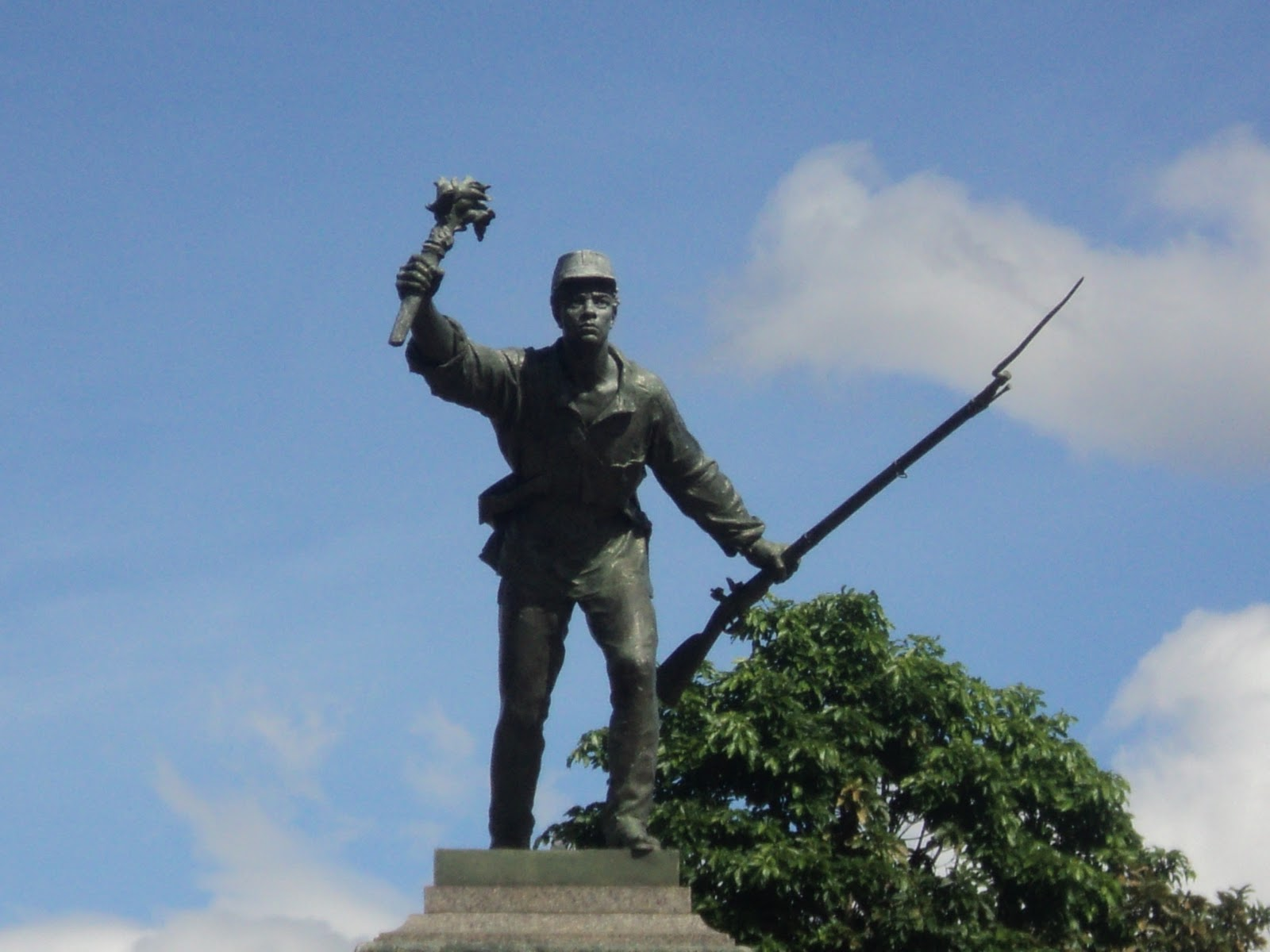
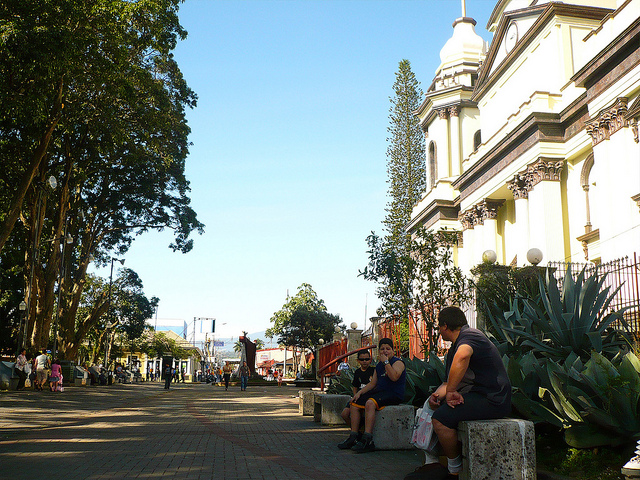
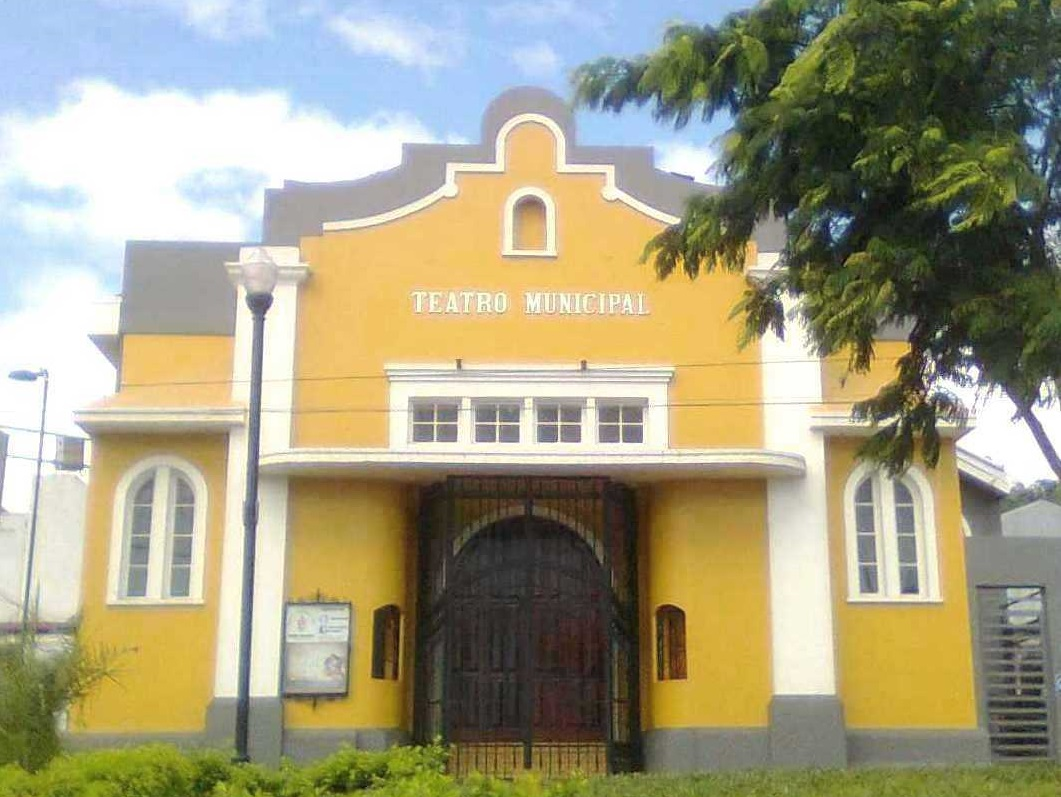
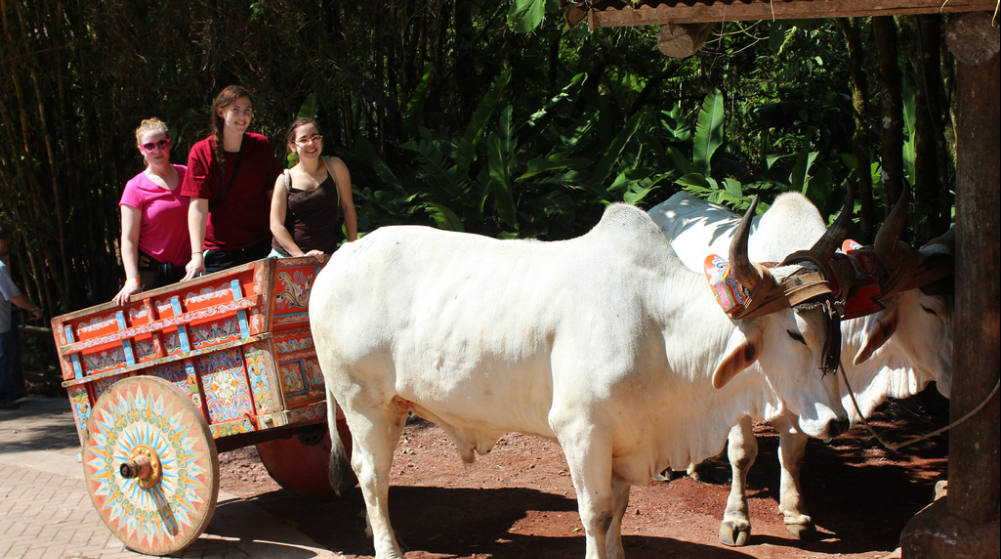
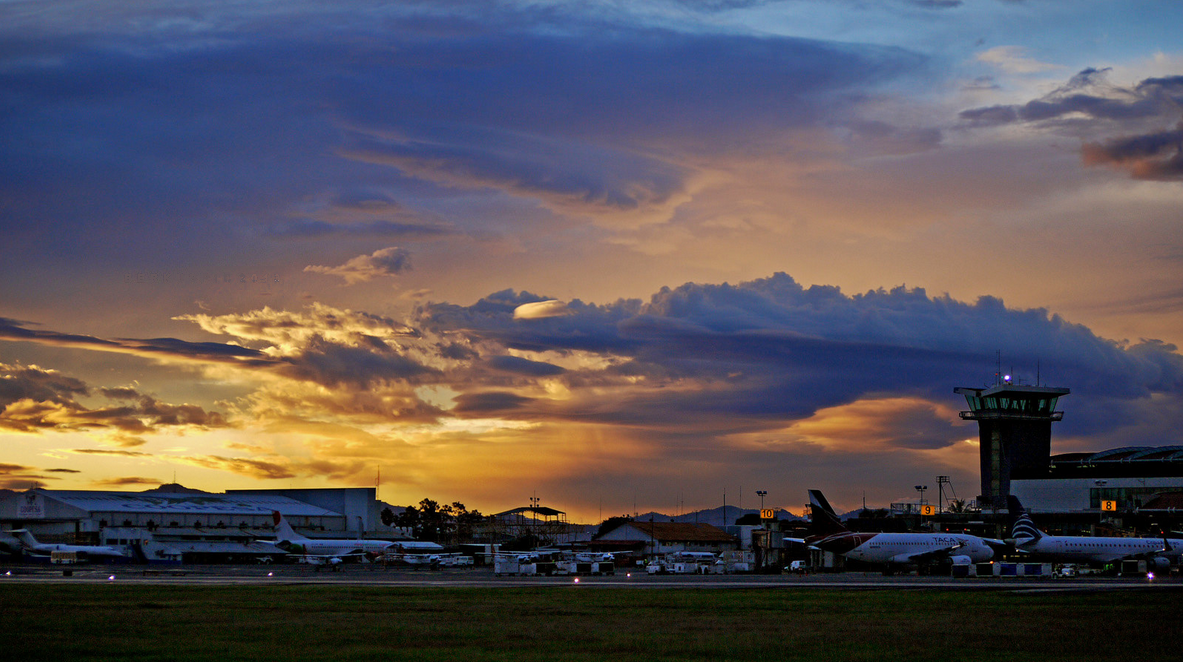
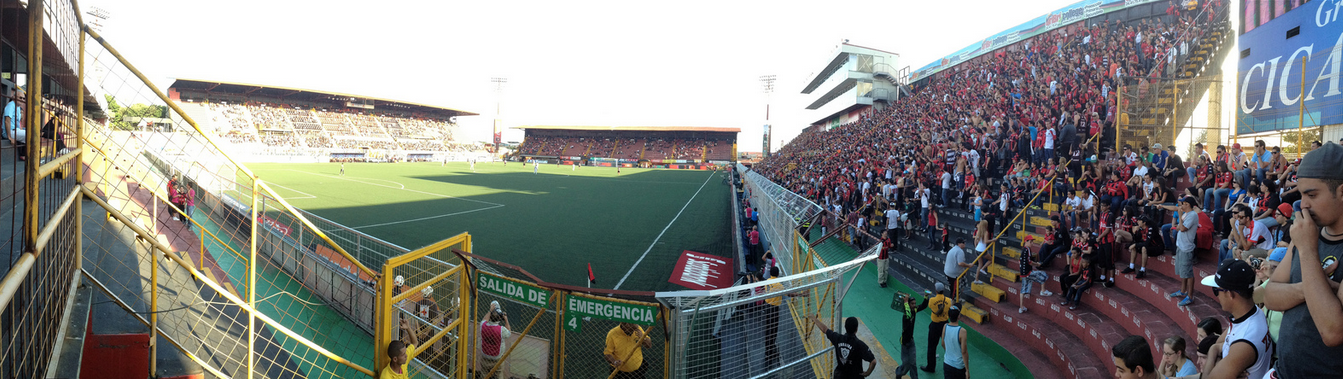
- Images, from top down, left to right: Alajuela skyline at night, Central Church, Juan Santamaría Statue, Central Park, Municipal Theater, a traditional Costa Rican bullock cart, the Juan Santamaría International Airport, Alejandro Morera Soto Stadium.

- Flag Coat of arms
- Nickname: Ciudad de los Mangos (City of Mangoes)
- Motto: Pro Patria Nostra — Sanguis Noster; For our country, our blood
- Interactive map of Alajuela
- Location of Alajuela within Costa Rica
- Coordinates: 10°01′N 84°13′W
- Country: Costa Rica
- Province: Alajuela Province
- Canton: Alajuela
- Founded: 1782

Government
  - Syndic: Francisco Salazar Sánchez

Area
  - Total: 8.88 km^{2} (3.43 sq mi)
- Elevation: 952 m (3,123 ft)

Population (2011)
  - Total: 42,975
  - Density: 4,840/km^{2} (12,500/sq mi)
- Time zone: UTC−06:00
- Postal code: 20101
- Climate: Aw
- Website: Official website

Alajuela (Spanish pronunciation: [alaˈxwela]) is a district in the Alajuela canton of the Alajuela Province of Costa Rica. As the seat of the Municipality of Alajuela canton, it is awarded the status of city. By virtue of being the city of the first canton of the province, it is also the capital of the Province of Alajuela.

Because of its location in the Costa Rican Central Valley, Alajuela is nowadays part of the conurbation of the Greater Metropolitan Area. The city is the birthplace of Juan Santamaría, the national hero of Costa Rica and the figure who gives the name to the country's main international airport, which is south of Alajuela downtown.

== Geography ==
Alajuela has an area of 8.89 km^{2} (3.43 sq mi) and an elevation of 952 metres (3,123 ft). It is located in the Central Valley, 19 kilometres northwest of San José.

== Climate ==
The climate is tropical, typical of the Central Valley, but slightly warmer than San José. Temperatures are moderate, averaging 23–26 degrees Celsius (73–79 degrees Fahrenheit) with a low humidity level, with dewpoints around 20 (68 °F) almost all year round. Alajuela and its surroundings are famed for having "the best weather in the world".

Climate data for Alajuela (1956–2003)
Month	Jan	Feb	Mar	Apr	May	Jun	Jul	Aug	Sep	Oct	Nov	Dec	Year
Mean daily maximum °C (°F)	27.8 (82.0)	28.6 (83.5)	29.6 (85.3)	29.7 (85.5)	28.4 (83.1)	27.6 (81.7)	27.7 (81.9)	28.7 (83.7)	27.3 (81.1)	27.1 (80.8)	27.2 (81.0)	27.5 (81.5)	28.1 (82.6)
Mean daily minimum °C (°F)	17.5 (63.5)	17.6 (63.7)	17.8 (64.0)	18.3 (64.9)	18.4 (65.1)	18.2 (64.8)	18.4 (65.1)	18.1 (64.6)	17.7 (63.9)	17.6 (63.7)	17.8 (64.0)	17.7 (63.9)	17.9 (64.3)
Average precipitation mm (inches)	7.6 (0.30)	12.6 (0.50)	17.4 (0.69)	79.6 (3.13)	271.2 (10.68)	265.6 (10.46)	177.5 (6.99)	253.8 (9.99)	340.6 (13.41)	338.5 (13.33)	148.5 (5.85)	32.8 (1.29)	1,945.7 (76.62)
Average precipitation days	2.0	1.9	3.0	8.2	21.6	23.3	20.1	21.8	25.2	25.5	16.0	5.9	174.5
Source: World Meteorological Organization

== Demographics ==
Historical population
Census	Pop.	±% p.a.
1864	2,339	—
1883	3,532	+2.19%
1892	3,828	+0.90%
1927	8,496	+2.30%
1950	13,903	+2.16%
1963	24,224	+4.36%
1973	33,122	+3.18%
1984	34,556	+0.39%
2000	42,889	+1.36%
2011	42,975	+0.02%
2022	44,374	+0.29%
Source: Instituto Nacional de Estadística y Censos; Centro Centroamericano de Población

For the 2011 census, Alajuela had a population of 42,975 inhabitants.

== History ==
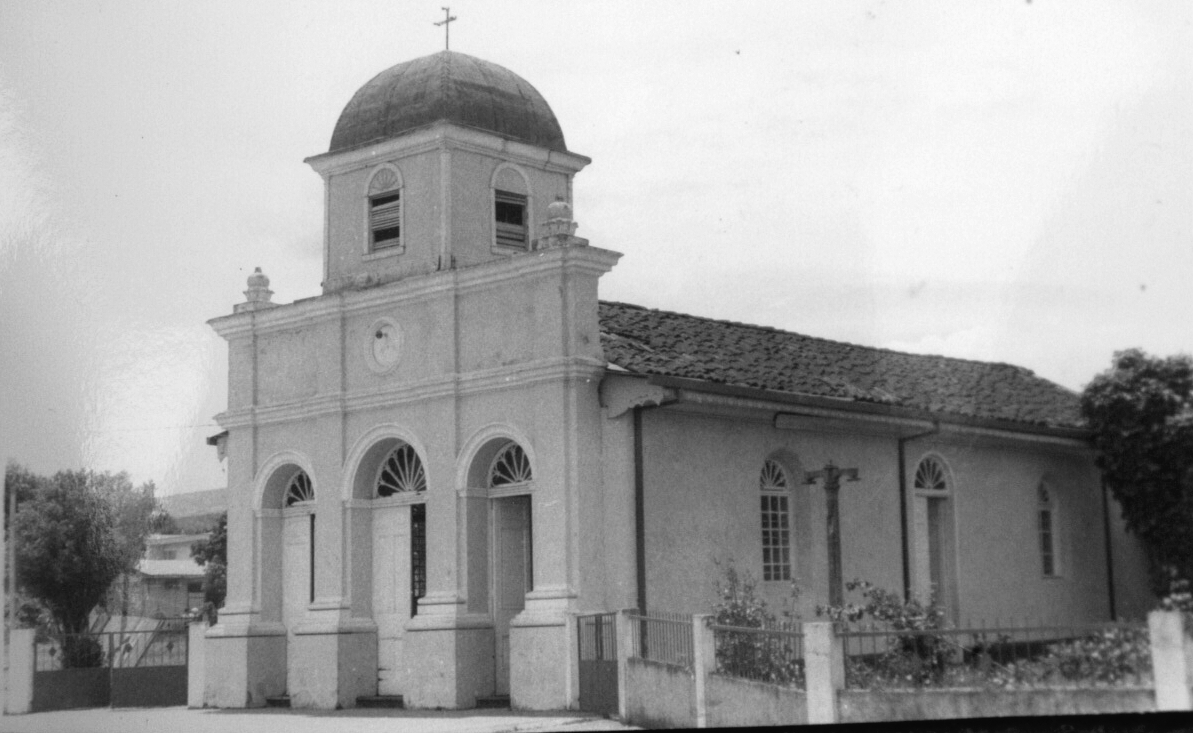
El Llano old hermitage

In pre-Columbian times, the land where the canton of Alajuela is today was part of the Western Huetar Kingdom, which was inhabited by native tribes, who at the time of the Spanish conquest were led by Chief Garabito.

The first Spanish settlers established settlements in the region in about 1650. In a letter of obligation granted in 1764, the place is mentioned as La Lajuela in the Valley of Barva, near the Canoas river.

In 1777, the dwellers of La Lajuela and Ciruelas, having been served with notice to move to Villa Vieja (today's Heredia), requested the provisional construction of a public place of prayer in the house of Don Dionysius Oconitrillo, of Spanish origin, 30 metres north of where Alajuela's cathedral is today.

After population increases in the five existing quarters: Targuaz, Puás, Ciruelas, La Lajuela, and Rio Grande, the citizens faced difficulties maintaining their religious obligations, so they requested permission to establish a parish and a public place of prayer from the Bishop of Nicaragua and Costa Rica, Monsignor don Esteban Lorenzo de Tristán.

According to a motion issued in the Spanish Parliament of Cádiz on 19 May 1812, the first town hall of Alajuela was founded in 1813. On 18 December of the same year, the La Lajuela quarter obtained the title of town and it was renamed. It was first called "Villa Hermosa", then it was called "San Juan Nepomuceno de Alajuela" and finally the title of city was granted on 20 November 1824 and with it the name "Alajuela" which remains today.

Participation in important historical events by citizens of Alajuela has ensured the city's reputation as a storied place in Costa Rican history. The national hero Juan Santamaría, who died during the Filibuster War in 1856 to remove invaders threatening Costa Rica's sovereignty, was born in Alajuela. This historical event is celebrated and remembered every year on 11 April and it is a national holiday.

The area often experiences earthquakes. The 2009 magnitude 6.1 earthquake caused several landslides.

== Economy ==
The main exports of the region are coffee, sugar-cane, maize, beans, tobacco, citrus fruits, strawberries, tubers like cassava, flowers and ornamental plants. Other commercial activities include poultry farming, beekeeping, pig farming and the dairy industry. More recently, Alajuela has seen important investment in free zone parks and heavy industry companies, with a considerable number of them dedicated to manufacturing a variety of medical devices.

== Transportation ==
Alajuela is an important transport hub for the country, connecting the capital city of San José with northwestern Costa Rica. As a part of the Greater Metropolitan Area, most of the inhabitants of Alajuela work in other cities or regions of the Central Valley, and every day receives residents from other locations to work in local factories. Central America's second busiest airport, Juan Santamaría International Airport, is three kilometers south of the district center.

=== Road transportation ===
The district is covered by the following road routes:

- National Route 3
- National Route 123
- National Route 124
- National Route 125
- National Route 130
- National Route 153

=== Rail transportation ===
The Interurbano Line operated by Incofer goes through this district.

== Sports ==
Liga Deportiva Alajuelense is the province's major football club, having won 30 league titles. The club has a historical rivalry with Deportivo Saprissa, both popularly viewed as the two best football clubs of Costa Rica. They play their home games at the Estadio Alejandro Morera Soto, located in this district, and a new stadium is currently being built on another location inside the Alajuela Province.

== Gallery ==
Juan Santamaría International Airport

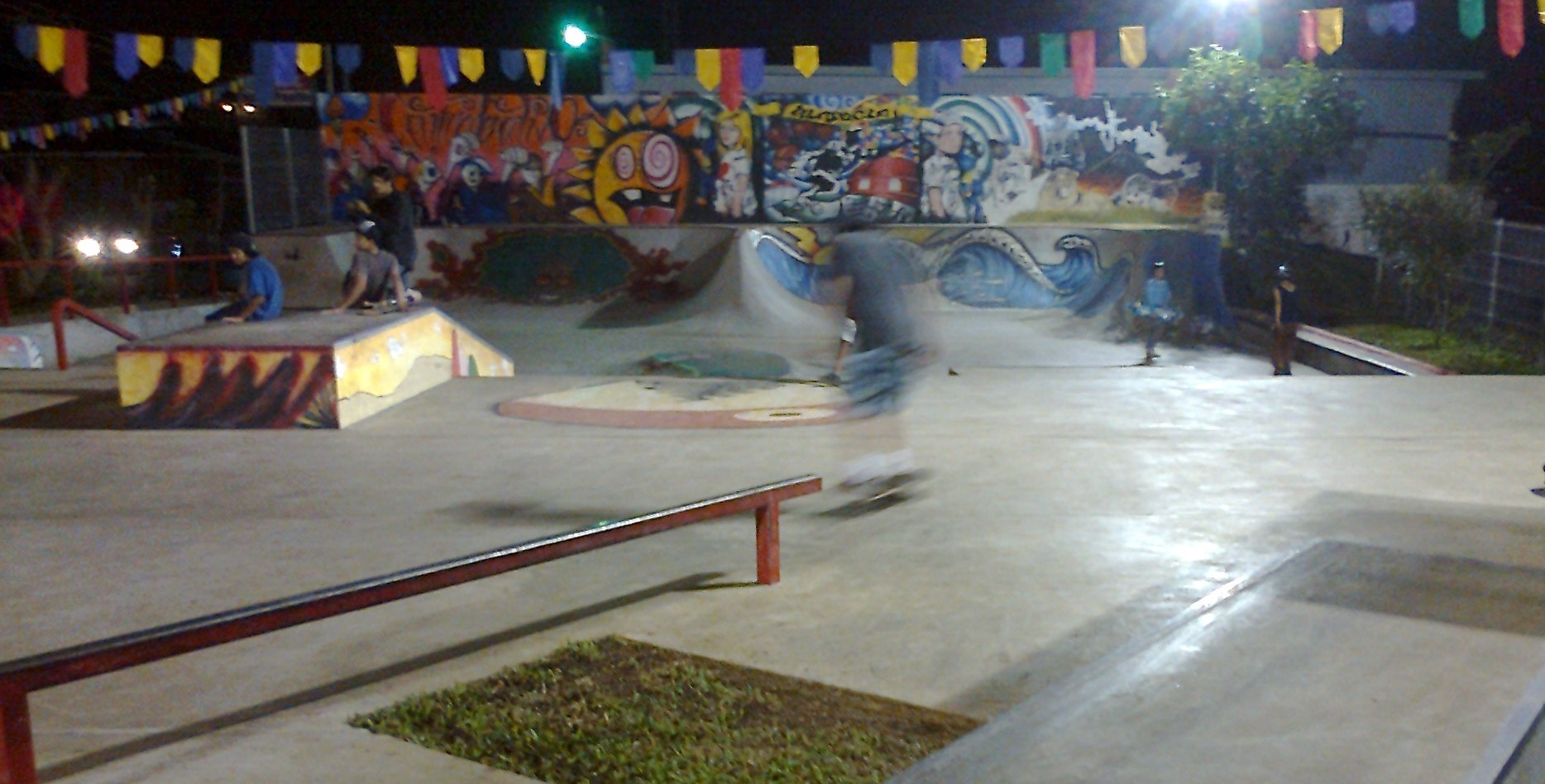
Alajuela skatepark

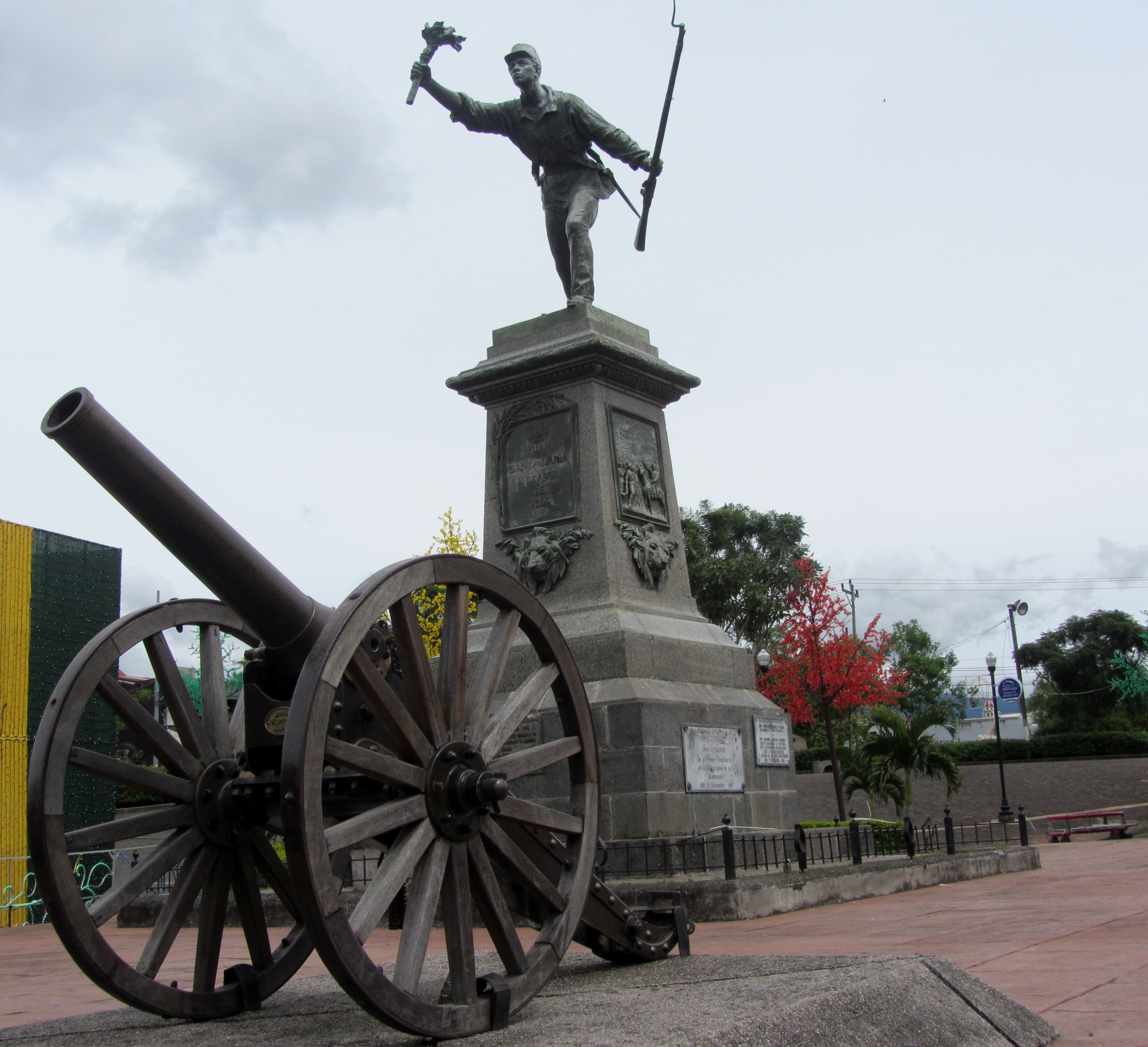
Monument to Juan Santamaria, who was born in Alajuela, popular hero of the Filibuster War

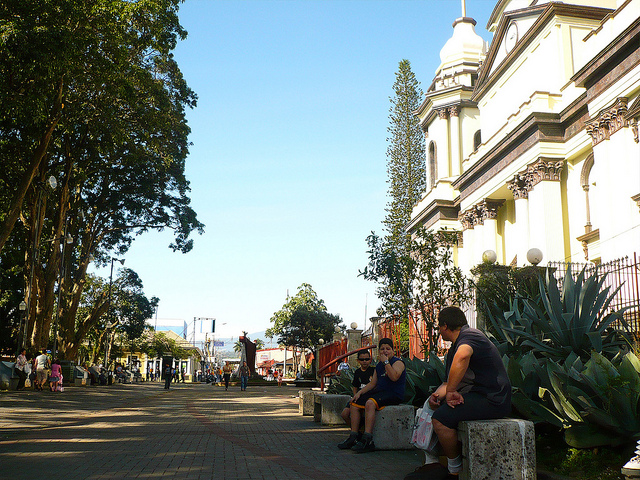
Alajuela's catholic Cathedral, located in front of Alajuela's central park (officially named Parque General Tomás Guardia)

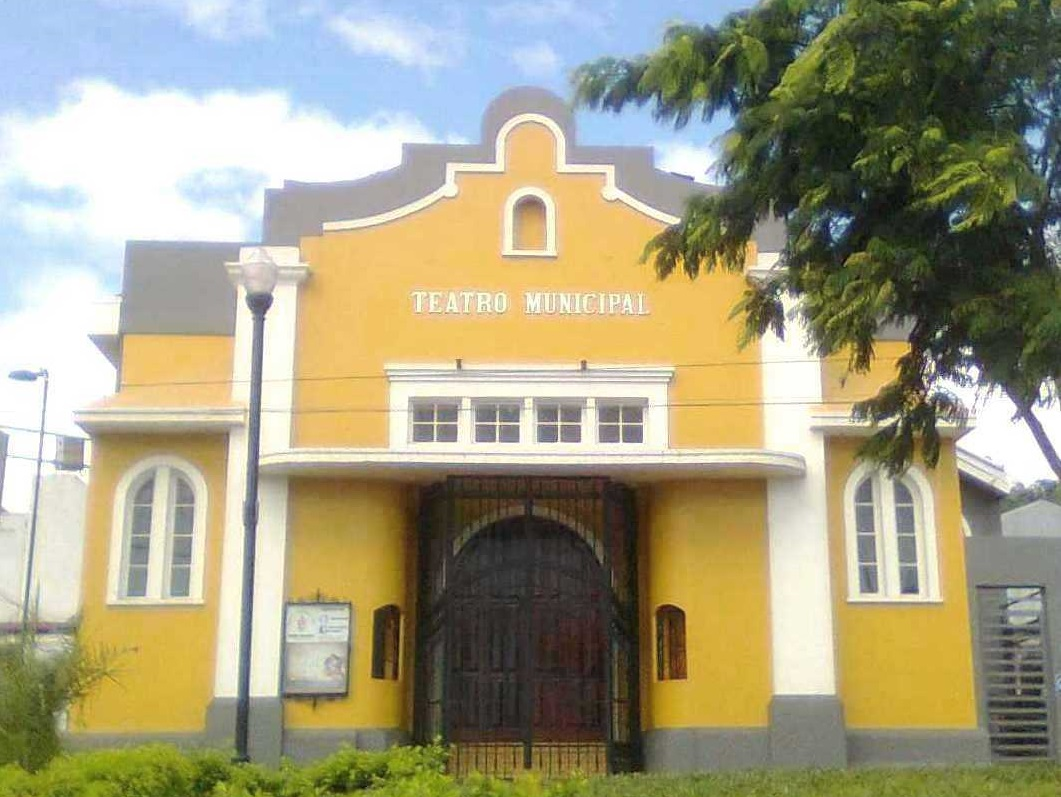
Municipal Theatre of Alajuela

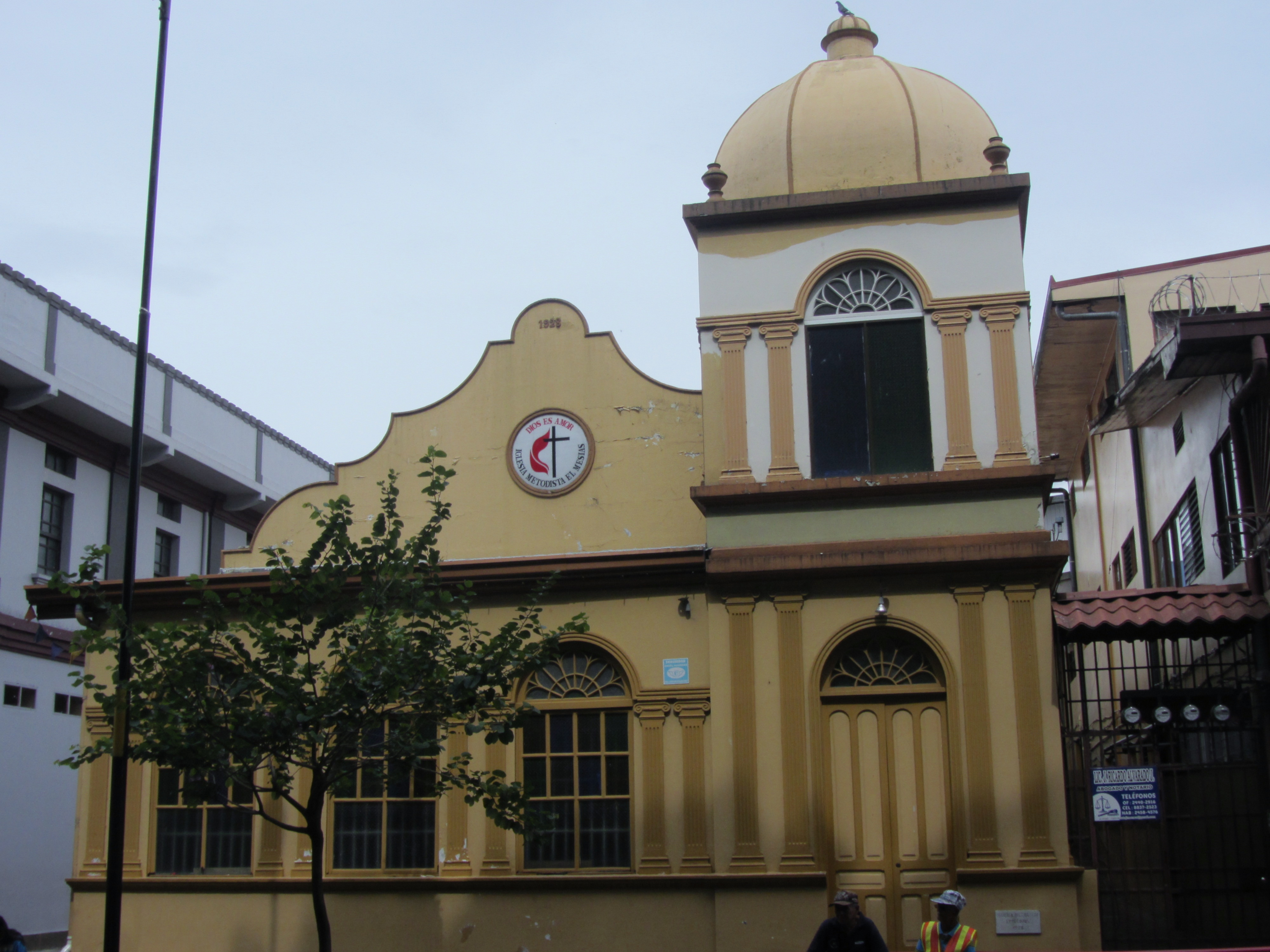
Alajuela's Methodist Church

== Sister cities ==
- San Bartolomé de Tirajana, Spain
- Lahr, Germany
- Montegrotto Terme, Italy
- Bordano, Italy
- (United States) Downey, California, USA
- (United States) Dothan, Alabama, USA
- Guadalajara, Mexico
- Ibaraki Prefecture, Japan
- Hangzhou, China

== Notable residents ==
=== Historical ===
- Gregorio Jose Ramirez (1796–1823) Politician, Military Commander.
- José María Alfaro Zamora (1799–1856) Costa Rican Head of State (1842–44, 1846–47)
- Florentino Alfaro Zamora (1805–1873) Politician
- Juan Alfaro Ruiz (1810–1856) Politician
- Jose Maria Figueroa (1820–1900) Artist. He recorded the early events of Costa Rican history in his Album de Figueroa
- Apolinar de Jesus Soto (1827–1911) Vice-President of Costa Rica (1886–1889). The title was called then Primer Designado
- Juan Santamaría (1831–1856) Costa Rican national hero.
- Tomás Guardia Gutiérrez (1831–1882) President of Costa Rica (1870–82) Born in Bagaces, Guardia married and lived in Alajuela most of his life
- Emilia Solórzano Alfaro (1835–1914) Costa Rican First lady (1870–1882) For her activism in favor of Education and Human Rights, she was declared Benemerita de la Patria in 1972.
- Leon Fernandez Bonilla (1840–1887) Historian, Lawyer, Diplomat, Journalist. Declared Benemerito de la Patria (Distinguished Citizen) in 1994.
- Bernardo Soto Alfaro (1854–1931) President of Costa Rica (1885–1889)
- Anastasio Alfaro (1865–1951) Zoologist, Geologist, Archeologist, Ethnologist. Creator of the Museo Nacional de Costa Rica.
- Ricardo Fernandez Guardia (1867–1950) Historian, Author, Diplomat. Declared Benemerito de la Patria (Distinguished Citizen) in 1944.
- León Cortés Castro (1882–1946) President of Costa Rica (1936–40)
- Otilio Ulate (1891–1973) President of Costa Rica (1949–53)
- Carlos Luis Fallas (1909–1966) Costa Rican most important author, political activist. Elected for the Congress (1944–48). Posthumously declared Benemérito de la Patria (Distinguished Citizen) in 1977.
- Alejandro Morera Soto (1909–1995) Footballer. Played with LD Alajuelense in Costa Rica, and FC Barcelona, Spain.
- Margarita Madrigal (1919–1983) Best-selling author of language textbooks.

=== Born in or live in Alajuela ===
- Fernando Durán (1939– ) Author
- Edgar Zúñiga (1950– ) Sculptor
- Jorge Arroyo (1959– ) Playwright
