= Heredia (canton) =

Canton in Heredia province, Costa Rica

- Canton
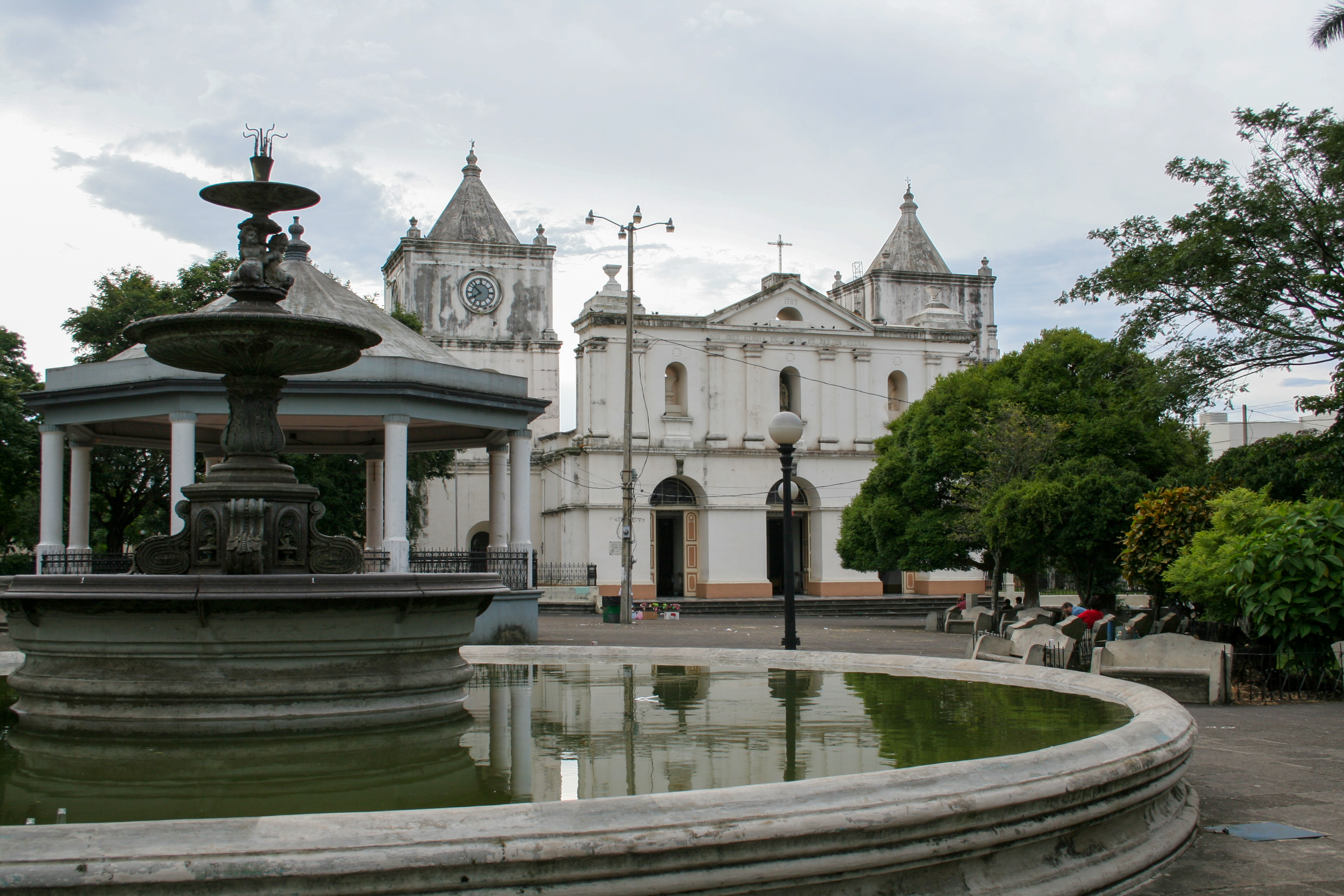
- Inmaculada Concepción Church, Heredia

- Flag Seal
- Interactive map of Heredia
- Heredia canton location in Costa Rica
- Coordinates: 10.1289028°N 84.0419806°W
- Country: Costa Rica
- Province: Heredia
- Creation: 7 December 1848
- Head city: Heredia
- Districts: Districts: Heredia; Mercedes; San Francisco; Ulloa; Varablanca

Government
  - Type: Municipality
  - Body: Municipalidad de Heredia
  - Mayor: Ángela Ileana Aguilar Vargas (PLN)

Area
  - Total: 282.6 km^{2} (109.1 sq mi)
- Elevation: 1,242 m (4,075 ft)

Population (2011)
  - Total: 123,616
  - Estimate (2022): 131,901
  - Density: 437.4/km^{2} (1,133/sq mi)
- Time zone: UTC−06:00
- Canton code: 401
- Website: www.heredia.go.cr/en

Heredia is a canton in the Heredia province of Costa Rica. The head city is in Heredia district, and is also the provincial capital of Heredia Province.

== History ==
Heredia was created on 7 December, 1848 by decree 167.

== Geography ==
Heredia has an area of 283.11 km^{2} (109.31 sq mi) and a mean elevation of 1,242 m (4,075 ft).

The canton includes the areas south and west of the capital city of Heredia as far as the Virilla River and the National Route 1.

The non-contiguous district of Varablanca, which includes a large portion of Braulio Carrillo National Park high in the Cordillera Central, is also administered as part of Heredia Canton.

== Government ==
=== Mayor ===
According to Costa Rica's Municipal Code, mayors are elected every four years by the population of the canton. As of the latest municipal elections in 2024, the National Liberation Party candidate, Ángela Ileana Aguilar Vargas, was elected mayor of the canton with 31.58% of the votes, with Víctor Andrés Sánchez González and Kenneth Armando Arguedas Navarro as first and second vice mayors, respectively.

Mayors of Heredia since the 2002 elections
Period	Name	Party
2002–2006	Javiel Carvajal Molina	PUSC
2006–2010	José Manuel Ulate Avendaño	PLN
2010–2016	José Manuel Ulate Avendaño	PLN
2016–2020	José Manuel Ulate Avendaño	PLN
2020–2024	José Manuel Ulate Avendaño	PLN
2024–2028	Ángela Ileana Aguilar Vargas	PLN

=== Municipal Council ===
Like the mayor and vice mayors, members of the Municipal Council (called regidores) are elected every four years. Heredia's Municipal Council has 9 seats for regidores and their substitutes, who can participate in meetings but not vote unless the owning regidor (regidor propietario) is absent. The current president of the Municipal Council is the Sentir Heredia regidor, José Pablo Quesada Castro, with National Liberation Party member, Heidy Hernández Benavides, as vice president. The Municipal Council's composition for the 2024–2028 period is as follows:

Current composition of the Municipal Council of Heredia after the 2024 municipal elections
Political parties in the Municipal Council of Heredia
Political party	Regidores		
Political party	№	Owner	Substitute
National Liberation Party (PLN)	3	Lilliana Jiménez Barrientos	Maritza Sandoval Vega
National Liberation Party (PLN)	3	Luis Alfonso Araya Villalobos	Alfredo Eduardo Prendas Jiménez
National Liberation Party (PLN)	3	Heidy Hernández Benavides^{(VP)}	Odette Fernández Salazar
Social Christian Unity Party (PUSC)	3	Marlon Antonio Obando Juárez	Jean Carlos Barboza Roman
Social Christian Unity Party (PUSC)	3	Roxana Mayela Arias Ramírez	Maribel Quesada Fonseca
Social Christian Unity Party (PUSC)	3	Luis Alberto Williams Ovares	Freddy Cervantes Paniagua
Social Democratic Progress Party (PSD)	1	Jorge Eduardo Blanco Chan	Manrique Ortíz Paniagua
Broad Front (FA)	1	José Daniel Berrocal Miranda	Fidel Barrera Romero
Feel Heredia (SH)	1	José Pablo Quesada Castro^{(P)}	Esteban Felipe Venegas Murillo

== Districts ==
The canton of Heredia is subdivided into the following districts:

1. Heredia
2. Mercedes
3. San Francisco
4. Ulloa
5. Varablanca

== Demographics ==
Historical population
Census	Pop.	±% p.a.
1864	14,073	—
1883	16,452	+0.83%
1892	16,480	+0.02%
1927	12,667	−0.75%
1950	19,898	+1.98%
1963	30,919	+3.45%
1973	36,487	+1.67%
1984	54,896	+3.78%
2000	103,894	+4.07%
2011	123,616	+1.59%
2022	131,901	+0.59%
Source: Instituto Nacional de Estadística y Censos; Centro Centroamericano de Población

In 2022, the National Institute of Statistics and Census estimated Heredia's population at 131,901, up from 123,616 at the time of the 2011 census.

According to a publication by the United Nations Development Programme, Heredia had a Human Development Index of 0.816 in 2022, ranking it 4th in its province and 9th in the entire country.

== Transportation ==
=== Road transportation ===
The canton is covered by the following road routes:

- National Route 1
- National Route 3
- National Route 5
- National Route 103
- National Route 106
- National Route 111
- National Route 112
- National Route 113
- National Route 120
- National Route 126
- National Route 171

=== Rail transportation ===
The Interurbano Line operated by Incofer goes through this canton.
