= National Route 153 (Costa Rica) =

National Road Route in Costa Rica

National Secondary Route 153
- Ruta nacional secundaria 153

Route information
- Maintained by Ministry of Public Works and Transport
- Length: 1.670 km (1.038 mi)

Location
- Country: Costa Rica
- Provinces: Alajuela

Highway system
- National Road Network of Costa Rica
← Route 152	→ Route 154

National Secondary Route 153, or just Route 153 (Spanish: Ruta Nacional Secundaria 153, or Ruta 153) is a National Road Route of Costa Rica located in the Alajuela province.

== Description ==
In Alajuela province the route covers Alajuela canton (Alajuela, Río Segundo districts).
