= Guácima =

District in Alajuela canton, Alajuela province, Costa Rica

- District
- Interactive map of Guácima
- Guácima district location in Costa Rica
- Coordinates: 9.9612881°N 84.2587522°W
- Country: Costa Rica
- Province: Alajuela
- Canton: Alajuela

Area
  - Total: 28.04 km^{2} (10.83 sq mi)
- Elevation: 807 m (2,648 ft)

Population (2011)
  - Total: 20,183
  - Density: 719.8/km^{2} (1,864/sq mi)
- Time zone: UTC−06:00
- Postal code: 20105

Guácima is a district of the Alajuela canton, in the Alajuela province of Costa Rica.

== Geography ==
Guácima has an area of 28.04 km^{2} and an elevation of 807 metres.

== Demographics ==
Historical population
| Census | Pop. | ±% p.a. |
|---|---|---|
| 1883 | 353 | — |
| 1892 | 990 | +12.14% |
| 1927 | 1,690 | +1.54% |
| 1950 | 2,555 | +1.81% |
| 1963 | 3,478 | +2.40% |
| 1973 | 4,265 | +2.06% |
| 1984 | 5,740 | +2.74% |
| 2000 | 15,450 | +6.38% |
| 2011 | 20,183 | +2.46% |
| 2022 | 30,361 | +3.78% |
Source: Instituto Nacional de Estadística y Censos; Centro Centroamericano de Población

For the 2011 census, Guácima had a population of 20,183 inhabitants.

== Transportation ==
=== Road transportation ===
The district is covered by the following road routes:

- National Route 1
- National Route 27
- National Route 122
- National Route 124

=== Rail transportation ===
The Interurbano Line operated by Incofer goes through this district, however this section is abandoned.
