= San José de Alajuela =

District in Alajuela canton, Alajuela province, Costa Rica

San José
- District
- San José district
- San José district location in Costa Rica
- Coordinates: 10.0043224°N 84.244244°W
- Country: Costa Rica
- Province: Alajuela
- Canton: Alajuela

Area
  - Total: 14.69 km^{2} (5.67 sq mi)
- Elevation: 882 m (2,894 ft)

Population (2011)
  - Total: 41,656
  - Density: 2,836/km^{2} (7,344/sq mi)
- Time zone: UTC−06:00
- Postal code: 20102

San José is a district of the Alajuela canton, in the Alajuela province of Costa Rica.

== Geography ==
San José has an area of 14.69 km^{2} (5.67 sq mi) and an elevation of 882 metres (2,894 ft).

== Demographics ==
Historical population
Census	Pop.	±% p.a.
1864	1,818	—
1883	1,265	−1.89%
1892	1,539	+2.20%
1927	1,457	−0.16%
1950	2,096	+1.59%
1963	4,866	+6.69%
1973	9,523	+6.94%
1984	17,916	+5.91%
2000	35,405	+4.35%
2011	41,656	+1.49%
2022	48,510	+1.39%
Source: Instituto Nacional de Estadística y Censos; Centro Centroamericano de Población

For the 2011 census, San José had a population of 41,656 inhabitants.

== Transportation ==
=== Road transportation ===
The district is covered by the following road routes:

- National Route 1
- National Route 3
- National Route 118
- National Route 727

=== Rail transportation ===
The Interurbano Line operated by Incofer goes through this district.
