= Turrúcares =

District in Alajuela canton, Alajuela province, Costa Rica

- District
- Turrúcares district
- Turrúcares district location in Costa Rica
- Coordinates: 9.9420766°N 84.3229688°W
- Country: Costa Rica
- Province: Alajuela
- Canton: Alajuela

Area
  - Total: 35.99 km^{2} (13.90 sq mi)
- Elevation: 638 m (2,093 ft)

Population (2011)
  - Total: 7,630
  - Density: 212/km^{2} (549/sq mi)
- Time zone: UTC−06:00
- Postal code: 20111

Turrúcares is a district of the Alajuela canton, in the Alajuela province of Costa Rica.

== Geography ==
Turrúcares has an area of 35.99 km^{2} and an elevation of 638 metres.

== Demographics ==
Historical population
Census	Pop.	±% p.a.
1883	835	—
1892	808	−0.36%
1927	1,586	+1.95%
1950	1,873	+0.73%
1963	2,377	+1.85%
1973	2,699	+1.28%
1984	3,340	+1.96%
2000	5,986	+3.71%
2011	7,630	+2.23%
2022	9,576	+2.09%
Source: Instituto Nacional de Estadística y Censos; Centro Centroamericano de Población

For the 2011 census, Turrúcares had a population of 7,630 inhabitants.

== Transportation ==
=== Road transportation ===
The district is covered by the following road routes:

- National Route 27
- National Route 136
- National Route 721
