= Río Segundo District =

District in Alajuela canton, Alajuela province, Costa Rica

Río Segundo
- District
- Río Segundo district
- Río Segundo district location in Costa Rica
- Coordinates: 10.0012951°N 84.1937233°W
- Country: Costa Rica
- Province: Alajuela
- Canton: Alajuela

Area
  - Total: 5.57 km^{2} (2.15 sq mi)
- Elevation: 930 m (3,050 ft)

Population (2011)
  - Total: 10,794
  - Density: 1,940/km^{2} (5,020/sq mi)
- Time zone: UTC−06:00
- Postal code: 20109

Río Segundo is a district of the Alajuela canton, in the Alajuela province of Costa Rica.

== Geography ==
Río Segundo has an area of 5.57 km^{2} and an elevation of 930 metres.

== Demographics ==
Historical population
Census	Pop.	±% p.a.
1883	893	—
1892	1,066	+1.99%
1927	1,432	+0.85%
1950	1,613	+0.52%
1963	2,156	+2.26%
1973	4,424	+7.45%
1984	8,144	+5.70%
2000	11,036	+1.92%
2011	10,794	−0.20%
2022	12,812	+1.57%
Source: Instituto Nacional de Estadística y Censos; Centro Centroamericano de Población

For the 2011 census, Río Segundo had a population of 10,794 inhabitants.

== Transportation ==
=== Road transportation ===
The district is covered by the following road routes:

- National Route 1
- National Route 3
- National Route 111
- National Route 119
- National Route 153

=== Rail transportation ===
The Interurbano Line operated by Incofer goes through this district.
