= National Route 111 (Costa Rica) =

National Road Route in Costa Rica

National Secondary Route 111
- Ruta nacional secundaria 111

Route information
- Maintained by Ministry of Public Works and Transport
- Length: 11.805 km (7.335 mi)

Location
- Country: Costa Rica
- Provinces: Alajuela, Heredia

Highway system
- National Road Network of Costa Rica
← Route 110	→ Route 112

National Secondary Route 111, or just Route 111 (Spanish: Ruta Nacional Secundaria 111, or Ruta 111) is a National Road Route of Costa Rica, located in the Alajuela, Heredia provinces.

== Description ==
In Alajuela province the route covers Alajuela canton (Río Segundo district).

In Heredia province the route covers Heredia canton (Mercedes, San Francisco, Ulloa districts) and Belén canton (San Antonio, La Ribera, La Asunción districts).
