= National Route 3 (Costa Rica) =

National Road Route in Costa Rica

National Primary Route 3
- Ruta nacional primaria 3

Route information
- Maintained by Ministry of Public Works and Transport
- Length: 67.265 km (41.797 mi)

Location
- Country: Costa Rica
- Provinces: San José, Alajuela, Heredia

Highway system
- National Road Network of Costa Rica
← Route 2	→ Route 4

National Primary Route 3, or just Route 3 (Spanish: Ruta Nacional Primaria 3, or Ruta 3) is a National Road Route of Costa Rica located in the San José, Alajuela, and Heredia provinces.

== Description ==
In San José province the route covers San José canton (Uruca district).

In Alajuela province the route covers Alajuela canton (Alajuela, San José, Río Segundo, Desamparados, and Garita districts), San Mateo canton (San Mateo and Desmonte districts), Atenas canton (Atenas, Jesús, and Concepción districts), and Orotina canton (Orotina district).

In Heredia province the route covers Heredia canton (Heredia, Mercedes, San Francisco, and Ulloa districts), Belén canton (La Ribera district), and Flores canton (Llorente district).
