= Alajuela (canton) =

Canton in Alajuela province, Costa Rica

- Canton
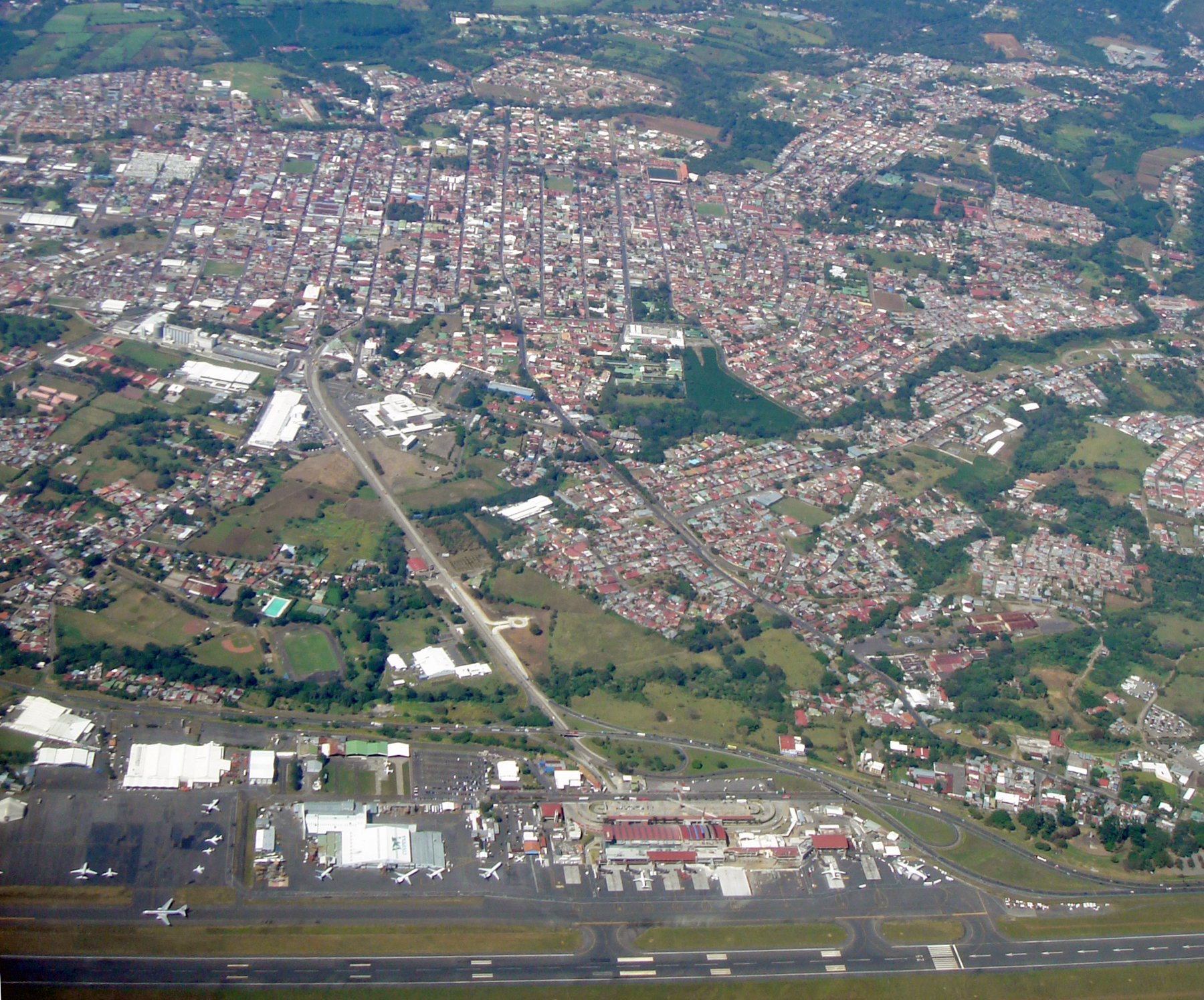
- Alajuela urban area

- Flag Seal
- Interactive map of Alajuela
- Alajuela canton location in Alajuela Province Alajuela canton location in Costa Rica
- Coordinates: 10.163979°N 84.2645463°W
- Country: Costa Rica
- Province: Alajuela
- Creation: 7 December 1848
- Head city: Alajuela
- Districts: Districts: Alajuela; San José; Carrizal; San Antonio; Guácima; San Isidro; Sabanilla; San Rafael; Río Segundo; Desamparados; Turrúcares; Tambor; Garita; Sarapiquí

Government
  - Type: Municipality
  - Body: Municipalidad de Alajuela
  - Mayor: Roberto Hernán Thompson Chacón (PLN)

Area
  - Total: 391.62 km^{2} (151.21 sq mi)
- Elevation: 942 m (3,091 ft)

Population (2011)
  - Total: 254,886
  - Estimate (2022): 322,143
  - Density: 650.85/km^{2} (1,685.7/sq mi)
- Time zone: UTC−06:00
- Canton code: 201
- Website: www.munialajuela.go.cr

Alajuela is a canton in the Alajuela province of Costa Rica. Its head city is the provincial capital city of Alajuela.

== History ==
Alajuela was created on 7 December 1848 by decree 167.

== Geography ==
Alajuela has an area of 391.62 km^{2} (151.21 sq mi) and a mean elevation of 942 m (3,091 ft).

Northward from the city of Alajuela, the canton continues along the border with the province of Heredia to its east, encompassing a strip of the Cordillera Central (Central Mountain Range) between Poas Volcano and Barva Volcano. On the Caribbean side of the mountains, the canton takes in a portion of the Sarapiquí area. The Río Poás (Poas River) forms the major portion of the canton's western border, finally giving way to the Río Poasito as the territory ascends into the Cordillera Central.

Southwest of the city of Alajuela, the canton of Alajuela ends at the confluence of the Río Grande (Great River) and the Río Virilla (Virilla River).

== Government ==
=== Mayor ===
According to Costa Rica's Municipal Code, mayors are elected every four years by the population of the canton. As of the latest municipal elections in 2024, the National Liberation Party candidate, Roberto Hernán Thompson Chacón, was elected mayor of the canton with 22.73% of the votes, with Sofía Marcela González Barquero and Elías Mateo Chaves Hernández as first and second vice mayors, respectively.

Mayors of Alajuela since the 2002 elections
Period	Name	Party
2002–2006	Fabio Molina Rojas	PLN
2006–2010	Joyce Mary Zurcher Blen	PLN
2010–2016	Roberto Hernán Thompson Chacón	PLN
2016–2020	Roberto Hernán Thompson Chacón	PLN
2020–2024	Humberto Soto Herrera	PLN
2024–2028	Roberto Hernán Thompson Chacón	PLN

=== Municipal Council ===
Like the mayor and vice mayors, members of the Municipal Council (called regidores) are elected every four years. Alajuela's Municipal Council has 11 seats for regidores and their substitutes, who can participate in meetings but not vote unless the owning regidor (regidor propietario) is absent. The current president of the Municipal Council is the Let's Renovate Alajuela Party member, Francisco Javier Sánchez Gómez, with National Liberation Party member, Mercedes Gutiérrez Carvajal, as vice president. The Municipal Council's composition for the 2024–2028 period is as follows:

Current composition of the Municipal Council of Alajuela after the 2024 municipal elections
Political parties in the Municipal Council of Alajuela
Political party	Regidores		
Political party	No.	Owner	Substitute
National Liberation Party (PLN)	3	Marvin Venegas Melendéz	Luis Emilio Hernández León
National Liberation Party (PLN)	3	Mercedes Gutiérrez Carvajal^{(VP)}	Argerie María Córdoba Rodríguez
National Liberation Party (PLN)	3	Eder Francisco Hernández Ulloa	Luis Porfirio Campos Porras
Social Christian Unity Party (PUSC)	2	Jorge Arturo Campos Araya	Marvin Alberto Mora Bolaños
Social Christian Unity Party (PUSC)	2	Kathia Marcela Guzmán Cerdas	María Fernanda Marten Rodríguez
Let's Renovate Alajuela Party (PRA)	1	Francisco Javier Sánchez Gómez^{(P)} (Note: Also legally named Francisco Javier Sánchez Cabezas.)	Ananias Fuentes Navarro
Social Democratic Progress Party (PSD)	1	Sergio Murillo Picado	Eduardo Naranjo Muñoz
Our Town Party (PNP)	1	Germán Vinicio Aguilar Solano	Humberto Soto Herrera
Costa Rica Rules Here (ACRM)	1	Bernal Alonso Soto Saborío	Osvaldo Alpizar Núñez
Alajuela's Awakening (DA)	1	Ana Patricia Guillén Campos	Marlene Garita Santamaría
Progressive Liberal Party (PLP)	1	Yadu Graciela Fuentes Araya	Katia Vanessa Arroyo Vargas

== Landmarks ==
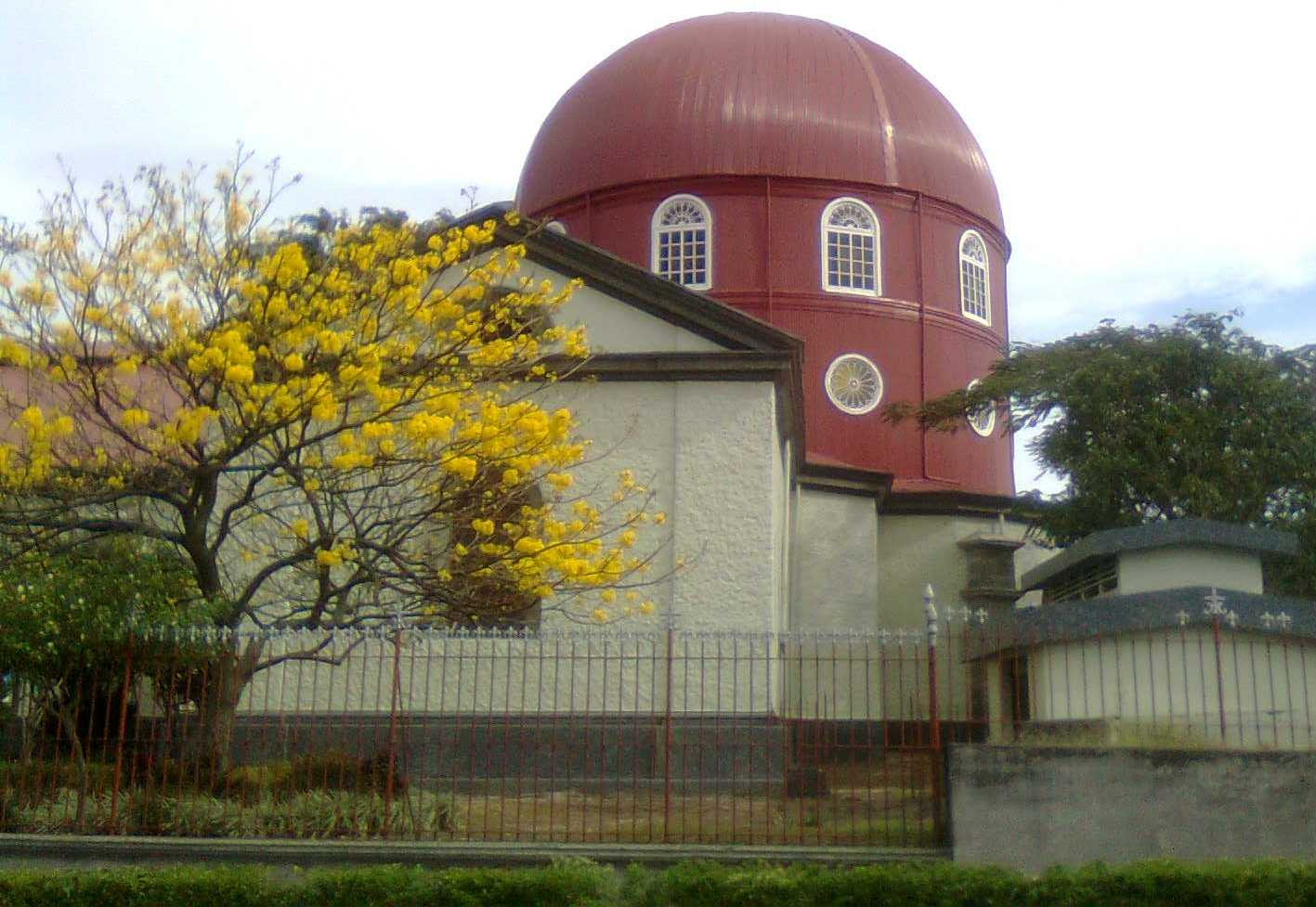
Alajuela Cathedral dome

In the center of Alajuela, next to Parque de Alajuela, also known as "Parque de los Mangos", is Alajuela Cathedral, whose main feature is its red dome. This park is a popular place for locals to socialize, especially in the afternoons. One block west of the park is the Mercado Central de Alajuela, a bustling shopping centre. Poás Volcano National Park is about 37 kilometres (23 mi) north of Alajuela city and is known for its five waterfalls at La Paz Waterfall Gardens.

To the north of the Central Park is the Museo Histórico Cultural Juan Santamaría. This museum, situated in a building built in 1894–45, which was formerly a prison in the barracks of Alajuela, contains many historical maps, artifacts and portraits of the 1856-1857 campaign. In 1977 it became the headquarters of the Centro de Investigación para el Perfeccionamiento Técnico (CIPET), an institution of the Ministry of Public Education.

== Districts ==
The canton of Alajuela is subdivided into the following districts:

1. Alajuela
2. San José
3. Carrizal
4. San Antonio
5. Guácima
6. San Isidro
7. Sabanilla
8. San Rafael
9. Río Segundo
10. Desamparados
11. Turrúcares
12. Tambor
13. Garita
14. Sarapiquí

== Demographics ==
Historical population
Census	Pop.	±% p.a.
1864	11,521	—
1883	15,247	+1.49%
1892	19,300	+2.65%
1927	25,656	+0.82%
1950	37,376	+1.65%
1963	64,398	+4.27%
1973	96,325	+4.11%
1984	127,472	+2.58%
2000	222,853	+3.55%
2011	254,886	+1.23%
2022	322,143	+2.15%
Source: Instituto Nacional de Estadística y Censos; Centro Centroamericano de Población

Alajuela was estimated to have 322,143 inhabitants in 2022, an increase from its 254,886 at the time of the 2011 census.

Alajuela had a Human Development Index of 0.784 in 2022, the highest score in its province and 19th among all cantons in Costa Rica.

== Transportation ==
=== Road transportation ===
The canton is covered by the following road routes:

- National Route 1
- National Route 3
- National Route 27
- National Route 107
- National Route 111
- National Route 118
- National Route 119
- National Route 120
- National Route 122
- National Route 123
- National Route 124
- National Route 125
- National Route 126
- National Route 130
- National Route 136
- National Route 140
- National Route 146
- National Route 147
- National Route 153
- National Route 712
- National Route 718
- National Route 719
- National Route 721
- National Route 727

=== Rail transportation ===
The Interurbano Line operated by Incofer goes through this canton.

== Economy ==
It is a major area for the production of coffee, strawberries and ornamental plants. The Doka Estate lies within the canton, in Sabanilla District, and is a major coffee producing estate, supplying directly to Starbucks.
