= Sara Cognuck =

Costa Rican environmentalist

- Born: Peñas Blancas District, Costa Rica
- Citizenship: Costa Rican
- Education: University of Costa Rica
- Occupation: Climate activist
- Known for: Youth climate activism; coordination of Local Conference of Youth (LCOY) preceding COP 25

Sara Cognuck is a climate activist from Costa Rica.

== Early life and education ==
In her early life, Cognuck lived in Peñas Blancas. She currently lives in Esparza. She is a graduate of University of Costa Rica.

== Activism ==
She started her activism when she was 15 years old. One of her projects started around 2015 or 2016 when she joined National Council of Young Persons of Costa Rica, which was part of the movement to include climate action in the Public Policy of the Young Person 2020–2024.

At the age of 24, Cognuck was also a coordinator of Local Conference of Youth (LCOY), which was an event preceding COP 25, and a member of the Youth Constituency at the United Nations Framework Convention on Climate Change joined by 70 young people in 2019. She is also a youth representative for Declaration on Children, Youth and Climate Action.
