= San Lorenzo District, San Ramón =

District in San Ramón canton, Alajuela province, Costa Rica

San Lorenzo
- District
- San Lorenzo district
- San Lorenzo district location in Costa Rica
- Coordinates: 10.2719255°N 84.6376928°W
- Country: Costa Rica
- Province: Alajuela
- Canton: San Ramón
- Creation: 30 August 2016

Area
  - Total: 309.15 km^{2} (119.36 sq mi)
- Elevation: 200 m (660 ft)
- Time zone: UTC−06:00
- Postal code: 20214

San Lorenzo is a district of the San Ramón canton, in the Alajuela province of Costa Rica.

== History ==
San Lorenzo was created on 30 August 2016 by Acuerdo Ejecutivo N° 026-2016-MGP.

== Geography ==
San Lorenzo has an area of 309.15 km^{2} and an elevation of 200 metres.

== Locations ==
Head village is Valle Azul. The district encompasses the Bajo Córdoba, Bajo Rodríguez, Cataratas, Colonia Palmareña, Coopezamora, Criques, Kooper, Los Lagos, Las Rocas and San Jorge hamlets.

== Demographics ==
Historical population
Census	Pop.	±% p.a.
2022	4,643	—
Source: Instituto Nacional de Estadística y Censos; Centro Centroamericano de Población

For the 2011 census, San Lorenzo had not been created, therefore no census data is available.

== Transportation ==
=== Road transportation ===
The district is covered by the following road routes:

- National Route 702
- National Route 739
