= National Route 742 (Costa Rica) =

National Road Route in Costa Rica

National Tertiary Route 742
- Ruta nacional terciaria 742

Route information
- Maintained by Ministry of Public Works and Transport
- Length: 51.770 km (32.168 mi)

Location
- Country: Costa Rica
- Provinces: Alajuela, Puntarenas

Highway system
- National Road Network of Costa Rica
← Route 741	→ Route 744

National Tertiary Route 742, or just Route 742 (Spanish: Ruta Nacional Terciaria 742, or Ruta 742) is a National Road Route of Costa Rica, located in the Alajuela, Puntarenas provinces.

== Description ==
In Alajuela province the route covers San Ramón canton (San Ramón, Piedades Norte, Piedades Sur, Alfaro, Zapotal districts).

In Puntarenas province the route covers Esparza canton (Macacona, San Jerónimo districts).
