= Labrador (disambiguation) =

Labrador is the mainland part of the province of Newfoundland and Labrador, Canada.

Labrador may also refer to:

== Geography ==
- Labrador (electoral district), a Canadian federal electoral district
- Labrador Peninsula, a peninsula in Canada shared between Quebec and Newfoundland and Labrador
- Labrador Sea, an arm of the North Atlantic Ocean between Canada and Greenland
- Labrador District, San Mateo, a district in the Costa Rican province of Alajuela

=== Towns ===
- Labrador, Queensland, Australia
- Labrador, Pangasinan, Philippines
- Labrador City, Newfoundland and Labrador, Canada

=== Areas ===
- Labrador Hollow Unique Area, New York, United States
- Labrador Nature Reserve, Singapore

== People ==
- Basilio Labrador (born 1967), Spanish racewalker
- João Fernandes Lavrador (1453–ca. 1501), Portuguese explorer
- Juan Fernández el Labrador (fl. 1629–1636), Spanish painter
- Pedro Gómez Labrador (1755–1852), Spanish diplomat
- Raúl Labrador (born 1967), American politician
- Rodolfo Labrador (born 1992), Filipino volleyball player

== Vehicles ==
- CCGS Labrador (formerly HMCS Labrador (AW 50), Canadian icebreaker in service from 1954 to 1987
- CH-113 Labrador, helicopter used by Canadian Forces Air Command
- Labrador (HBC vessel), operated by the Hudson's Bay Company from 1866–1887, see Hudson's Bay Company vessels

== Plants and animals ==
- Labrador duck, extinct North American bird
- Labrador Retriever, breed of dog
- Labrador tea, a common name for three species of plants

== Other uses ==
- Labrador Current, cold current in the Atlantic ocean
- Labrador ice sheet, a major ice sheet that periodically covered parts of North America
- Labrador Records, alternative record label from Stockholm, Sweden
- "Labrador", a song by American singer-songwriter Aimee Mann
