= Jesús María District, San Mateo =

District in San Mateo canton, Alajuela province, Costa Rica

Jesús María
- District
- Interactive map of Jesús María
- Jesús María district location in Costa Rica
- Coordinates: 9.9583055°N 84.5831937°W
- Country: Costa Rica
- Province: Alajuela
- Canton: San Mateo
- Creation: 31 July 1966

Area
  - Total: 18.79 km^{2} (7.25 sq mi)
- Elevation: 243 m (797 ft)

Population (2011)
  - Total: 2,397
  - Density: 127.6/km^{2} (330.4/sq mi)
- Time zone: UTC−06:00
- Postal code: 20403

Jesús María is a district of the San Mateo canton, in the Alajuela province of Costa Rica.

== History ==
Jesús María was created on 31 July 1966 by Ley 3722. Segregated from San Mateo.

== Geography ==
Jesús María has an area of 18.79 km^{2} and an elevation of 243 metres.

== Demographics ==
Historical population
Census	Pop.	±% p.a.
1883	252	—
1892	271	+0.81%
1973	961	+1.58%
1984	1,144	+1.60%
2000	1,943	+3.37%
2011	2,397	+1.93%
2022	1,487	−4.25%
Source: Instituto Nacional de Estadística y Censos; Centro Centroamericano de Población

For the 2011 census, Jesús María had a population of 2,397 inhabitants.

== Transportation ==
=== Road transportation ===
The district is covered by the following road routes:

- National Route 131
