= National Route 705 (Costa Rica) =

National Road Route in Costa Rica

National Tertiary Route 705
- Ruta nacional terciaria 705

Route information
- Maintained by Ministry of Public Works and Transport
- Length: 13.665 km (8.491 mi)

Location
- Country: Costa Rica
- Provinces: Alajuela

Highway system
- National Road Network of Costa Rica
← Route 704	→ Route 706

National Tertiary Route 705, or just Route 705 (Spanish: Ruta Nacional Terciaria 705, or Ruta 705) is a National Road Route of Costa Rica, located in the Alajuela province.

== Description ==
In Alajuela province the route covers San Ramón canton (San Ramón, Piedades Norte, and Alfaro districts).
