= National Route 703 (Costa Rica) =

National Road Route in Costa Rica

National Tertiary Route 703
- Ruta nacional terciaria 703

Route information
- Maintained by Ministry of Public Works and Transport
- Length: 19.010 km (11.812 mi)

Location
- Country: Costa Rica
- Provinces: Alajuela

Highway system
- National Road Network of Costa Rica
| ← Route 702 | → Route 704 |

National Tertiary Route 703, or just Route 703 (Spanish: Ruta Nacional Terciaria 703, or Ruta 703) is a National Road Route of Costa Rica, located in the Alajuela province.

== Description ==
In Alajuela province the route covers San Ramón canton (San Ramón, San Juan, San Rafael, and Volio districts) and Naranjo canton (San José and Cirrí Sur districts).
