= Peperomia venabulifolia =

Scientific classification
- Kingdom: Plantae
- Clade: Tracheophytes
- Clade: Angiosperms
- Clade: Magnoliids
- Order: Piperales
- Family: Piperaceae
- Genus: Peperomia
- Species: P. venabulifolia

Binomial name
- Peperomia venabulifolia Trel.

Species of epiphyte

Peperomia venabulifolia is a species of perennial or herb from the genus Peperomia. It was discovered by William Trelease in 1940.

== Distribution ==
Peperomia venabulifolia is native to Costa Rica and Panama. Specimens can be found around 12.5-1200 meters.

- Costa Rica
  - Limón
    - Bratsi
  - Guanacaste
    - Tronadora
  - Alajuela
    - Angeles
  - San José
- Panama
  - Chiriquí
  - Bocas del Toro
  - Veraguas

== Description ==
It is a moderate-sized erect glabrous herb that grows on trees. Leaves alternate, it has narrow leaves attached to the pointed end while the other end is rounded, long-pointed, wedge-shaped, and attached to the base. They are up to 16 centimeters.

== Subtaxa ==
These subtaxa are accepted.

Peperomia venabulifolia var. amplectens Trel.
