= National Route 156 (Costa Rica) =

National Road Route in Costa Rica

National Secondary Route 156
- Ruta nacional secundaria 156

Route information
- Maintained by Ministry of Public Works and Transport
- Length: 0.635 km (0.395 mi; 2,080 ft)

Location
- Country: Costa Rica
- Provinces: Alajuela

Highway system
- National Road Network of Costa Rica
← Route 155	→ Route 157

National Secondary Route 156, or just Route 156 (Spanish: Ruta Nacional Secundaria 156, or Ruta 156) is a National Road Route of Costa Rica located in the Alajuela province.

== Description ==
In Alajuela province the route covers San Ramón canton (San Rafael district).
