= Volio District =

District in San Ramón canton, Alajuela province, Costa Rica

Volio
- District
- Volio district
- Volio district location in Costa Rica
- Coordinates: 10.1516759°N 84.4498315°W
- Country: Costa Rica
- Province: Alajuela
- Canton: San Ramón

Area
  - Total: 20.46 km^{2} (7.90 sq mi)
- Elevation: 1,160 m (3,810 ft)

Population (2011)
  - Total: 2,270
  - Density: 111/km^{2} (287/sq mi)
- Time zone: UTC−06:00
- Postal code: 20210

Volio is a district of the San Ramón canton, in the Alajuela province of Costa Rica.

== Geography ==
Volio has an area of 20.46 km^{2} and an elevation of 1,160 metres.

== Demographics ==
Historical population
Census	Pop.	±% p.a.
1927	698	—
1950	815	+0.68%
1963	798	−0.16%
1973	777	−0.27%
1984	1,062	+2.88%
2000	1,669	+2.87%
2011	2,270	+2.84%
2022	3,739	+4.64%
Source: Instituto Nacional de Estadística y Censos; Centro Centroamericano de Población

For the 2011 census, Volio had a population of 2,270 inhabitants.

== Transportation ==
=== Road transportation ===
The district is covered by the following road routes:

- National Route 703
