= National Route 131 (Costa Rica) =

National Road Route in Costa Rica

National Secondary Route 131
- Ruta nacional secundaria 131

Route information
- Maintained by Ministry of Public Works and Transport
- Length: 20.120 km (12.502 mi)

Location
- Country: Costa Rica
- Provinces: Alajuela, Puntarenas

Highway system
- National Road Network of Costa Rica
← Route 130	→ Route 132

National Secondary Route 131, or just Route 131 (Spanish: Ruta Nacional Secundaria 131, or Ruta 131) is a National Road Route of Costa Rica located in the Alajuela and Puntarenas provinces.

== Description ==
In Alajuela province the route covers San Mateo canton (San Mateo, Jesús María, and Labrador districts).

In Puntarenas province the route covers Esparza canton (Espíritu Santo, San Juan Grande, Macacona, and San Rafael districts).
