= Piedades Norte =

District in San Ramón canton, Alajuela province, Costa Rica

- District
- Piedades Norte district
- Piedades Norte district location in Costa Rica
- Coordinates: 10.1396322°N 84.5364661°W
- Country: Costa Rica
- Province: Alajuela
- Canton: San Ramón

Area
  - Total: 47.2 km^{2} (18.2 sq mi)
- Elevation: 1,130 m (3,710 ft)

Population (2011)
  - Total: 8,147
  - Density: 173/km^{2} (447/sq mi)
- Time zone: UTC−06:00
- Postal code: 20204

Piedades Norte is a district of the San Ramón canton, in the Alajuela province of Costa Rica.

== Geography ==
Piedades Norte has an area of 47.2 km^{2} and an elevation of 1,130 metres.

== Demographics ==
Historical population
Census	Pop.	±% p.a.
1883	736	—
1892	988	+3.33%
1927	875	−0.35%
1950	1,479	+2.31%
1963	2,324	+3.54%
1973	2,338	+0.06%
1984	2,373	+0.14%
2000	6,846	+6.85%
2011	8,147	+1.59%
2022	6,491	−2.04%
Source: Instituto Nacional de Estadística y Censos; Centro Centroamericano de Población

For the 2011 census, Piedades Norte had a population of 8,147 inhabitants.

== Transportation ==
=== Road transportation ===
The district is covered by the following road routes:

- National Route 702
- National Route 705
- National Route 742
