= Alfaro District =

District in San Ramón canton, Alajuela province, Costa Rica

Alfaro
- District
- Interactive map of Alfaro
- Alfaro district location in Costa Rica
- Coordinates: 10.0893199°N 84.5026565°W
- Country: Costa Rica
- Province: Alajuela
- Canton: San Ramón

Area
  - Total: 17.87 km^{2} (6.90 sq mi)
- Elevation: 1,120 m (3,670 ft)

Population (2011)
  - Total: 7,137
  - Density: 399.4/km^{2} (1,034/sq mi)
- Time zone: UTC−06:00
- Postal code: 20209

Alfaro is a district of the San Ramón canton, in the Alajuela province of Costa Rica.

== Geography ==
Alfaro has an area of 17.87 km^{2} and an elevation of 1,120 metres.

== Demographics ==
Historical population
Census	Pop.	±% p.a.
1927	639	—
1950	860	+1.30%
1963	1,102	+1.93%
1973	1,348	+2.04%
1984	2,030	+3.79%
2000	4,741	+5.44%
2011	7,137	+3.79%
2022	8,512	+1.61%
Source: Instituto Nacional de Estadística y Censos; Centro Centroamericano de Población

For the 2011 census, Alfaro had a population of 7,137 inhabitants.

== Transportation ==
=== Road transportation ===
The district is covered by the following road routes:

- National Route 705
- National Route 742
