= Districts of Costa Rica =

Administrative division of Costa Rica

Colored map of Cantons of Costa Rica, with district borders visible in each canton.

According to the Territorial Administrative Division, the cantons of Costa Rica are subdivided into 492 districts (distritos), each of which has a unique five-digit postal code.

== Government organization ==
Each canton is divided into districts whose number varies from canton to canton. Each district has a District Council chaired by a syndic, all popularly elected. The District Council is the interlocutor between the district and the municipal government and ensures the communal and neighborhood interests before the Municipal Council;. However, the direct administration of the district falls to the municipality; the District Councils also exercise administrative functions such as forwarding projects to the Council and supervising the mayor's work.

=== District Municipal Council ===
There are seven District Municipal Councils (Concejo Municipal de Distrito) in districts that are geographically distant from the head city of the canton where the municipality is located; these councils are in charge of municipal administrative activities.

- Peñas Blancas, in San Ramón canton.
- Tucurrique, in Jiménez canton.
- Cervantes, in Alvarado canton.
- Colorado, in Abangares canton.
- Lepanto, in Puntarenas canton.
- Paquera, in Puntarenas canton.
- Cóbano, in Puntarenas canton.

== Postal codes ==
Postal codes in Costa Rica are five-digit numeric, and were introduced in March 2007; they are associated with and identify a unique district. The first digit denotes one of the seven provinces, the 2nd and 3rd refer to the 82 cantons (unique within the province), the 4th and 5th the 488 districts (unique within the canton). The numbers are the same as used by the Instituto Nacional de Estadística y Censos (INEC).

== Complete District List ==
Districts of Costa Rica
| Province | Canton | District | Postal Code | Population (2011) | Population (2000) | Change | Land area (km^{2}) | Population density |
|---|---|---|---|---|---|---|---|---|
| San José | San José | Carmen | 10101 | 2,702 | 3,360 | −19.6% | 1.47 | 1,838.1/km^{2} |
| San José | San José | Merced | 10102 | 12,257 | 13,565 | −9.6% | 2.17 | 5,648.4/km^{2} |
| San José | San José | Hospital | 10103 | 19,270 | 24,175 | −20.3% | 3.3 | 5,839.4/km^{2} |
| San José | San José | Catedral | 10104 | 12,936 | 15,341 | −15.7% | 2.35 | 5,504.7/km^{2} |
| San José | San José | Zapote | 10105 | 18,679 | 20,753 | −10.0% | 2.87 | 6,508.4/km^{2} |
| San José | San José | San Francisco de Dos Ríos | 10106 | 20,209 | 21,724 | −7.0% | 2.64 | 7,654.9/km^{2} |
| San José | San José | Uruca | 10107 | 31,728 | 27,110 | +17.0% | 8.44 | 3,759.2/km^{2} |
| San José | San José | Mata Redonda | 10108 | 8,313 | 9,321 | −10.8% | 3.69 | 2,252.8/km^{2} |
| San José | San José | Pavas | 10109 | 71,384 | 76,177 | −6.3% | 9.39 | 7,602.1/km^{2} |
| San José | San José | Hatillo | 10110 | 50,511 | 54,901 | −8.0% | 4.38 | 11,532.2/km^{2} |
| San José | San José | San Sebastián | 10111 | 40,065 | 43,245 | −7.4% | 4.01 | 9,991.3/km^{2} |
| San José | Escazú | Escazú | 10201 | 11,984 | 12,379 | −3.2% | 4.56 | 2,628.1/km^{2} |
| San José | Escazú | San Antonio | 10202 | 22,554 | 20,795 | +8.5% | 17.01 | 1,325.9/km^{2} |
| San José | Escazú | San Rafael | 10203 | 21,971 | 19,198 | +14.4% | 12.96 | 1,695.3/km^{2} |
| San José | Desamparados | Desamparados | 10301 | 33,866 | 36,437 | −7.1% | 3.31 | 10,231.4/km^{2} |
| San José | Desamparados | San Miguel | 10302 | 31,805 | 28,336 | +12.2% | 21.36 | 1,489.0/km^{2} |
| San José | Desamparados | San Juan de Dios | 10303 | 19,481 | 16,577 | +17.5% | 2.98 | 6,537.2/km^{2} |
| San José | Desamparados | San Rafael Arriba | 10304 | 15,262 | 13,008 | +17.3% | 3.21 | 4,754.5/km^{2} |
| San José | Desamparados | San Antonio | 10305 | 9,727 | 9,775 | −0.5% | 2.1 | 4,631.9/km^{2} |
| San José | Desamparados | Frailes | 10306 | 3,772 | 3,504 | +7.6% | 19.57 | 192.7/km^{2} |
| San José | Desamparados | Patarrá | 10307 | 11,921 | 28,451 | −58.1% | 16.09 | 740.9/km^{2} |
| San José | Desamparados | San Cristóbal | 10308 | 3,905 | 3,360 | +16.2% | 25.47 | 153.3/km^{2} |
| San José | Desamparados | Rosario | 10309 | 3,088 | 2,710 | +13.9% | 14.77 | 209.1/km^{2} |
| San José | Desamparados | Damas | 10310 | 13,175 | 12,993 | +1.4% | 2.57 | 5,126.5/km^{2} |
| San José | Desamparados | San Rafael Abajo | 10311 | 23,283 | 22,481 | +3.6% | 2.01 | 11,583.6/km^{2} |
| San José | Desamparados | Gravilias | 10312 | 15,024 | 15,846 | −5.2% | 2.94 | 5,110.2/km^{2} |
| San José | Desamparados | Los Guido | 10313 | 24,102 | 24,102 | 0.0% | 3.01 | 8,007.3/km^{2} |
| San José | Puriscal | Santiago | 10401 | 11,512 | 10,884 | +5.8% | 34.52 | 333.5/km^{2} |
| San José | Puriscal | Mercedes Sur | 10402 | 5,866 | 5,082 | +15.4% | 183.58 | 32.0/km^{2} |
| San José | Puriscal | Barbacoas | 10403 | 3,692 | 3,210 | +15.0% | 18.74 | 197.0/km^{2} |
| San José | Puriscal | Grifo Alto | 10404 | 1,182 | 1,101 | +7.4% | 26.21 | 45.1/km^{2} |
| San José | Puriscal | San Rafael | 10405 | 1,730 | 1,524 | +13.5% | 15.53 | 111.4/km^{2} |
| San José | Puriscal | Candelarita | 10406 | 1,436 | 1,425 | +0.8% | 24.87 | 57.7/km^{2} |
| San José | Puriscal | Desamparaditos | 10407 | 666 | 572 | +16.4% | 7.14 | 93.3/km^{2} |
| San José | Puriscal | San Antonio | 10408 | 3,889 | 2,803 | +38.7% | 14.5 | 268.2/km^{2} |
| San José | Puriscal | Chires | 10409 | 3,031 | 2,806 | +8.0% | 230.47 | 13.2/km^{2} |
| San José | Tarrazú | San Marcos | 10501 | 9,993 | 8,240 | +21.3% | 45.53 | 219.5/km^{2} |
| San José | Tarrazú | San Lorenzo | 10502 | 4,394 | 4,029 | +9.1% | 185.64 | 23.7/km^{2} |
| San José | Tarrazú | San Carlos | 10503 | 1,893 | 1,891 | +0.1% | 58.58 | 32.3/km^{2} |
| San José | Aserrí | Aserrí | 10601 | 28,191 | 23,844 | +18.2% | 15.25 | 1,848.6/km^{2} |
| San José | Aserrí | Tarbaca | 10602 | 1,446 | 1,231 | +17.5% | 15.33 | 94.3/km^{2} |
| San José | Aserrí | Vuelta de Jorco | 10603 | 6,499 | 6,155 | +5.6% | 22.04 | 294.9/km^{2} |
| San José | Aserrí | San Gabriel | 10604 | 6,061 | 5,048 | +20.1% | 11.76 | 515.4/km^{2} |
| San José | Aserrí | Legua | 10605 | 1,521 | 1,472 | +3.3% | 81.51 | 18.7/km^{2} |
| San José | Aserrí | Monterrey | 10606 | 498 | 421 | +18.3% | 8.36 | 59.6/km^{2} |
| San José | Aserrí | Salitrillos | 10607 | 13,676 | 11,148 | +22.7% | 14.35 | 953.0/km^{2} |
| San José | Mora | Colón | 10701 | 16,088 | 13,477 | +19.4% | 40.12 | 401.0/km^{2} |
| San José | Mora | Guayabo | 10702 | 4,449 | 3,215 | +38.4% | 8.99 | 494.9/km^{2} |
| San José | Mora | Tabarcia | 10703 | 4,703 | 3,994 | +17.8% | 40.39 | 116.4/km^{2} |
| San José | Mora | Piedras Negras | 10704 | 379 | 318 | +19.2% | 14.84 | 25.5/km^{2} |
| San José | Mora | Picagres | 10705 | 675 | 662 | +2.0% | 27.2 | 24.8/km^{2} |
| San José | Mora | Jaris | 10706 | | | NA | 5.53 | |
| San José | Mora | Quitirrisí | 10707 | | | NA | 26.69 | |
| San José | Goicoechea | Guadalupe | 10801 | 20,663 | 23,723 | −12.9% | 2.38 | 8,681.9/km^{2} |
| San José | Goicoechea | San Francisco | 10802 | 2,032 | 2,552 | −20.4% | 0.57 | 3,564.9/km^{2} |
| San José | Goicoechea | Calle Blancos | 10803 | 18,984 | 19,411 | −2.2% | 2.36 | 8,044.1/km^{2} |
| San José | Goicoechea | Mata de Plátano | 10804 | 17,370 | 16,206 | +7.2% | 7.85 | 2,212.7/km^{2} |
| San José | Goicoechea | Ipís | 10805 | 26,033 | 26,155 | −0.5% | 2.37 | 10,984.4/km^{2} |
| San José | Goicoechea | Rancho Redondo | 10806 | 2,538 | 2,718 | −6.6% | 13.38 | 189.7/km^{2} |
| San José | Goicoechea | Purral | 10807 | 27,464 | 26,767 | +2.6% | 3.11 | 8,830.9/km^{2} |
| San José | Santa Ana | Santa Ana | 10901 | 11,320 | 8,517 | +32.9% | 5.4 | 2,096.3/km^{2} |
| San José | Santa Ana | Salitral | 10902 | 4,304 | 3,369 | +27.8% | 20.2 | 213.1/km^{2} |
| San José | Santa Ana | Pozos | 10903 | 15,585 | 9,025 | +72.7% | 13.34 | 1,168.3/km^{2} |
| San José | Santa Ana | Uruca | 10904 | 7,200 | 5,635 | +27.8% | 7.07 | 1,018.4/km^{2} |
| San José | Santa Ana | Piedades | 10905 | 8,128 | 6,199 | +31.1% | 12.01 | 676.8/km^{2} |
| San José | Santa Ana | Brasil | 10906 | 2,586 | 1,762 | +46.8% | 3.25 | 795.7/km^{2} |
| San José | Alajuelita | Alajuelita | 11001 | 11,988 | 12,247 | −2.1% | 1.3 | 9,221.5/km^{2} |
| San José | Alajuelita | San Josecito | 11002 | 10,506 | 8,500 | +23.6% | 2.42 | 4,341.3/km^{2} |
| San José | Alajuelita | San Antonio | 11003 | 4,739 | 3,193 | +48.4% | 10.22 | 463.7/km^{2} |
| San José | Alajuelita | Concepción | 11004 | 18,721 | 19,268 | −2.8% | 2.4 | 7,800.4/km^{2} |
| San José | Alajuelita | San Felipe | 11005 | 31,649 | 27,089 | +16.8% | 5.1 | 6,205.7/km^{2} |
| San José | Vázquez de Coronado | San Isidro | 11101 | 16,625 | 15,570 | +6.8% | 5.14 | 3,234.4/km^{2} |
| San José | Vázquez de Coronado | San Rafael | 11102 | 7,040 | 6,389 | +10.2% | 16.95 | 415.3/km^{2} |
| San José | Vázquez de Coronado | Dulce Nombre de Jesús | 11103 | 9,744 | 9,352 | +4.2% | 67.86 | 143.6/km^{2} |
| San José | Vázquez de Coronado | Patalillo | 11104 | 20,349 | 17,731 | +14.8% | 1.97 | 10,329.4/km^{2} |
| San José | Vázquez de Coronado | Cascajal | 11105 | 6,728 | 6,543 | +2.8% | 131.72 | 51.1/km^{2} |
| San José | Acosta | San Ignacio | 11201 | 9,016 | 7,728 | +16.7% | 22.63 | 398.4/km^{2} |
| San José | Acosta | Guaitil | 11202 | 2,406 | 2,555 | −5.8% | 43.85 | 54.9/km^{2} |
| San José | Acosta | Palmichal | 11203 | 4,581 | 3,852 | +18.9% | 34.17 | 134.1/km^{2} |
| San José | Acosta | Cangrejal | 11204 | 1,875 | 1,987 | −5.6% | 64.46 | 29.1/km^{2} |
| San José | Acosta | Sabanillas | 11205 | 2,331 | 2,539 | −8.2% | 176.83 | 13.2/km^{2} |
| San José | Tibás | San Juan | 11301 | 21,745 | 24,944 | −12.8% | 3.56 | 6,108.1/km^{2} |
| San José | Tibás | Cinco Esquinas | 11302 | 5,925 | 6,379 | −7.1% | 0.67 | 8,843.3/km^{2} |
| San José | Tibás | Anselmo Llorente | 11303 | 9,986 | 10,103 | −1.2% | 1.36 | 7,342.6/km^{2} |
| San José | Tibás | León XIII | 11304 | 13,661 | 16,400 | −16.7% | 0.78 | 17,514.1/km^{2} |
| San José | Tibás | Colima | 11305 | 13,525 | 14,248 | −5.1% | 2 | 6,762.5/km^{2} |
| San José | Moravia | San Vicente | 11401 | 30,998 | 31,693 | −2.2% | 5.39 | 5,751.0/km^{2} |
| San José | Moravia | San Jerónimo | 11402 | 6,154 | 4,911 | +25.3% | 18.58 | 331.2/km^{2} |
| San José | Moravia | La Trinidad | 11403 | 19,767 | 13,815 | +43.1% | 4.94 | 4,001.4/km^{2} |
| San José | Montes de Oca | San Pedro | 11501 | 23,977 | 26,524 | −9.6% | 4.7 | 5,101.5/km^{2} |
| San José | Montes de Oca | Sabanilla | 11502 | 10,775 | 11,324 | −4.8% | 1.78 | 6,053.4/km^{2} |
| San José | Montes de Oca | Mercedes | 11503 | 4,688 | 4,872 | −3.8% | 1.44 | 3,255.6/km^{2} |
| San José | Montes de Oca | San Rafael | 11504 | 9,692 | 7,713 | +25.7% | 7.74 | 1,252.2/km^{2} |
| San José | Turrubares | San Pablo | 11601 | 1,357 | 1,192 | +13.8% | 26.37 | 51.5/km^{2} |
| San José | Turrubares | San Pedro | 11602 | 646 | 499 | +29.5% | 39.11 | 16.5/km^{2} |
| San José | Turrubares | San Juan de Mata | 11603 | 1,182 | 2,725 | −56.6% | 86.17 | 13.7/km^{2} |
| San José | Turrubares | San Luis | 11604 | 517 | 461 | +12.1% | 43.71 | 11.8/km^{2} |
| San José | Turrubares | Carara | 11605 | 1,810 | 1,810 | 0.0% | 220.35 | 8.2/km^{2} |
| San José | Dota | Santa María | 11701 | 4,621 | 4,274 | +8.1% | 92.84 | 49.8/km^{2} |
| San José | Dota | Jardín | 11702 | 524 | 475 | +10.3% | 32.71 | 16.0/km^{2} |
| San José | Dota | Copey | 11703 | 1,803 | 1,770 | +1.9% | 279.41 | 6.5/km^{2} |
| San José | Curridabat | Curridabat | 11801 | 28,817 | 30,316 | −4.9% | 6.16 | 4,678.1/km^{2} |
| San José | Curridabat | Granadilla | 11802 | 14,778 | 11,600 | +27.4% | 3.52 | 4,198.3/km^{2} |
| San José | Curridabat | Sánchez | 11803 | 5,364 | 3,147 | +70.4% | 4.53 | 1,184.1/km^{2} |
| San José | Curridabat | Tirrases | 11804 | 16,247 | 15,826 | +2.7% | 1.87 | 8,688.2/km^{2} |
| San José | Pérez Zeledón | San Isidro de El General | 11901 | 45,327 | 41,221 | +10.0% | 191.53 | 236.7/km^{2} |
| San José | Pérez Zeledón | El General | 11902 | 6,373 | 5,882 | +8.3% | 76.35 | 83.5/km^{2} |
| San José | Pérez Zeledón | Daniel Flores | 11903 | 33,537 | 26,359 | +27.2% | 64.3 | 521.6/km^{2} |
| San José | Pérez Zeledón | Rivas | 11904 | 6,591 | 6,531 | +0.9% | 310.28 | 21.2/km^{2} |
| San José | Pérez Zeledón | San Pedro | 11905 | 9,102 | 9,013 | +1.0% | 205.96 | 44.2/km^{2} |
| San José | Pérez Zeledón | Platanares | 11906 | 7,203 | 7,308 | −1.4% | 79.84 | 90.2/km^{2} |
| San José | Pérez Zeledón | Pejibaye | 11907 | 7,995 | 8,627 | −7.3% | 140.78 | 56.8/km^{2} |
| San José | Pérez Zeledón | Cajón | 11908 | 8,542 | 7,467 | +14.4% | 118.86 | 71.9/km^{2} |
| San José | Pérez Zeledón | Barú | 11909 | 2,393 | 2,335 | +2.5% | 191.42 | 12.5/km^{2} |
| San José | Pérez Zeledón | Río Nuevo | 11910 | 3,061 | 3,219 | −4.9% | 240.68 | 12.7/km^{2} |
| San José | Pérez Zeledón | Páramo | 11911 | 4,410 | 4,225 | +4.4% | 203.17 | 21.7/km^{2} |
| San José | Pérez Zeledón | La Amistad | 11912 | | | NA | 76.11 | |
| San José | León Cortés Castro | San Pablo | 12001 | 4,209 | 3,780 | +11.3% | 20.86 | 201.8/km^{2} |
| San José | León Cortés Castro | San Andrés | 12002 | 1,578 | 1,804 | −12.5% | 16.08 | 98.1/km^{2} |
| San José | León Cortés Castro | Llano Bonito | 12003 | 2,111 | 2,135 | −1.1% | 34.51 | 61.2/km^{2} |
| San José | León Cortés Castro | San Isidro | 12004 | 1,531 | 1,426 | +7.4% | 18.86 | 81.2/km^{2} |
| San José | León Cortés Castro | Santa Cruz | 12005 | 1,665 | 1,626 | +2.4% | 21.97 | 75.8/km^{2} |
| San José | León Cortés Castro | San Antonio | 12006 | 1,106 | 925 | +19.6% | 10.15 | 109.0/km^{2} |
| Alajuela | Alajuela | Alajuela | 20101 | 42,975 | 42,889 | +0.2% | 8.89 | 4,834.1/km^{2} |
| Alajuela | Alajuela | San José | 20102 | 41,656 | 35,405 | +17.7% | 14.69 | 2,835.7/km^{2} |
| Alajuela | Alajuela | Carrizal | 20103 | 6,856 | 6,455 | +6.2% | 16.12 | 425.3/km^{2} |
| Alajuela | Alajuela | San Antonio | 20104 | 24,971 | 22,094 | +13.0% | 8.93 | 2,796.3/km^{2} |
| Alajuela | Alajuela | Guácima | 20105 | 20,183 | 15,450 | +30.6% | 28.04 | 719.8/km^{2} |
| Alajuela | Alajuela | San Isidro | 20106 | 17,294 | 16,247 | +6.4% | 36.09 | 479.2/km^{2} |
| Alajuela | Alajuela | Sabanilla | 20107 | 9,059 | 8,335 | +8.7% | 43.05 | 210.4/km^{2} |
| Alajuela | Alajuela | San Rafael | 20108 | 26,248 | 19,162 | +37.0% | 19.29 | 1,360.7/km^{2} |
| Alajuela | Alajuela | Río Segundo | 20109 | 10,794 | 11,036 | −2.2% | 5.57 | 1,937.9/km^{2} |
| Alajuela | Alajuela | Desamparados | 20110 | 26,109 | 21,075 | +23.9% | 12.95 | 2,016.1/km^{2} |
| Alajuela | Alajuela | Turrúcares | 20111 | 7,630 | 5,986 | +27.5% | 35.99 | 212.0/km^{2} |
| Alajuela | Alajuela | Tambor | 20112 | 10,992 | 9,370 | +17.3% | 13.88 | 791.9/km^{2} |
| Alajuela | Alajuela | Garita | 20113 | 7,277 | 6,856 | +6.1% | 33.91 | 214.6/km^{2} |
| Alajuela | Alajuela | Sarapiquí | 20114 | 2,842 | 2,493 | +14.0% | 113.98 | 24.9/km^{2} |
| Alajuela | San Ramón | San Ramón | 20201 | 8,717 | 9,659 | −9.8% | 1.28 | 6,810.2/km^{2} |
| Alajuela | San Ramón | Santiago | 20202 | 4,535 | 3,976 | +14.1% | 61 | 74.3/km^{2} |
| Alajuela | San Ramón | San Juan | 20203 | 11,695 | 9,690 | +20.7% | 5.09 | 2,297.6/km^{2} |
| Alajuela | San Ramón | Piedades Norte | 20204 | 8,147 | 6,846 | +19.0% | 47.2 | 172.6/km^{2} |
| Alajuela | San Ramón | Piedades Sur | 20205 | 3,738 | 3,448 | +8.4% | 116.29 | 32.1/km^{2} |
| Alajuela | San Ramón | San Rafael | 20206 | 9,321 | 8,384 | +11.2% | 30.73 | 303.3/km^{2} |
| Alajuela | San Ramón | San Isidro | 20207 | 4,478 | 3,553 | +26.0% | 8.72 | 513.5/km^{2} |
| Alajuela | San Ramón | Ángeles | 20208 | 8,500 | 7,073 | +20.2% | 81.41 | 104.4/km^{2} |
| Alajuela | San Ramón | Alfaro | 20209 | 7,137 | 4,741 | +50.5% | 17.87 | 399.4/km^{2} |
| Alajuela | San Ramón | Volio | 20210 | 2,270 | 1,669 | +36.0% | 20.46 | 110.9/km^{2} |
| Alajuela | San Ramón | Concepción | 20211 | 2,348 | 1,841 | +27.5% | 9.49 | 247.4/km^{2} |
| Alajuela | San Ramón | Zapotal | 20212 | 391 | 463 | −15.6% | 67.24 | 5.8/km^{2} |
| Alajuela | San Ramón | Peñas Blancas | 20213 | 9,289 | 6,632 | +40.1% | 247.04 | 37.6/km^{2} |
| Alajuela | San Ramón | San Lorenzo | 20214 | | | NA | 309.15 | |
| Alajuela | Grecia | Grecia | 20301 | 14,859 | 14,277 | +4.1% | 7.51 | 1,978.6/km^{2} |
| Alajuela | Grecia | San Isidro | 20302 | 5,949 | 5,201 | +14.4% | 17.01 | 349.7/km^{2} |
| Alajuela | Grecia | San José | 20303 | 8,100 | 6,206 | +30.5% | 12.36 | 655.3/km^{2} |
| Alajuela | Grecia | San Roque | 20304 | 11,132 | 9,163 | +21.5% | 27 | 412.3/km^{2} |
| Alajuela | Grecia | Tacares | 20305 | 7,963 | 6,879 | +15.8% | 24.82 | 320.8/km^{2} |
| Alajuela | Grecia | Puente de Piedra | 20307 | 10,556 | 9,325 | +13.2% | 23.07 | 457.6/km^{2} |
| Alajuela | Grecia | Bolívar | 20308 | 7,265 | 6,324 | +14.9% | 30.77 | 236.1/km^{2} |
| Alajuela | San Mateo | San Mateo | 20401 | 2,692 | 2,529 | +6.4% | 64.85 | 41.5/km^{2} |
| Alajuela | San Mateo | Desmonte | 20402 | 1,047 | 871 | +20.2% | 20.19 | 51.9/km^{2} |
| Alajuela | San Mateo | Jesús María | 20403 | 2,397 | 1,943 | +23.4% | 18.79 | 127.6/km^{2} |
| Alajuela | San Mateo | Labrador | 20404 | | | NA | 20.96 | |
| Alajuela | Atenas | Atenas | 20501 | 7,546 | 7,182 | +5.1% | 9.76 | 773.2/km^{2} |
| Alajuela | Atenas | Jesús | 20502 | 3,631 | 3,598 | +0.9% | 17.96 | 202.2/km^{2} |
| Alajuela | Atenas | Mercedes | 20503 | 3,127 | 2,691 | +16.2% | 7.81 | 400.4/km^{2} |
| Alajuela | Atenas | San Isidro | 20504 | 2,813 | 2,496 | +12.7% | 14.48 | 194.3/km^{2} |
| Alajuela | Atenas | Concepción | 20505 | 3,473 | 3,048 | +13.9% | 21.94 | 158.3/km^{2} |
| Alajuela | Atenas | San José | 20506 | 1,940 | 1,794 | +8.1% | 13.44 | 144.3/km^{2} |
| Alajuela | Atenas | Santa Eulalia | 20507 | 2,082 | 1,670 | +24.7% | 14.59 | 142.7/km^{2} |
| Alajuela | Atenas | Escobal | 20508 | 848 | 848 | 0.0% | 26.5 | 32.0/km^{2} |
| Alajuela | Naranjo | Naranjo | 20601 | 15,936 | 18,514 | −13.9% | 17.26 | 923.3/km^{2} |
| Alajuela | Naranjo | San Miguel | 20602 | 4,657 | 3,532 | +31.9% | 15.52 | 300.1/km^{2} |
| Alajuela | Naranjo | San José | 20603 | 3,162 | 3,225 | −2.0% | 21.12 | 149.7/km^{2} |
| Alajuela | Naranjo | Cirrí Sur | 20604 | 4,552 | 3,790 | +20.1% | 32.07 | 141.9/km^{2} |
| Alajuela | Naranjo | San Jerónimo | 20605 | 3,264 | 2,703 | +20.8% | 9.12 | 357.9/km^{2} |
| Alajuela | Naranjo | San Juan | 20606 | 3,114 | 2,709 | +15.0% | 6.78 | 459.3/km^{2} |
| Alajuela | Naranjo | El Rosario | 20607 | 3,757 | 3,129 | +20.1% | 17.21 | 218.3/km^{2} |
| Alajuela | Naranjo | Palmitos | 20608 | 4,271 | 4,271 | 0.0% | 8.09 | 527.9/km^{2} |
| Alajuela | Palmares | Palmares | 20701 | 3,599 | 4,105 | −12.3% | 1.14 | 3,157.0/km^{2} |
| Alajuela | Palmares | Zaragoza | 20702 | 8,219 | 7,493 | +9.7% | 8.34 | 985.5/km^{2} |
| Alajuela | Palmares | Buenos Aires | 20703 | 7,493 | 6,879 | +8.9% | 6.88 | 1,089.1/km^{2} |
| Alajuela | Palmares | Santiago | 20704 | 2,737 | 2,682 | +2.1% | 7.94 | 344.7/km^{2} |
| Alajuela | Palmares | Candelaria | 20705 | 1,961 | 1,745 | +12.4% | 4.69 | 418.1/km^{2} |
| Alajuela | Palmares | Esquipulas | 20706 | 6,588 | 3,652 | +80.4% | 5.41 | 1,217.7/km^{2} |
| Alajuela | Palmares | La Granja | 20707 | 4,119 | 3,210 | +28.3% | 4.44 | 927.7/km^{2} |
| Alajuela | Poás | San Pedro | 20801 | 7,554 | 6,913 | +9.3% | 13.63 | 554.2/km^{2} |
| Alajuela | Poás | San Juan | 20802 | 4,638 | 3,738 | +24.1% | 16.31 | 284.4/km^{2} |
| Alajuela | Poás | San Rafael | 20803 | 5,436 | 5,025 | +8.2% | 14.19 | 383.1/km^{2} |
| Alajuela | Poás | Carrillos | 20804 | 9,228 | 6,901 | +33.7% | 10.14 | 910.1/km^{2} |
| Alajuela | Poás | Sabana Redonda | 20805 | 2,343 | 2,187 | +7.1% | 20.33 | 115.2/km^{2} |
| Alajuela | Orotina | Orotina | 20901 | 9,664 | 8,045 | +20.1% | 21.59 | 447.6/km^{2} |
| Alajuela | Orotina | El Mastate | 20902 | 1,821 | 1,624 | +12.1% | 9.53 | 191.1/km^{2} |
| Alajuela | Orotina | Hacienda Vieja | 20903 | 1,022 | 890 | +14.8% | 16.93 | 60.4/km^{2} |
| Alajuela | Orotina | Coyolar | 20904 | 5,912 | 3,636 | +62.6% | 36.51 | 161.9/km^{2} |
| Alajuela | Orotina | La Ceiba | 20905 | 1,922 | 1,510 | +27.3% | 60.55 | 31.7/km^{2} |
| Alajuela | San Carlos | Quesada | 21001 | 42,060 | 36,365 | +15.7% | 144 | 292.1/km^{2} |
| Alajuela | San Carlos | Florencia | 21002 | 15,149 | 12,444 | +21.7% | 198.54 | 76.3/km^{2} |
| Alajuela | San Carlos | Buenavista | 21003 | 325 | 352 | −7.7% | 25.98 | 12.5/km^{2} |
| Alajuela | San Carlos | Aguas Zarcas | 21004 | 20,239 | 13,651 | +48.3% | 185.86 | 108.9/km^{2} |
| Alajuela | San Carlos | Venecia | 21005 | 9,638 | 7,394 | +30.3% | 132.44 | 72.8/km^{2} |
| Alajuela | San Carlos | Pital | 21006 | 17,318 | 12,317 | +40.6% | 379.61 | 45.6/km^{2} |
| Alajuela | San Carlos | La Fortuna | 21007 | 15,383 | 9,743 | +57.9% | 229.7 | 67.0/km^{2} |
| Alajuela | San Carlos | La Tigra | 21008 | 6,374 | 5,368 | +18.7% | 56.44 | 112.9/km^{2} |
| Alajuela | San Carlos | La Palmera | 21009 | 6,321 | 4,608 | +37.2% | 100.45 | 62.9/km^{2} |
| Alajuela | San Carlos | Venado | 21010 | 1,754 | 1,705 | +2.9% | 169.28 | 10.4/km^{2} |
| Alajuela | San Carlos | Cutris | 21011 | 10,334 | 7,892 | +30.9% | 848.01 | 12.2/km^{2} |
| Alajuela | San Carlos | Monterrey | 21012 | 3,455 | 3,124 | +10.6% | 220.2 | 15.7/km^{2} |
| Alajuela | San Carlos | Pocosol | 21013 | 15,395 | 12,177 | +26.4% | 660.75 | 23.3/km^{2} |
| Alajuela | Zarcero | Zarcero | 21101 | 4,004 | 3,790 | +5.6% | 11.72 | 341.6/km^{2} |
| Alajuela | Zarcero | Laguna | 21102 | 1,674 | 1,579 | +6.0% | 23.36 | 71.7/km^{2} |
| Alajuela | Zarcero | Tapesco | 21103 | 1,305 | 1,040 | +25.5% | 6.33 | 206.2/km^{2} |
| Alajuela | Zarcero | Guadalupe | 21104 | 1,148 | 774 | +48.3% | 22.58 | 50.8/km^{2} |
| Alajuela | Zarcero | Palmira | 21105 | 1,334 | 1,308 | +2.0% | 30.44 | 43.8/km^{2} |
| Alajuela | Zarcero | Zapote | 21106 | 739 | 723 | +2.2% | 44.77 | 16.5/km^{2} |
| Alajuela | Zarcero | Brisas | 21107 | 2,001 | 1,631 | +22.7% | 17.87 | 112.0/km^{2} |
| Alajuela | Sarchí | Sarchí Norte | 21201 | 7,140 | 6,470 | +10.4% | 21.3 | 335.2/km^{2} |
| Alajuela | Sarchí | Sarchí Sur | 21202 | 5,143 | 4,337 | +18.6% | 6.36 | 808.6/km^{2} |
| Alajuela | Sarchí | Toro Amarillo | 21203 | 273 | 295 | −7.5% | 90.93 | 3.0/km^{2} |
| Alajuela | Sarchí | San Pedro | 21204 | 3,408 | 3,296 | +3.4% | 10.92 | 312.1/km^{2} |
| Alajuela | Sarchí | Rodríguez | 21205 | 2,121 | 1,841 | +15.2% | 7.21 | 294.2/km^{2} |
| Alajuela | Upala | Upala | 21301 | 16,139 | 12,372 | +30.4% | 148.65 | 108.6/km^{2} |
| Alajuela | Upala | Aguas Claras | 21302 | 4,939 | 5,026 | −1.7% | 408.93 | 12.1/km^{2} |
| Alajuela | Upala | San José | 21303 | 7,352 | 6,826 | +7.7% | 285.39 | 25.8/km^{2} |
| Alajuela | Upala | Bijagua | 21304 | 4,538 | 4,042 | +12.3% | 186.39 | 24.3/km^{2} |
| Alajuela | Upala | Delicias | 21305 | 4,483 | 3,618 | +23.9% | 98.57 | 45.5/km^{2} |
| Alajuela | Upala | Dos Ríos | 21306 | 3,194 | 2,776 | +15.1% | 218.07 | 14.6/km^{2} |
| Alajuela | Upala | Yolillal | 21307 | 3,308 | 3,019 | +9.6% | 139.54 | 23.7/km^{2} |
| Alajuela | Upala | Canalete | 21308 | | | NA | 106.45 | |
| Alajuela | Los Chiles | Los Chiles | 21401 | 13,262 | 9,900 | +34.0% | 504.21 | 26.3/km^{2} |
| Alajuela | Los Chiles | Caño Negro | 21402 | 1,808 | 1,594 | +13.4% | 301 | 6.0/km^{2} |
| Alajuela | Los Chiles | El Amparo | 21403 | 5,992 | 5,390 | +11.2% | 313.29 | 19.1/km^{2} |
| Alajuela | Los Chiles | San Jorge | 21404 | 2,673 | 2,848 | −6.1% | 214.94 | 12.4/km^{2} |
| Alajuela | Guatuso | San Rafael | 21501 | 7,941 | 6,611 | +20.1% | 304.29 | 26.1/km^{2} |
| Alajuela | Guatuso | Buenavista | 21502 | 1,573 | 5,452 | −71.1% | 150.97 | 10.4/km^{2} |
| Alajuela | Guatuso | Cote | 21503 | 867 | 982 | −11.7% | 183.94 | 4.7/km^{2} |
| Alajuela | Guatuso | Katira | 21504 | 5,127 | 5,127 | 0.0% | 114.4 | 44.8/km^{2} |
| Alajuela | Río Cuarto | Río Cuarto | 21601 | 11,074 | 7,744 | +43.0% | | |
| Alajuela | Río Cuarto | Santa Rita | 21602 | | | NA | | |
| Alajuela | Río Cuarto | Santa Isabel | 21603 | | | NA | | |
| Cartago | Cartago | Oriental | 30101 | 12,228 | 12,839 | −4.8% | 2.04 | 5,994.1/km^{2} |
| Cartago | Cartago | Occidental | 30102 | 9,901 | 11,139 | −11.1% | 2 | 4,950.5/km^{2} |
| Cartago | Cartago | Carmen | 30103 | 17,425 | 15,980 | +9.0% | 4.39 | 3,969.2/km^{2} |
| Cartago | Cartago | San Nicolás | 30104 | 25,948 | 22,193 | +16.9% | 29.44 | 881.4/km^{2} |
| Cartago | Cartago | Aguacaliente | 30105 | 31,789 | 28,516 | +11.5% | 100.37 | 316.7/km^{2} |
| Cartago | Cartago | Guadalupe | 30106 | 14,618 | 12,515 | +16.8% | 13.28 | 1,100.8/km^{2} |
| Cartago | Cartago | Corralillo | 30107 | 10,647 | 9,366 | +13.7% | 32.57 | 326.9/km^{2} |
| Cartago | Cartago | Tierra Blanca | 30108 | 5,103 | 4,639 | +10.0% | 12.75 | 400.2/km^{2} |
| Cartago | Cartago | Dulce Nombre | 30109 | 10,548 | 6,508 | +62.1% | 33.11 | 318.6/km^{2} |
| Cartago | Cartago | Llano Grande | 30110 | 4,342 | 3,665 | +18.5% | 30.35 | 143.1/km^{2} |
| Cartago | Cartago | Quebradilla | 30111 | 5,349 | 4,697 | +13.9% | 18.91 | 282.9/km^{2} |
| Cartago | Paraíso | Paraíso | 30201 | 20,601 | 33,398 | −38.3% | 19.5 | 1,056.5/km^{2} |
| Cartago | Paraíso | Santiago | 30202 | 5,534 | 4,960 | +11.6% | 25.5 | 217.0/km^{2} |
| Cartago | Paraíso | Orosi | 30203 | 9,084 | 8,862 | +2.5% | 376.41 | 24.1/km^{2} |
| Cartago | Paraíso | Cachí | 30204 | 5,438 | 5,173 | +5.1% | 41.24 | 131.9/km^{2} |
| Cartago | Paraíso | Llanos de Santa Lucía | 30205 | 17,086 | 17,086 | 0.0% | 6.55 | 2,608.5/km^{2} |
| Cartago | Paraíso | Birrisito | 30206 | | | | 7.5 | |
| Cartago | La Unión | Tres Ríos | 30301 | 9,331 | 10,009 | −6.8% | 2.19 | 4,260.7/km^{2} |
| Cartago | La Unión | San Diego | 30302 | 21,620 | 16,595 | +30.3% | 8.01 | 2,699.1/km^{2} |
| Cartago | La Unión | San Juan | 30303 | 13,729 | 8,139 | +68.7% | 3.94 | 3,484.5/km^{2} |
| Cartago | La Unión | San Rafael | 30304 | 14,247 | 10,961 | +30.0% | 9.46 | 1,506.0/km^{2} |
| Cartago | La Unión | Concepción | 30305 | 16,515 | 12,910 | +27.9% | 3.8 | 4,346.1/km^{2} |
| Cartago | La Unión | Dulce Nombre | 30306 | 7,893 | 6,598 | +19.6% | 8.35 | 945.3/km^{2} |
| Cartago | La Unión | San Ramón | 30307 | 4,054 | 4,640 | −12.6% | 3.47 | 1,168.3/km^{2} |
| Cartago | La Unión | Río Azul | 30308 | 12,010 | 10,427 | +15.2% | 4.89 | 2,456.0/km^{2} |
| Cartago | Jiménez | Juan Viñas | 30401 | 6,552 | 6,387 | +2.6% | 43.62 | 150.2/km^{2} |
| Cartago | Jiménez | Tucurrique | 30402 | 4,872 | 4,284 | +13.7% | 33.52 | 145.3/km^{2} |
| Cartago | Jiménez | Pejibaye | 30403 | 3,245 | 3,375 | −3.9% | 173.85 | 18.7/km^{2} |
| Cartago | Jiménez | La Victoria | 30404 | | | | 15.34 | |
| Cartago | Turrialba | Turrialba | 30501 | 26,680 | 32,004 | −16.6% | 56.1 | 475.6/km^{2} |
| Cartago | Turrialba | La Suiza | 30502 | 7,590 | 9,202 | −17.5% | 160.36 | 47.3/km^{2} |
| Cartago | Turrialba | Peralta | 30503 | 511 | 570 | −10.4% | 9.53 | 53.6/km^{2} |
| Cartago | Turrialba | Santa Cruz | 30504 | 3,208 | 3,421 | −6.2% | 124.94 | 25.7/km^{2} |
| Cartago | Turrialba | Santa Teresita | 30505 | 4,744 | 5,095 | −6.9% | 60 | 79.1/km^{2} |
| Cartago | Turrialba | Pavones | 30506 | 4,331 | 4,431 | −2.3% | 42.13 | 102.8/km^{2} |
| Cartago | Turrialba | Tuis | 30507 | 2,837 | 2,630 | +7.9% | 38.88 | 73.0/km^{2} |
| Cartago | Turrialba | Tayutic | 30508 | 2,374 | 4,452 | −46.7% | 74.91 | 31.7/km^{2} |
| Cartago | Turrialba | Santa Rosa | 30509 | 5,232 | 4,759 | +9.9% | 22.29 | 234.7/km^{2} |
| Cartago | Turrialba | Tres Equis | 30510 | 1,808 | 1,946 | −7.1% | 37.18 | 48.6/km^{2} |
| Cartago | Turrialba | La Isabel | 30511 | 6,116 | 6,116 | 0.0% | 19.96 | 306.4/km^{2} |
| Cartago | Turrialba | Chirripó | 30512 | 4,185 | 4,185 | 0.0% | 942.09 | 4.4/km^{2} |
| Cartago | Alvarado | Pacayas | 30601 | 5,628 | 5,386 | +4.5% | 29.68 | 189.6/km^{2} |
| Cartago | Alvarado | Cervantes | 30602 | 6,230 | 4,709 | +32.3% | 15.19 | 410.1/km^{2} |
| Cartago | Alvarado | Capellades | 30603 | 2,454 | 2,195 | +11.8% | 34.32 | 71.5/km^{2} |
| Cartago | Oreamuno | San Rafael | 30701 | 27,248 | 23,707 | +14.9% | 10.27 | 2,653.2/km^{2} |
| Cartago | Oreamuno | Cot | 30702 | 9,630 | 7,813 | +23.3% | 15.05 | 639.9/km^{2} |
| Cartago | Oreamuno | Potrero Cerrado | 30703 | 2,281 | 2,023 | +12.8% | 18.2 | 125.3/km^{2} |
| Cartago | Oreamuno | Cipreses | 30704 | 3,700 | 2,887 | +28.2% | 9.31 | 397.4/km^{2} |
| Cartago | Oreamuno | Santa Rosa | 30705 | 2,614 | 2,602 | +0.5% | 149.81 | 17.4/km^{2} |
| Cartago | El Guarco | El Tejar | 30801 | 24,984 | 18,648 | +34.0% | 6.07 | 4,116.0/km^{2} |
| Cartago | El Guarco | San Isidro | 30802 | 9,828 | 9,165 | +7.2% | 134.73 | 72.9/km^{2} |
| Cartago | El Guarco | Tobosi | 30803 | 6,569 | 5,418 | +21.2% | 19.9 | 330.1/km^{2} |
| Cartago | El Guarco | Patio de Agua | 30804 | 412 | 557 | −26.0% | 11.05 | 37.3/km^{2} |
| Heredia | Heredia | Heredia | 40101 | 18,697 | 20,191 | −7.4% | 2.95 | 6,338.0/km^{2} |
| Heredia | Heredia | Mercedes | 40102 | 25,744 | 19,717 | +30.6% | 4.15 | 6,203.4/km^{2} |
| Heredia | Heredia | San Francisco | 40103 | 49,209 | 40,840 | +20.5% | 6.43 | 7,653.0/km^{2} |
| Heredia | Heredia | Ulloa | 40104 | 29,266 | 22,456 | +30.3% | 11.47 | 2,551.5/km^{2} |
| Heredia | Heredia | Varablanca | 40105 | 700 | 690 | +1.4% | 258.05 | 2.7/km^{2} |
| Heredia | Barva | Barva | 40201 | 4,997 | 4,890 | +2.2% | 0.82 | 6,093.9/km^{2} |
| Heredia | Barva | San Pedro | 40202 | 9,932 | 8,560 | +16.0% | 7.16 | 1,387.2/km^{2} |
| Heredia | Barva | San Pablo | 40203 | 8,319 | 6,656 | +25.0% | 6.94 | 1,198.7/km^{2} |
| Heredia | Barva | San Roque | 40204 | 4,622 | 3,071 | +50.5% | 1.29 | 3,582.9/km^{2} |
| Heredia | Barva | Santa Lucía | 40205 | 7,413 | 5,462 | +35.7% | 2.87 | 2,582.9/km^{2} |
| Heredia | Barva | San José de la Montaña | 40206 | 5,377 | 3,801 | +41.5% | 36.82 | 146.0/km^{2} |
| Heredia | Barva | Puente Salas | 40207 | | | | | |
| Heredia | Santo Domingo | Santo Domingo | 40301 | 4,730 | 5,181 | −8.7% | 0.79 | 5,987.3/km^{2} |
| Heredia | Santo Domingo | San Vicente | 40302 | 6,427 | 5,167 | +24.4% | 2.91 | 2,208.6/km^{2} |
| Heredia | Santo Domingo | San Miguel | 40303 | 6,363 | 5,694 | +11.7% | 5.9 | 1,078.5/km^{2} |
| Heredia | Santo Domingo | Paracito | 40304 | 2,231 | 1,604 | +39.1% | 1.12 | 1,992.0/km^{2} |
| Heredia | Santo Domingo | Santo Tomás | 40305 | 6,267 | 5,222 | +20.0% | 3.51 | 1,785.5/km^{2} |
| Heredia | Santo Domingo | Santa Rosa | 40306 | 7,269 | 6,396 | +13.6% | 4.25 | 1,710.4/km^{2} |
| Heredia | Santo Domingo | Tures | 40307 | 3,452 | 2,720 | +26.9% | 3.9 | 885.1/km^{2} |
| Heredia | Santo Domingo | Pará | 40308 | 3,333 | 2,764 | +20.6% | 2.88 | 1,157.3/km^{2} |
| Heredia | Santa Bárbara | Santa Bárbara | 40401 | 5,944 | 5,452 | +9.0% | 1.27 | 4,680.3/km^{2} |
| Heredia | Santa Bárbara | San Pedro | 40402 | 5,582 | 3,652 | +52.8% | 2.48 | 2,250.8/km^{2} |
| Heredia | Santa Bárbara | San Juan | 40403 | 7,662 | 6,245 | +22.7% | 4.45 | 1,721.8/km^{2} |
| Heredia | Santa Bárbara | Jesús | 40404 | 9,603 | 7,585 | +26.6% | 11.18 | 858.9/km^{2} |
| Heredia | Santa Bárbara | Santo Domingo | 40405 | 2,879 | 2,647 | +8.8% | 26.43 | 108.9/km^{2} |
| Heredia | Santa Bárbara | Purabá | 40406 | 4,573 | 3,600 | +27.0% | 6.09 | 750.9/km^{2} |
| Heredia | San Rafael | San Rafael | 40501 | 9,668 | 8,651 | +11.8% | 1.3 | 7,436.9/km^{2} |
| Heredia | San Rafael | San Josecito | 40502 | 11,579 | 10,826 | +7.0% | 1.35 | 8,577.0/km^{2} |
| Heredia | San Rafael | Santiago | 40503 | 8,409 | 6,878 | +22.3% | 1.64 | 5,127.4/km^{2} |
| Heredia | San Rafael | Ángeles | 40504 | 10,232 | 6,780 | +50.9% | 21.23 | 482.0/km^{2} |
| Heredia | San Rafael | Concepción | 40505 | 6,077 | 4,158 | +46.2% | 22.67 | 268.1/km^{2} |
| Heredia | San Isidro | San Isidro | 40601 | 6,113 | 4,990 | +22.5% | 2.66 | 2,298.1/km^{2} |
| Heredia | San Isidro | San José | 40602 | 7,447 | 5,102 | +46.0% | 11.37 | 655.0/km^{2} |
| Heredia | San Isidro | Concepción | 40603 | 2,635 | 2,081 | +26.6% | 8.03 | 328.1/km^{2} |
| Heredia | San Isidro | San Francisco | 40604 | 4,438 | 3,883 | +14.3% | 4.6 | 964.8/km^{2} |
| Heredia | Belén | San Antonio | 40701 | 9,942 | 10,256 | −3.1% | 3.54 | 2,808.5/km^{2} |
| Heredia | Belén | La Ribera | 40702 | 6,040 | 5,687 | +6.2% | 4.28 | 1,411.2/km^{2} |
| Heredia | Belén | La Asunción | 40703 | 5,651 | 3,891 | +45.2% | 4.62 | 1,223.2/km^{2} |
| Heredia | Flores | San Joaquín | 40801 | 7,173 | 6,346 | +13.0% | 2.58 | 2,780.2/km^{2} |
| Heredia | Flores | Barrantes | 40802 | 4,091 | 2,810 | +45.6% | 2.3 | 1,778.7/km^{2} |
| Heredia | Flores | Llorente | 40803 | 8,773 | 5,882 | +49.1% | 1.89 | 4,641.8/km^{2} |
| Heredia | San Pablo | San Pablo | 40901 | 19,412 | 20,813 | −6.7% | 5.88 | 3,301.4/km^{2} |
| Heredia | San Pablo | Rincón de Sabanilla | 40902 | 8,259 | 8,259 | 0.0% | 2.36 | 3,499.6/km^{2} |
| Heredia | Sarapiquí | Puerto Viejo | 41001 | 20,184 | 16,272 | +24.0% | 428.17 | 47.1/km^{2} |
| Heredia | Sarapiquí | La Virgen | 41002 | 10,521 | 7,648 | +37.6% | 513.82 | 20.5/km^{2} |
| Heredia | Sarapiquí | Las Horquetas | 41003 | 24,331 | 20,094 | +21.1% | 565.41 | 43.0/km^{2} |
| Heredia | Sarapiquí | Llanuras del Gaspar | 41004 | 1,160 | 662 | +75.2% | 267.74 | 4.3/km^{2} |
| Heredia | Sarapiquí | Cureña | 41005 | 951 | 759 | +25.3% | 369.02 | 2.6/km^{2} |
| Guanacaste | Liberia | Liberia | 50101 | 53,382 | 39,242 | +36.0% | 563.57 | 94.7/km^{2} |
| Guanacaste | Liberia | Cañas Dulces | 50102 | 3,230 | 2,634 | +22.6% | 243.39 | 13.3/km^{2} |
| Guanacaste | Liberia | Mayorga | 50103 | 1,599 | 1,288 | +24.1% | 227.39 | 7.0/km^{2} |
| Guanacaste | Liberia | Nacascolo | 50104 | 2,249 | 1,727 | +30.2% | 327.05 | 6.9/km^{2} |
| Guanacaste | Liberia | Curubandé | 50105 | 2,527 | 1,812 | +39.5% | 81.14 | 31.1/km^{2} |
| Guanacaste | Nicoya | Nicoya | 50201 | 24,833 | 20,945 | +18.6% | 310.61 | 79.9/km^{2} |
| Guanacaste | Nicoya | Mansión | 50202 | 5,717 | 4,663 | +22.6% | 212.47 | 26.9/km^{2} |
| Guanacaste | Nicoya | San Antonio | 50203 | 6,642 | 6,662 | −0.3% | 334.01 | 19.9/km^{2} |
| Guanacaste | Nicoya | Quebrada Honda | 50204 | 2,523 | 2,323 | +8.6% | 106.03 | 23.8/km^{2} |
| Guanacaste | Nicoya | Sámara | 50205 | 3,512 | 2,603 | +34.9% | 109.19 | 32.2/km^{2} |
| Guanacaste | Nicoya | Nosara | 50206 | 4,912 | 2,875 | +70.9% | 134.57 | 36.5/km^{2} |
| Guanacaste | Nicoya | Belén de Nosarita | 50207 | 2,686 | 2,118 | +26.8% | 123 | 21.8/km^{2} |
| Guanacaste | Santa Cruz | Santa Cruz | 50301 | 21,544 | 17,486 | +23.2% | 289.6 | 74.4/km^{2} |
| Guanacaste | Santa Cruz | Bolsón | 50302 | 1,627 | 1,605 | +1.4% | 32.47 | 50.1/km^{2} |
| Guanacaste | Santa Cruz | Veintisiete de Abril | 50303 | 7,048 | 4,928 | +43.0% | 301.59 | 23.4/km^{2} |
| Guanacaste | Santa Cruz | Tempate | 50304 | 5,630 | 3,395 | +65.8% | 129.95 | 43.3/km^{2} |
| Guanacaste | Santa Cruz | Cartagena | 50305 | 3,824 | 2,986 | +28.1% | 82.56 | 46.3/km^{2} |
| Guanacaste | Santa Cruz | Cuajiniquil | 50306 | 1,789 | 1,547 | +15.6% | 218.65 | 8.2/km^{2} |
| Guanacaste | Santa Cruz | Diriá | 50307 | 3,905 | 3,217 | +21.4% | 66.26 | 58.9/km^{2} |
| Guanacaste | Santa Cruz | Cabo Velas | 50308 | 3,362 | 2,132 | +57.7% | 73.5 | 45.7/km^{2} |
| Guanacaste | Santa Cruz | Tamarindo | 50309 | 6,375 | 3,525 | +80.9% | 125.86 | 50.7/km^{2} |
| Guanacaste | Bagaces | Bagaces | 50401 | 12,367 | 9,261 | +33.5% | 883.98 | 14.0/km^{2} |
| Guanacaste | Bagaces | La Fortuna | 50402 | 2,756 | 2,828 | −2.5% | 163.37 | 16.9/km^{2} |
| Guanacaste | Bagaces | Mogote | 50403 | 3,398 | 2,886 | +17.7% | 181.79 | 18.7/km^{2} |
| Guanacaste | Bagaces | Río Naranjo | 50404 | 1,015 | 997 | +1.8% | 43.83 | 23.2/km^{2} |
| Guanacaste | Carrillo | Filadelfia | 50501 | 7,953 | 7,143 | +11.3% | 125.14 | 63.6/km^{2} |
| Guanacaste | Carrillo | Palmira | 50502 | 5,416 | 3,974 | +36.3% | 31.42 | 172.4/km^{2} |
| Guanacaste | Carrillo | Sardinal | 50503 | 14,912 | 10,118 | +47.4% | 261.43 | 57.0/km^{2} |
| Guanacaste | Carrillo | Belén | 50504 | 8,841 | 6,071 | +45.6% | 181.55 | 48.7/km^{2} |
| Guanacaste | Cañas | Cañas | 50601 | 20,816 | 18,798 | +10.7% | 193.83 | 107.4/km^{2} |
| Guanacaste | Cañas | Palmira | 50602 | 988 | 916 | +7.9% | 203.96 | 4.8/km^{2} |
| Guanacaste | Cañas | San Miguel | 50603 | 1,644 | 1,520 | +8.2% | 120.86 | 13.6/km^{2} |
| Guanacaste | Cañas | Bebedero | 50604 | 2,084 | 2,123 | −1.8% | 58.26 | 35.8/km^{2} |
| Guanacaste | Cañas | Porozal | 50605 | 669 | 719 | −7.0% | 105.23 | 6.4/km^{2} |
| Guanacaste | Abangares | Las Juntas | 50701 | 9,482 | 8,612 | +10.1% | 229.16 | 41.4/km^{2} |
| Guanacaste | Abangares | Sierra | 50702 | 2,351 | 2,248 | +4.6% | 112.01 | 21.0/km^{2} |
| Guanacaste | Abangares | San Juan | 50703 | 1,585 | 1,340 | +18.3% | 107.46 | 14.7/km^{2} |
| Guanacaste | Abangares | Colorado | 50704 | 4,621 | 4,076 | +13.4% | 201.04 | 23.0/km^{2} |
| Guanacaste | Tilarán | Tilarán | 50801 | 8,677 | 7,706 | +12.6% | 139.43 | 62.2/km^{2} |
| Guanacaste | Tilarán | Quebrada Grande | 50802 | 2,700 | 2,508 | +7.7% | 33.72 | 80.1/km^{2} |
| Guanacaste | Tilarán | Tronadora | 50803 | 1,795 | 1,745 | +2.9% | 142.28 | 12.6/km^{2} |
| Guanacaste | Tilarán | Santa Rosa | 50804 | 1,945 | 1,690 | +15.1% | 71.8 | 27.1/km^{2} |
| Guanacaste | Tilarán | Líbano | 50805 | 865 | 860 | +0.6% | 72.07 | 12.0/km^{2} |
| Guanacaste | Tilarán | Tierras Morenas | 50806 | 1,358 | 1,187 | +14.4% | 83.46 | 16.3/km^{2} |
| Guanacaste | Tilarán | Arenal | 50807 | 2,300 | 2,175 | +5.7% | 73.72 | 31.2/km^{2} |
| Guanacaste | Tilarán | Cabeceras | 50808 | | | NA | 51.25 | |
| Guanacaste | Nandayure | Carmona | 50901 | 2,486 | 2,012 | +23.6% | 31.83 | 78.1/km^{2} |
| Guanacaste | Nandayure | Santa Rita | 50902 | 1,446 | 1,489 | −2.9% | 51.32 | 28.2/km^{2} |
| Guanacaste | Nandayure | Zapotal | 50903 | 1,215 | 1,267 | −4.1% | 105.18 | 11.6/km^{2} |
| Guanacaste | Nandayure | San Pablo | 50904 | 2,207 | 1,734 | +27.3% | 78.13 | 28.2/km^{2} |
| Guanacaste | Nandayure | Porvenir | 50905 | 741 | 994 | −25.5% | 40.17 | 18.4/km^{2} |
| Guanacaste | Nandayure | Bejuco | 50906 | 3,026 | 2,489 | +21.6% | 262.17 | 11.5/km^{2} |
| Guanacaste | La Cruz | La Cruz | 51001 | 9,195 | 7,880 | +16.7% | 345.5 | 26.6/km^{2} |
| Guanacaste | La Cruz | Santa Cecilia | 51002 | 6,258 | 5,238 | +19.5% | 258.16 | 24.2/km^{2} |
| Guanacaste | La Cruz | La Garita | 51003 | 1,688 | 1,581 | +6.8% | 273.37 | 6.2/km^{2} |
| Guanacaste | La Cruz | Santa Elena | 51004 | 2,040 | 1,806 | +13.0% | 513.35 | 4.0/km^{2} |
| Guanacaste | Hojancha | Hojancha | 51101 | 4,245 | 3,751 | +13.2% | 79.05 | 53.7/km^{2} |
| Guanacaste | Hojancha | Monte Romo | 51102 | 671 | 799 | −16.0% | 74.97 | 9.0/km^{2} |
| Guanacaste | Hojancha | Puerto Carrillo | 51103 | 1,574 | 1,287 | +22.3% | 76.75 | 20.5/km^{2} |
| Guanacaste | Hojancha | Huacas | 51104 | 707 | 697 | +1.4% | 31.49 | 22.5/km^{2} |
| Guanacaste | Hojancha | Matambú | 51105 | | | NA | | |
| Puntarenas | Puntarenas | Puntarenas | 60101 | 8,335 | 9,559 | −12.8% | 34.6 | 240.9/km^{2} |
| Puntarenas | Puntarenas | Pitahaya | 60102 | 2,211 | 1,822 | +21.4% | 109.66 | 20.2/km^{2} |
| Puntarenas | Puntarenas | Chomes | 60103 | 5,522 | 4,166 | +32.5% | 120.3 | 45.9/km^{2} |
| Puntarenas | Puntarenas | Lepanto | 60104 | 9,502 | 8,928 | +6.4% | 424.74 | 22.4/km^{2} |
| Puntarenas | Puntarenas | Paquera | 60105 | 6,686 | 5,666 | +18.0% | 337.7 | 19.8/km^{2} |
| Puntarenas | Puntarenas | Manzanillo | 60106 | 2,811 | 3,192 | −11.9% | 60.31 | 46.6/km^{2} |
| Puntarenas | Puntarenas | Guacimal | 60107 | 923 | 990 | −6.8% | 114.49 | 8.1/km^{2} |
| Puntarenas | Puntarenas | Barranca | 60108 | 30,650 | 33,493 | −8.5% | 36.07 | 849.7/km^{2} |
| Puntarenas | Puntarenas | Isla del Coco | 60110 | | | NA | 23.52 | |
| Puntarenas | Puntarenas | Cóbano | 60111 | 7,494 | 4,576 | +63.8% | 317.06 | 23.6/km^{2} |
| Puntarenas | Puntarenas | Chacarita | 60112 | 17,434 | 23,163 | −24.7% | 4.92 | 3,543.5/km^{2} |
| Puntarenas | Puntarenas | Chira | 60113 | 1,576 | 1,534 | +2.7% | 41.71 | 37.8/km^{2} |
| Puntarenas | Puntarenas | Acapulco | 60114 | 1,296 | 2,130 | −39.2% | 111.2 | 11.7/km^{2} |
| Puntarenas | Puntarenas | El Roble | 60115 | 15,759 | 15,759 | 0.0% | 7.94 | 1,984.8/km^{2} |
| Puntarenas | Puntarenas | Arancibia | 60116 | 665 | 665 | 0.0% | 45.04 | 14.8/km^{2} |
| Puntarenas | Esparza | Espíritu Santo | 60201 | 15,686 | 15,842 | −1.0% | 18.95 | 827.8/km^{2} |
| Puntarenas | Esparza | San Juan Grande | 60202 | 6,171 | 3,437 | +79.5% | 18.7 | 330.0/km^{2} |
| Puntarenas | Esparza | Macacona | 60203 | 4,742 | 2,776 | +70.8% | 33.51 | 141.5/km^{2} |
| Puntarenas | Esparza | San Rafael | 60204 | 1,294 | 1,135 | +14.0% | 34.35 | 37.7/km^{2} |
| Puntarenas | Esparza | San Jerónimo | 60205 | 751 | 773 | −2.8% | 49.95 | 15.0/km^{2} |
| Puntarenas | Esparza | Caldera | 60206 | | | NA | 62.01 | |
| Puntarenas | Buenos Aires | Buenos Aires | 60301 | 21,063 | 16,843 | +25.1% | 555.37 | 37.9/km^{2} |
| Puntarenas | Buenos Aires | Volcán | 60302 | 3,815 | 6,471 | −41.0% | 187.56 | 20.3/km^{2} |
| Puntarenas | Buenos Aires | Potrero Grande | 60303 | 5,956 | 5,162 | +15.4% | 626.4 | 9.5/km^{2} |
| Puntarenas | Buenos Aires | Boruca | 60304 | 3,074 | 2,870 | +7.1% | 125.02 | 24.6/km^{2} |
| Puntarenas | Buenos Aires | Pilas | 60305 | 1,659 | 1,575 | +5.3% | 114.81 | 14.4/km^{2} |
| Puntarenas | Buenos Aires | Colinas | 60306 | 1,371 | 1,435 | −4.5% | 129.07 | 10.6/km^{2} |
| Puntarenas | Buenos Aires | Chánguena | 60307 | 2,631 | 2,715 | −3.1% | 273.2 | 9.6/km^{2} |
| Puntarenas | Buenos Aires | Biolley | 60308 | 2,455 | 3,068 | −20.0% | 208.71 | 11.8/km^{2} |
| Puntarenas | Buenos Aires | Brunka | 60309 | 3,220 | 3,220 | 0.0% | 162.96 | 19.8/km^{2} |
| Puntarenas | Montes de Oro | Miramar | 60401 | 8,298 | 6,842 | +21.3% | 110.64 | 75.0/km^{2} |
| Puntarenas | Montes de Oro | La Unión | 60402 | 1,249 | 1,464 | −14.7% | 78.33 | 15.9/km^{2} |
| Puntarenas | Montes de Oro | San Isidro | 60403 | 3,403 | 2,853 | +19.3% | 57.87 | 58.8/km^{2} |
| Puntarenas | Osa | Puerto Cortés | 60501 | 7,969 | 6,295 | +26.6% | 230.98 | 34.5/km^{2} |
| Puntarenas | Osa | Palmar | 60502 | 9,815 | 9,906 | −0.9% | 250.72 | 39.1/km^{2} |
| Puntarenas | Osa | Sierpe | 60503 | 4,205 | 4,124 | +2.0% | 631.15 | 6.7/km^{2} |
| Puntarenas | Osa | Bahía Ballena | 60504 | 3,306 | 1,990 | +66.1% | 160.39 | 20.6/km^{2} |
| Puntarenas | Osa | Piedras Blancas | 60505 | 4,138 | 3,546 | +16.7% | 263.27 | 15.7/km^{2} |
| Puntarenas | Osa | Bahía Drake | 60506 | | | NA | 393.39 | |
| Puntarenas | Quepos | Quepos | 60601 | 19,858 | 14,925 | +33.1% | 235.81 | 84.2/km^{2} |
| Puntarenas | Quepos | Savegre | 60602 | 3,326 | 2,787 | +19.3% | 216.07 | 15.4/km^{2} |
| Puntarenas | Quepos | Naranjito | 60603 | 3,677 | 2,476 | +48.5% | 104.68 | 35.1/km^{2} |
| Puntarenas | Golfito | Golfito | 60701 | 11,284 | 10,915 | +3.4% | 357.32 | 31.6/km^{2} |
| Puntarenas | Golfito | Guaycará | 60703 | 12,918 | 11,456 | +12.8% | 323.11 | 40.0/km^{2} |
| Puntarenas | Golfito | Pavón | 60704 | 6,159 | 5,350 | +15.1% | 353.26 | 17.4/km^{2} |
| Puntarenas | Coto Brus | San Vito | 60801 | 14,834 | 15,531 | −4.5% | 74.88 | 198.1/km^{2} |
| Puntarenas | Coto Brus | Sabalito | 60802 | 10,984 | 11,084 | −0.9% | 186.82 | 58.8/km^{2} |
| Puntarenas | Coto Brus | Aguabuena | 60803 | 6,286 | 6,962 | −9.7% | 63.75 | 98.6/km^{2} |
| Puntarenas | Coto Brus | Limoncito | 60804 | 3,591 | 3,448 | +4.1% | 124.04 | 29.0/km^{2} |
| Puntarenas | Coto Brus | Pittier | 60805 | 2,758 | 3,057 | −9.8% | 255.23 | 10.8/km^{2} |
| Puntarenas | Coto Brus | Gutiérrez Braun | 60806 | | | NA | 238.38 | |
| Puntarenas | Parrita | Parrita | 60901 | 16,115 | 12,112 | +33.0% | 480.44 | 33.5/km^{2} |
| Puntarenas | Corredores | Corredor | 61001 | 17,250 | 16,718 | +3.2% | 276.37 | 62.4/km^{2} |
| Puntarenas | Corredores | La Cuesta | 61002 | 3,906 | 3,623 | +7.8% | 37.06 | 105.4/km^{2} |
| Puntarenas | Corredores | Canoas | 61003 | 11,527 | 8,464 | +36.2% | 122.54 | 94.1/km^{2} |
| Puntarenas | Corredores | Laurel | 61004 | 9,148 | 8,469 | +8.0% | 188.38 | 48.6/km^{2} |
| Puntarenas | Garabito | Jacó | 61101 | 11,685 | 6,371 | +83.4% | 141.11 | 82.8/km^{2} |
| Puntarenas | Garabito | Tárcoles | 61102 | 5,544 | 4,007 | +38.4% | 172.87 | 32.1/km^{2} |
| Puntarenas | Monteverde | Monteverde | 61201 | 4,155 | 3,285 | +26.5% | 53.05 | 78.3/km^{2} |
| Puntarenas | Puerto Jiménez | Puerto Jiménez | 61301 | 8,789 | 6,102 | +44.0% | 722.56 | 12.2/km^{2} |
| Limón | Limón | Limón | 70101 | 61,072 | 60,298 | +1.3% | 59.51 | 1,026.2/km^{2} |
| Limón | Limón | Valle La Estrella | 70102 | 17,908 | 16,907 | +5.9% | 1,238.66 | 14.5/km^{2} |
| Limón | Limón | Río Blanco | 70103 | 8,307 | 6,318 | +31.5% | 131.29 | 63.3/km^{2} |
| Limón | Limón | Matama | 70104 | 7,128 | 6,410 | +11.2% | 339.13 | 21.0/km^{2} |
| Limón | Pococí | Guápiles | 70201 | 36,469 | 27,368 | +33.3% | 222.63 | 163.8/km^{2} |
| Limón | Pococí | Jiménez | 70202 | 10,501 | 6,644 | +58.1% | 109.44 | 96.0/km^{2} |
| Limón | Pococí | Rita | 70203 | 24,041 | 21,841 | +10.1% | 502.39 | 47.9/km^{2} |
| Limón | Pococí | Roxana | 70204 | 16,790 | 15,706 | +6.9% | 175.67 | 95.6/km^{2} |
| Limón | Pococí | Cariari | 70205 | 34,176 | 28,080 | +21.7% | 200.96 | 170.1/km^{2} |
| Limón | Pococí | Colorado | 70206 | 3,985 | 3,482 | +14.4% | 1,158.91 | 3.4/km^{2} |
| Limón | Pococí | La Colonia | 70207 | | | NA | 39.1 | |
| Limón | Siquirres | Siquirres | 70301 | 31,637 | 31,358 | +0.9% | 373.27 | 84.8/km^{2} |
| Limón | Siquirres | Pacuarito | 70302 | 8,756 | 8,707 | +0.6% | 219.43 | 39.9/km^{2} |
| Limón | Siquirres | Florida | 70303 | 2,184 | 1,964 | +11.2% | 82.76 | 26.4/km^{2} |
| Limón | Siquirres | Germania | 70304 | 2,471 | 2,425 | +1.9% | 33.98 | 72.7/km^{2} |
| Limón | Siquirres | El Cairo | 70305 | 6,082 | 4,355 | +39.7% | 107.2 | 56.7/km^{2} |
| Limón | Siquirres | Alegría | 70306 | 5,656 | 3,600 | +57.1% | 37.73 | 149.9/km^{2} |
| Limón | Siquirres | Reventazón | 70307 | | | NA | | |
| Limón | Talamanca | Bratsi | 70401 | 7,318 | 10,292 | −28.9% | 180.44 | 40.6/km^{2} |
| Limón | Talamanca | Sixaola | 70402 | 8,861 | 10,234 | −13.4% | 169.32 | 52.3/km^{2} |
| Limón | Talamanca | Cahuita | 70403 | 8,293 | 5,331 | +55.6% | 234.6 | 35.3/km^{2} |
| Limón | Talamanca | Telire | 70404 | 6,240 | 6,240 | 0.0% | 2,229.73 | 2.8/km^{2} |
| Limón | Matina | Matina | 70501 | 9,142 | 8,729 | +4.7% | 351.75 | 26.0/km^{2} |
| Limón | Matina | Batán | 70502 | 16,532 | 14,546 | +13.7% | 213.69 | 77.4/km^{2} |
| Limón | Matina | Carrandi | 70503 | 12,047 | 9,821 | +22.7% | 205.99 | 58.5/km^{2} |
| Limón | Guácimo | Guácimo | 70601 | 18,326 | 13,950 | +31.4% | 223.27 | 82.1/km^{2} |
| Limón | Guácimo | Mercedes | 70602 | 1,707 | 1,673 | +2.0% | 90.43 | 18.9/km^{2} |
| Limón | Guácimo | Pocora | 70603 | 6,432 | 5,750 | +11.9% | 72.7 | 88.5/km^{2} |
| Limón | Guácimo | Río Jiménez | 70604 | 8,742 | 7,906 | +10.6% | 113.59 | 77.0/km^{2} |
| Limón | Guácimo | Duacarí | 70605 | 6,059 | 5,600 | +8.2% | 81.36 | 74.5/km^{2} |

== Notes ==
1. The Zarcero canton was previously known as Alfaro Ruiz.
2. The Sarchí canton was previously known as Valverde Vega.
3. Río Cuarto district became a canton in 2017, the old postal code was 20306.
4. Santa Rita, Santa Isabel, Reventazón, and Cabeceras do not have a postal code assigned yet as of June 2020, but the current INEC code will be assigned as such.

== See also ==
- Provinces of Costa Rica
- Cantons of Costa Rica
