= Piedades Sur =

District in San Ramón canton, Alajuela province, Costa Rica

- District
- Piedades Sur district
- Piedades Sur district location in Costa Rica
- Coordinates: 10.097508°N 84.5688713°W
- Country: Costa Rica
- Province: Alajuela
- Canton: San Ramón

Area
  - Total: 116.29 km^{2} (44.90 sq mi)
- Elevation: 1,013 m (3,323 ft)

Population (2011)
  - Total: 3,738
  - Density: 32.14/km^{2} (83.25/sq mi)
- Time zone: UTC−06:00
- Postal code: 20205

Piedades Sur is a district of the San Ramón canton, in the Alajuela province of Costa Rica.

== Geography ==
Piedades Sur has an area of 116.29 km^{2} and an elevation of 1,013 metres.

== Demographics ==
Historical population
Census	Pop.	±% p.a.
1883	749	—
1892	1,080	+4.15%
1927	1,852	+1.55%
1950	2,198	+0.75%
1963	2,341	+0.49%
1973	2,311	−0.13%
1984	2,339	+0.11%
2000	3,448	+2.46%
2011	3,738	+0.74%
2022	4,187	+1.04%
Source: Instituto Nacional de Estadística y Censos; Centro Centroamericano de Población

For the 2011 census, Piedades Sur had a population of 3,738 inhabitants.

== Transportation ==
=== Road transportation ===
The district is covered by the following road routes:

- National Route 742
