= San Rafael District, Esparza =

District in Esparza canton, Puntarenas province, Costa Rica

San Rafael
- District
- San Rafael district
- San Rafael district location in Costa Rica
- Coordinates: 9.9844585°N 84.6066374°W
- Country: Costa Rica
- Province: Puntarenas
- Canton: Esparza

Area
  - Total: 34.35 km^{2} (13.26 sq mi)
- Elevation: 247 m (810 ft)

Population (2011)
  - Total: 1,294
  - Density: 37.67/km^{2} (97.57/sq mi)
- Time zone: UTC−06:00
- Postal code: 60204

San Rafael is a district of the Esparza canton, in the Puntarenas province of Costa Rica.

== Geography ==
San Rafael has an area of 34.35 km^{2} (13.26 sq mi) and an elevation of 247 metres.

== Demographics ==
Historical population
Census	Pop.	±% p.a.
1883	547	—
1892	507	−0.84%
1927	862	+1.53%
1950	1,095	+1.05%
1963	770	−2.67%
1973	811	+0.52%
1984	1,041	+2.30%
2000	1,135	+0.54%
2011	1,294	+1.20%
2022	1,264	−0.21%
Source: Instituto Nacional de Estadística y Censos; Centro Centroamericano de Población

For the 2011 census, San Rafael had a population of 1,294 inhabitants.

== Transportation ==
=== Road transportation ===
The district is covered by the following road routes:

- National Route 131
- National Route 756
