= Espíritu Santo District =

District in Esparza canton, Puntarenas province, Costa Rica

Espíritu Santo
- District
- Interactive map of Espíritu Santo
- Espíritu Santo district location in Costa Rica
- Coordinates: 9.9902704°N 84.6848859°W
- Country: Costa Rica
- Province: Puntarenas
- Canton: Esparza

Area
  - Total: 18.95 km^{2} (7.32 sq mi)
- Elevation: 208 m (682 ft)

Population (2011)
  - Total: 15,686
  - Density: 827.8/km^{2} (2,144/sq mi)
- Time zone: UTC−06:00
- Postal code: 60201

Espíritu Santo is a district of the Esparza canton, in the Puntarenas province of Costa Rica.

== Geography ==
Espíritu Santo has an area of 18.95 km^{2} and an elevation of 208 metres.

== Demographics ==
Historical population
Census	Pop.	±% p.a.
1864	679	—
1883	745	+0.49%
1892	1,245	+5.87%
1927	2,067	+1.46%
1950	2,758	+1.26%
1963	4,895	+4.51%
1973	6,686	+3.17%
1984	9,649	+3.39%
2000	15,842	+3.15%
2011	15,686	−0.09%
2022	15,028	−0.39%
Source: Instituto Nacional de Estadística y Censos; Centro Centroamericano de Población

For the 2011 census, Espíritu Santo had a population of 15,686 inhabitants.

== Transportation ==
=== Road transportation ===
The district is covered by the following road routes:

- National Route 1
- National Route 131
- National Route 622
