= National Route 622 (Costa Rica) =

National Road Route in Costa Rica

National Tertiary Route 622
- Ruta nacional terciaria 622

Route information
- Maintained by Ministry of Public Works and Transport
- Length: 13.590 km (8.444 mi)

Location
- Country: Costa Rica
- Provinces: Puntarenas

Highway system
- National Road Network of Costa Rica
← Route 621	→ Route 623

National Tertiary Route 622, or just Route 622 (Spanish: Ruta Nacional Terciaria 622, or Ruta 622) is a National Road Route of Costa Rica, located in the Puntarenas province.

== Description ==
In Puntarenas province the route covers Esparza canton (Espíritu Santo, San Juan Grande, Caldera districts).
