= Desmonte =

District in Alajuela province, Costa Rica

- District
- Interactive map of Desmonte
- Desmonte district location in Costa Rica
- Coordinates: 9.9646106°N 84.4824219°W
- Country: Costa Rica
- Province: Alajuela
- Canton: San Mateo

Area
  - Total: 20.19 km^{2} (7.80 sq mi)
- Elevation: 567 m (1,860 ft)

Population (2011)
  - Total: 1,047
  - Density: 51.86/km^{2} (134.3/sq mi)
- Time zone: UTC−06:00
- Postal code: 20402

Desmonte is a district of the San Mateo canton, in the Alajuela province of Costa Rica.

== Geography ==
Desmonte has an area of 20.19 km^{2} (7.80 sq mi) and an elevation of 567 metres (1,860 ft).

== Demographics ==
Historical population
Census	Pop.	±% p.a.
1883	341	—
1892	461	+3.41%
1927	1,054	+2.39%
1950	553	−2.77%
1963	512	−0.59%
1973	455	−1.17%
1984	651	+3.31%
2000	871	+1.84%
2011	1,047	+1.69%
2022	1,003	−0.39%
Source: Instituto Nacional de Estadística y Censos; Centro Centroamericano de Población

For the 2011 census, Desmonte had a population of 1,047 inhabitants.

== Transportation ==
=== Road transportation ===
The district is covered by the following road routes:

- National Route 3
- National Route 713
