= Santiago District, San Ramón =

District in San Ramón canton, Alajuela province, Costa Rica

Santiago
- District
- Santiago district
- Santiago district location in Costa Rica
- Coordinates: 10.0380278°N 84.5411902°W
- Country: Costa Rica
- Province: Alajuela
- Canton: San Ramón

Area
  - Total: 61 km^{2} (24 sq mi)
- Elevation: 1,130 m (3,710 ft)

Population (2011)
  - Total: 4,535
  - Density: 74/km^{2} (190/sq mi)
- Time zone: UTC−06:00
- Postal code: 20202

Santiago is a district of the San Ramón canton, in the Alajuela province of Costa Rica.

== Geography ==
Santiago has an area of 61 km^{2} and an elevation of 1,130 metres.

== Demographics ==
Historical population
Census	Pop.	±% p.a.
1864	690	—
1883	425	−2.52%
1892	522	+2.31%
1927	1,472	+3.01%
1950	1,322	−0.47%
1963	1,481	+0.88%
1973	1,653	+1.10%
1984	1,798	+0.77%
2000	3,976	+5.09%
2011	4,535	+1.20%
2022	6,544	+3.39%
Source: Instituto Nacional de Estadística y Censos; Centro Centroamericano de Población

For the 2011 census, Santiago had a population of 4,535 inhabitants.

== Transportation ==
=== Road transportation ===
The district is covered by the following road routes:

- National Route 1
- National Route 756
