= Caldera District, Esparza =

District in Esparza canton, Puntarenas province, Costa Rica

Caldera
- District
- Interactive map of Caldera
- Caldera district location in Costa Rica
- Coordinates: 9.9196344°N 84.6966013°W
- Country: Costa Rica
- Province: Puntarenas
- Canton: Esparza
- Creation: 7 April 2014

Area
  - Total: 62.01 km^{2} (23.94 sq mi)
- Elevation: 7 m (23 ft)
- Time zone: UTC−06:00
- Postal code: 60206

Caldera is a district of the Esparza canton, in the Puntarenas province of Costa Rica.

== History ==
Caldera was created on 7 April 2014 by Ley 9235.

== Geography ==
Caldera has an area of 62.01 km^{2} (23.94 sq mi) and an elevation of 7 metres.

== Demographics ==
Historical population
Census	Pop.	±% p.a.
2022	3,885	—
Source: Instituto Nacional de Estadística y Censos; Centro Centroamericano de Población

For the 2011 census, Caldera had not been created, no census data is available until 2021.

== Transportation ==
=== Road transportation ===
The district is covered by the following road routes:

- National Route 23
- National Route 27
- National Route 622
- National Route 755
