= San Ramón (canton) =

Canton in Alajuela province, Costa Rica

- Canton
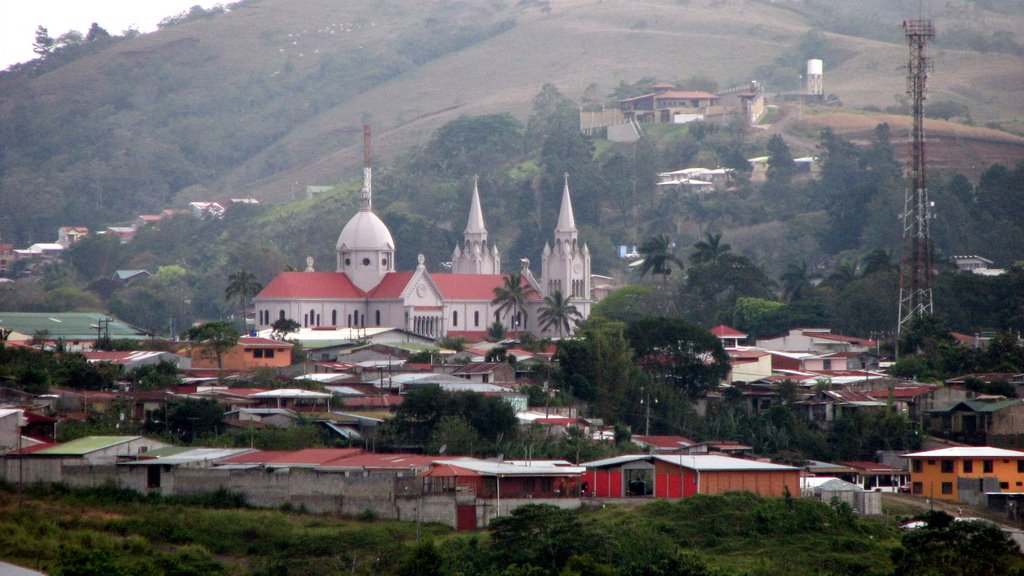
- View of San Ramón

- Flag Seal
- Nicknames: Tierra de Poetas (Land of Poets)
- San Ramón canton
- San Ramón canton location in Alajuela Province San Ramón canton location in Costa Rica
- Coordinates: 10.2182301°N 84.5992384°W
- Country: Costa Rica
- Province: Alajuela
- Creation: 21 August 1856
- Head city: San Ramón
- Districts: Districts: San Ramón; Santiago; San Juan; Piedades Norte; Piedades Sur; San Rafael; San Isidro; Los Ángeles; Alfaro; Volio; Concepción; Zapotal; Peñas Blancas; San Lorenzo

Government
  - Type: Municipality
  - Body: Municipalidad de San Ramón

Area
  - Total: 1,018.64 km^{2} (393.30 sq mi)
- Elevation: 974 m (3,196 ft)

Population (2011)
  - Total: 80,566
  - Density: 79.092/km^{2} (204.85/sq mi)
- Time zone: UTC−06:00
- Canton code: 202
- Website: {{URL|example.com|optional display text}}

San Ramón is a canton (administrative district, similar to "County") in the Alajuela province of Costa Rica. The head city is in San Ramón district.

== History ==
San Ramón was created on 21 August 1856 by decree 17.

== Geography ==
San Ramón has an area of 1,018.64 km^{2} (393.30 sq mi) and a mean elevation of 974 metres.

An oddly-shaped canton, San Ramon stretches north through the eastern heights of the Cordillera de Tilarán, looking down on the Central Valley (Valle Central) to its east. The canton forms the border with the province of Guanacaste to the west.

== Districts ==
The canton of San Ramón is subdivided into the following districts:

1. San Ramón
2. Santiago
3. San Juan
4. Piedades Norte
5. Piedades Sur
6. San Rafael
7. San Isidro
8. Los Ángeles
9. Alfaro
10. Volio
11. Concepción
12. Zapotal
13. Peñas Blancas
14. San Lorenzo

== Demographics ==
Historical population
Census	Pop.	±% p.a.
1864	5,045	—
1883	10,111	+3.73%
1892	9,928	−0.20%
1927	13,805	+0.95%
1950	19,951	+1.61%
1963	25,925	+2.04%
1973	33,155	+2.49%
1984	39,963	+1.71%
2000	67,975	+3.38%
2011	80,566	+1.56%
2022	93,264	+1.34%
Source: Instituto Nacional de Estadística y Censos; Centro Centroamericano de Población

For the 2011 census, San Ramón had a population of 80,566 inhabitants.

For the 2022 census, San Ramón had a population of 93,264 inhabitants, demonstrating the canton's steady growth.

== Transportation ==
=== Road transportation ===
The canton is covered by the following road routes:

- National Route 1
- National Route 135
- National Route 156
- National Route 169
- National Route 702
- National Route 703
- National Route 704
- National Route 705
- National Route 713
- National Route 714
- National Route 725
- National Route 739
- National Route 742
- National Route 756
- National Route 936
