= San José District, Naranjo =

District in Naranjo canton, Alajuela province, Costa Rica

San José
- District
- San José district
- San José district location in Costa Rica
- Coordinates: 10.1504841°N 84.4052115°W
- Country: Costa Rica
- Province: Alajuela
- Canton: Naranjo

Area
  - Total: 21.12 km^{2} (8.15 sq mi)
- Elevation: 1,500 m (4,900 ft)

Population (2011)
  - Total: 3,162
  - Density: 149.7/km^{2} (387.8/sq mi)
- Time zone: UTC−06:00
- Postal code: 20603

San José is a district of the Naranjo canton, in the Alajuela province of Costa Rica. The village of San Juanillo is located in the district.

== Geography ==
San José has an area of 21.12 km^{2} and an elevation of 1,500 metres.

== Demographics ==
Historical population
Census	Pop.	±% p.a.
1927	1,272	—
1950	1,476	+0.65%
1963	1,862	+1.80%
1973	1,763	−0.54%
1984	2,173	+1.92%
2000	3,225	+2.50%
2011	3,162	−0.18%
2022	3,206	+0.13%
Source: Instituto Nacional de Estadística y Censos; Centro Centroamericano de Población

For the 2011 census, San José had a population of 3,162 inhabitants.

== Transportation ==
=== Road transportation ===
The district is covered by the following road routes:

- National Route 141
- National Route 703
- National Route 704
