= San Jerónimo District, Esparza =

District in Esparza canton, Puntarenas province, Costa Rica

San Jerónimo
- District
- San Jerónimo district
- San Jerónimo district location in Costa Rica
- Coordinates: 10.0715673°N 84.6556138°W
- Country: Costa Rica
- Province: Puntarenas
- Canton: Esparza

Area
  - Total: 49.95 km^{2} (19.29 sq mi)
- Elevation: 260 m (850 ft)

Population (2011)
  - Total: 751
  - Density: 15.0/km^{2} (38.9/sq mi)
- Time zone: UTC−06:00
- Postal code: 60205

San Jerónimo is a district of the Esparza canton, in the Puntarenas province of Costa Rica.

== Geography ==
San Jerónimo has an area of 49.95 km^{2} and an elevation of 260 metres.

== Demographics ==
Historical population
Census	Pop.	±% p.a.
1883	505	—
1927	947	+1.44%
1950	1,309	+1.42%
1963	1,040	−1.75%
1973	828	−2.25%
1984	782	−0.52%
2000	773	−0.07%
2011	751	−0.26%
2022	938	+2.04%
Source: Instituto Nacional de Estadística y Censos; Centro Centroamericano de Población

For the 2011 census, San Jerónimo had a population of 751 inhabitants.

== Transportation ==
=== Road transportation ===
The district is covered by the following road routes:

- National Route 742
