= Macacona =

District in Esparza canton, Puntarenas province, Costa Rica

- District
- Interactive map of Macacona
- Macacona district location in Costa Rica
- Coordinates: 10.0158023°N 84.6161576°W
- Country: Costa Rica
- Province: Puntarenas
- Canton: Esparza

Area
  - Total: 33.51 km^{2} (12.94 sq mi)
- Elevation: 243 m (797 ft)

Population (2011)
  - Total: 4,742
  - Density: 141.5/km^{2} (366.5/sq mi)
- Time zone: UTC−06:00
- Postal code: 60203

Macacona is a district of the Esparza canton, in the Puntarenas province of Costa Rica.

== Geography ==
Macacona has an area of 33.51 km^{2} (12.94 sq mi) and an elevation of 243 metres.

== Demographics ==
Historical population
Census	Pop.	±% p.a.
1883	164	—
1892	244	+4.51%
1927	683	+2.98%
1950	752	+0.42%
1963	1,210	+3.73%
1973	2,305	+6.66%
1984	1,947	−1.52%
2000	2,776	+2.24%
2011	4,742	+4.99%
2022	8,149	+5.05%
Source: Instituto Nacional de Estadística y Censos; Centro Centroamericano de Población

For the 2011 census, Macacona had a population of 4,742 inhabitants.

== Transportation ==
=== Road transportation ===
The district is covered by the following road routes:

- National Route 1
- National Route 131
- National Route 742
