= San Mateo (canton) =

Canton in Alajuela province, Costa Rica

- Canton
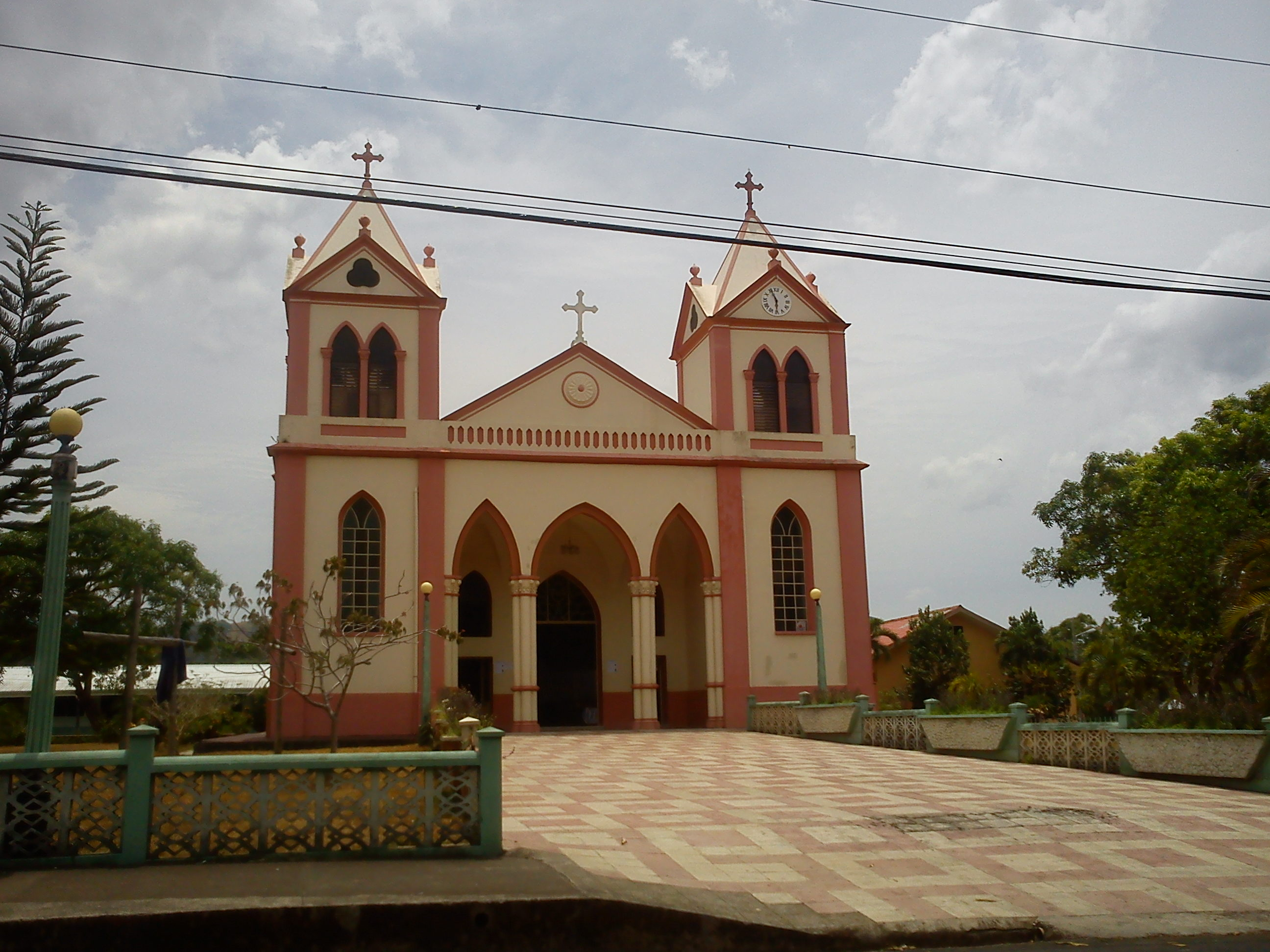
- San Mateo Church

- Flag
- San Mateo canton
- San Mateo canton location in Alajuela Province San Mateo canton location in Costa Rica
- Coordinates: 9.9605539°N 84.560288°W
- Country: Costa Rica
- Province: Alajuela
- Creation: 7 August 1868
- Head city: San Mateo
- Districts: Districts: San Mateo; Desmonte; Jesús María; Labrador

Government
  - Type: Municipality
  - Body: Municipalidad de San Mateo

Area
  - Total: 125.9 km^{2} (48.6 sq mi)
- Elevation: 311 m (1,020 ft)

Population (2011)
  - Total: 6,136
  - Density: 48.74/km^{2} (126.2/sq mi)
- Time zone: UTC−06:00
- Canton code: 204
- Website: {{URL|example.com|optional display text}}

San Mateo is a canton in the Alajuela province of Costa Rica. The head city is in San Mateo district.

== History ==
San Mateo was created on 7 August 1868 by decree 30.

== Geography ==
San Mateo has an area of 125.9 km^{2} (48.6 sq mi) and a mean elevation of 311 metres.

The northern border of the elongated province is formed by the Jesús María, Machuca, Agua Agría, Calera rivers and Quebrada Zapote. The Quebrada Concepción, Grande de Tárcoles and the Machuca rivers establish the southern border. Cerro La Lana is a landmark that delineates a northeast tip of the canton.

== Districts ==
The canton of San Mateo is subdivided into the following districts:

1. San Mateo
2. Desmonte
3. Jesús María
4. Labrador

== Demographics ==
Historical population
Census	Pop.	±% p.a.
1864	1,682	—
1883	2,525	+2.16%
1892	3,353	+3.20%
1927	3,234	−0.10%
1950	3,611	+0.48%
1963	3,388	−0.49%
1973	2,969	−1.31%
1984	3,783	+2.23%
2000	5,343	+2.18%
2011	6,136	+1.27%
2022	6,952	+1.14%
Source: Instituto Nacional de Estadística y Censos; Centro Centroamericano de Población

For the 2011 census, San Mateo had a population of 6,136 inhabitants.

== Transportation ==
=== Road transportation ===
The canton is covered by the following road routes:

- National Route 3
- National Route 131
- National Route 713
- National Route 755
