= National Route 702 (Costa Rica) =

National Road Route in Costa Rica

National Tertiary Route 702
- Ruta nacional terciaria 702

Route information
- Maintained by Ministry of Public Works and Transport
- Length: 71.310 km (44.310 mi)

Location
- Country: Costa Rica
- Provinces: Alajuela

Highway system
- National Road Network of Costa Rica
← Route 700	→ Route 703

National Tertiary Route 702, or just Route 702 (Spanish: Ruta Nacional Terciaria 702, or Ruta 702) is a National Road Route of Costa Rica, located in the Alajuela province.

== Description ==
In Alajuela province the route covers San Ramón canton (San Ramón, Piedades Norte, Los Ángeles, Peñas Blancas, San Lorenzo districts) and San Carlos canton (La Fortuna, La Tigra districts).
