= Zapotal =

District in San Ramón canton, Alajuela province, Costa Rica

- District
- Zapotal district
- Zapotal district location in Costa Rica
- Coordinates: 10.1351307°N 84.6354397°W
- Country: Costa Rica
- Province: Alajuela
- Canton: San Ramón

Area
  - Total: 67.24 km^{2} (25.96 sq mi)
- Elevation: 1,033 m (3,389 ft)

Population (2011)
  - Total: 391
  - Density: 5.81/km^{2} (15.1/sq mi)
- Time zone: UTC−06:00
- Postal code: 20212

Zapotal is a district of the San Ramón canton, in the Alajuela province of Costa Rica.

== Geography ==
Zapotal has an area of 67.24 km^{2} and an elevation of 1,033 metres.

== Demographics ==
Historical population
Census	Pop.	±% p.a.
1927	624	—
1950	770	+0.92%
1963	815	+0.44%
1973	700	−1.51%
1984	490	−3.19%
2000	463	−0.35%
2011	391	−1.52%
2022	641	+4.60%
Source: Instituto Nacional de Estadística y Censos; Centro Centroamericano de Población

For the 2011 census, Zapotal had a population of 391 inhabitants.

== Transportation ==
=== Road transportation ===
The district is covered by the following road routes:

- National Route 742
