= National Route 755 (Costa Rica) =

National Road Route in Costa Rica

National Tertiary Route 755
- Ruta nacional terciaria 755

Route information
- Maintained by Ministry of Public Works and Transport
- Length: 11.175 km (6.944 mi)

Location
- Country: Costa Rica
- Provinces: Alajuela, Puntarenas

Highway system
- National Road Network of Costa Rica
← Route 753	→ Route 756

National Tertiary Route 755, or just Route 755 (Spanish: Ruta Nacional Terciaria 755, or Ruta 755) is a National Road Route of Costa Rica, located in the Alajuela, Puntarenas provinces.

== Description ==
In Alajuela province the route covers San Mateo canton (Labrador district).

In Puntarenas province the route covers Esparza canton (Caldera district).
