= National Route 704 (Costa Rica) =

National Road Route in Costa Rica

National Tertiary Route 704
- Ruta nacional terciaria 704

Route information
- Maintained by Ministry of Public Works and Transport
- Length: 12.165 km (7.559 mi)

Location
- Country: Costa Rica
- Provinces: Alajuela

Highway system
- National Road Network of Costa Rica
← Route 703	→ Route 705

National Tertiary Route 704, or just Route 704 (Spanish: Ruta Nacional Terciaria 704, or Ruta 704) is a National Road Route of Costa Rica, located in the Alajuela province.

== Description ==
In Alajuela province the route covers San Ramón canton (San Juan and Concepción districts) and Naranjo canton (San José district).
