= San Juan Grande =

District in Esparza canton, Puntarenas province, Costa Rica

- District
- San Juan Grande district
- San Juan Grande district location in Costa Rica
- Coordinates: 9.9703647°N 84.6533508°W
- Country: Costa Rica
- Province: Puntarenas
- Canton: Esparza

Area
  - Total: 18.7 km^{2} (7.2 sq mi)
- Elevation: 224 m (735 ft)

Population (2011)
  - Total: 6,171
  - Density: 330/km^{2} (855/sq mi)
- Time zone: UTC−06:00
- Postal code: 60202

San Juan Grande is a district of the Esparza canton, in the Puntarenas province of Costa Rica.

== Geography ==
San Juan Grande has an area of 18.7 km^{2} (7.2 sq mi) and an elevation of 224 metres.

== Demographics ==
Historical population
| Census | Pop. | ±% p.a. |
|---|---|---|
| 1883 | 134 | — |
| 1892 | 172 | +2.81% |
| 1927 | 755 | +4.32% |
| 1950 | 988 | +1.18% |
| 1963 | 1,260 | +1.89% |
| 1973 | 1,465 | +1.52% |
| 1984 | 1,579 | +0.68% |
| 2000 | 3,437 | +4.98% |
| 2011 | 6,171 | +5.46% |
| 2022 | 5,544 | −0.97% |
Source: Instituto Nacional de Estadística y Censos; Centro Centroamericano de Población

For the 2011 census, San Juan Grande had a population of 6,171 inhabitants.

== Transportation ==
=== Road transportation ===
The district is covered by the following road routes:

- National Route 131
- National Route 622
