= Concepción District, San Ramón =

District in San Ramón canton, Alajuela province, Costa Rica

Concepción
- District
- Interactive map of Concepción
- Concepción district location in Costa Rica
- Coordinates: 10.1266981°N 84.433767°W
- Country: Costa Rica
- Province: Alajuela
- Canton: San Ramón

Area
  - Total: 9.49 km^{2} (3.66 sq mi)
- Elevation: 1,155 m (3,789 ft)

Population (2011)
  - Total: 2,348
  - Density: 247/km^{2} (641/sq mi)
- Time zone: UTC−06:00
- Postal code: 20211

Concepción is a district of the San Ramón canton, in the Alajuela province of Costa Rica.

== Geography ==
Concepción has an area of 9.49 km^{2} and an elevation of 1,155 metres.

== Demographics ==
Historical population
Census	Pop.	±% p.a.
1883	438	—
1892	549	+2.54%
1927	543	−0.03%
1950	571	+0.22%
1963	775	+2.38%
1973	911	+1.63%
1984	1,083	+1.58%
2000	1,841	+3.37%
2011	2,348	+2.24%
2022	3,067	+2.46%
Source: Instituto Nacional de Estadística y Censos; Centro Centroamericano de Población

For the 2011 census, Concepción had a population of 2,348 inhabitants.

== Transportation ==
=== Road transportation ===
The district is covered by the following road routes:

- National Route 704
- National Route 725
