= San Rafael District, San Ramón =

District in San Ramón canton, Alajuela province, Costa Rica

San Rafael
- District
- San Rafael district
- San Rafael district location in Costa Rica
- Coordinates: 10.0313571°N 84.4750817°W
- Country: Costa Rica
- Province: Alajuela
- Canton: San Ramón

Area
  - Total: 30.73 km^{2} (11.86 sq mi)
- Elevation: 1,080 m (3,540 ft)

Population (2011)
  - Total: 9,321
  - Density: 303.3/km^{2} (785.6/sq mi)
- Time zone: UTC−06:00
- Postal code: 20206

San Rafael is a district of the San Ramón canton, in the Alajuela province of Costa Rica.

== Geography ==
San Rafael has an area of 30.73 km^{2} and an elevation of 1,080 metres.

== Demographics ==
Historical population
| Census | Pop. | ±% p.a. |
|---|---|---|
| 1864 | 597 | — |
| 1883 | 1,177 | +3.64% |
| 1892 | 1,217 | +0.37% |
| 1927 | 2,117 | +1.59% |
| 1950 | 2,308 | +0.38% |
| 1963 | 2,921 | +1.83% |
| 1973 | 3,467 | +1.73% |
| 1984 | 4,716 | +2.84% |
| 2000 | 8,384 | +3.66% |
| 2011 | 9,321 | +0.97% |
| 2022 | 10,328 | +0.94% |
Source: Instituto Nacional de Estadística y Censos; Centro Centroamericano de Población

For the 2011 census, San Rafael had a population of 9,321 inhabitants.

== Transportation ==
=== Road transportation ===
The district is covered by the following road routes:

- National Route 1
- National Route 135
- National Route 156
- National Route 703
- National Route 713
- National Route 714
