= National Route 756 (Costa Rica) =

National Road Route in Costa Rica

National Tertiary Route 756
- Ruta nacional terciaria 756

Route information
- Maintained by Ministry of Public Works and Transport
- Length: 9.950 km (6.183 mi)

Location
- Country: Costa Rica
- Provinces: Alajuela, Puntarenas

Highway system
- National Road Network of Costa Rica
← Route 755	→ Route 757

National Tertiary Route 756, or just Route 756 (Spanish: Ruta Nacional Terciaria 756, or Ruta 756) is a National Road Route of Costa Rica, located in the Alajuela, Puntarenas provinces.

== Description ==
In Alajuela province the route covers San Ramón canton (Santiago district).

In Puntarenas province the route covers Esparza canton (San Rafael district).
