= San Juan District, San Ramón =

District in San Ramón canton, Alajuela province, Costa Rica

San Juan
- District
- San Juan district
- San Juan district location in Costa Rica
- Coordinates: 10.1057171°N 84.4618296°W
- Country: Costa Rica
- Province: Alajuela
- Canton: San Ramón

Area
  - Total: 5.09 km^{2} (1.97 sq mi)
- Elevation: 1,085 m (3,560 ft)

Population (2011)
  - Total: 11,695
  - Density: 2,300/km^{2} (5,950/sq mi)
- Time zone: UTC−06:00
- Postal code: 20203

San Juan is a district of the San Ramón canton, in the Alajuela province of Costa Rica.

== Geography ==
San Juan has an area of 5.09 km^{2} and an elevation of 1,085 metres.

== Demographics ==
Historical population
Census	Pop.	±% p.a.
1864	695	—
1883	1,324	+3.45%
1892	1,462	+1.11%
1927	858	−1.51%
1950	795	−0.33%
1963	1,783	+6.41%
1973	3,499	+6.97%
1984	5,757	+4.63%
2000	9,690	+3.31%
2011	11,695	+1.72%
2022	14,956	+2.26%
Source: Instituto Nacional de Estadística y Censos; Centro Centroamericano de Población

For the 2011 census, San Juan had a population of 11,695 inhabitants.

== Transportation ==
=== Road transportation ===
The district is covered by the following road routes:

- National Route 703
- National Route 704
