= Ángeles, San Ramón =

District in San Ramón canton, Alajuela province, Costa Rica

Ángeles
- District
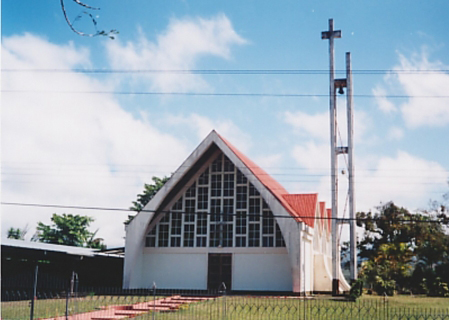
- Ángeles Catholic Church
- Ángeles district
- Ángeles district location in Costa Rica
- Coordinates: 10.1679361°N 84.5209909°W
- Country: Costa Rica
- Province: Alajuela
- Canton: San Ramón

Area
  - Total: 81.41 km^{2} (31.43 sq mi)
- Elevation: 1,111 m (3,645 ft)

Population (2011)
  - Total: 8,500
  - Density: 100/km^{2} (270/sq mi)
- Time zone: UTC−06:00
- Postal code: 20208

Ángeles is a district of the San Ramón canton, in the Alajuela province of Costa Rica.

== Geography ==
Ángeles has an area of 81.41 km^{2} and an elevation of 1,111 metres.

== Demographics ==
Historical population
Census	Pop.	±% p.a.
1892	190	—
1927	724	+3.90%
1950	3,718	+7.37%
1963	2,024	−4.57%
1973	2,267	+1.14%
1984	3,616	+4.34%
2000	7,073	+4.28%
2011	8,500	+1.68%
2022	5,350	−4.12%
Source: Instituto Nacional de Estadística y Censos; Centro Centroamericano de Población

For the 2011 census, Ángeles had a population of 8,500 inhabitants.

== Transportation ==
=== Road transportation ===
The district is covered by the following road routes:

- National Route 702
