= San Mateo de Alajuela =

District in San Mateo canton, Alajuela province, Costa Rica

San Mateo
- District
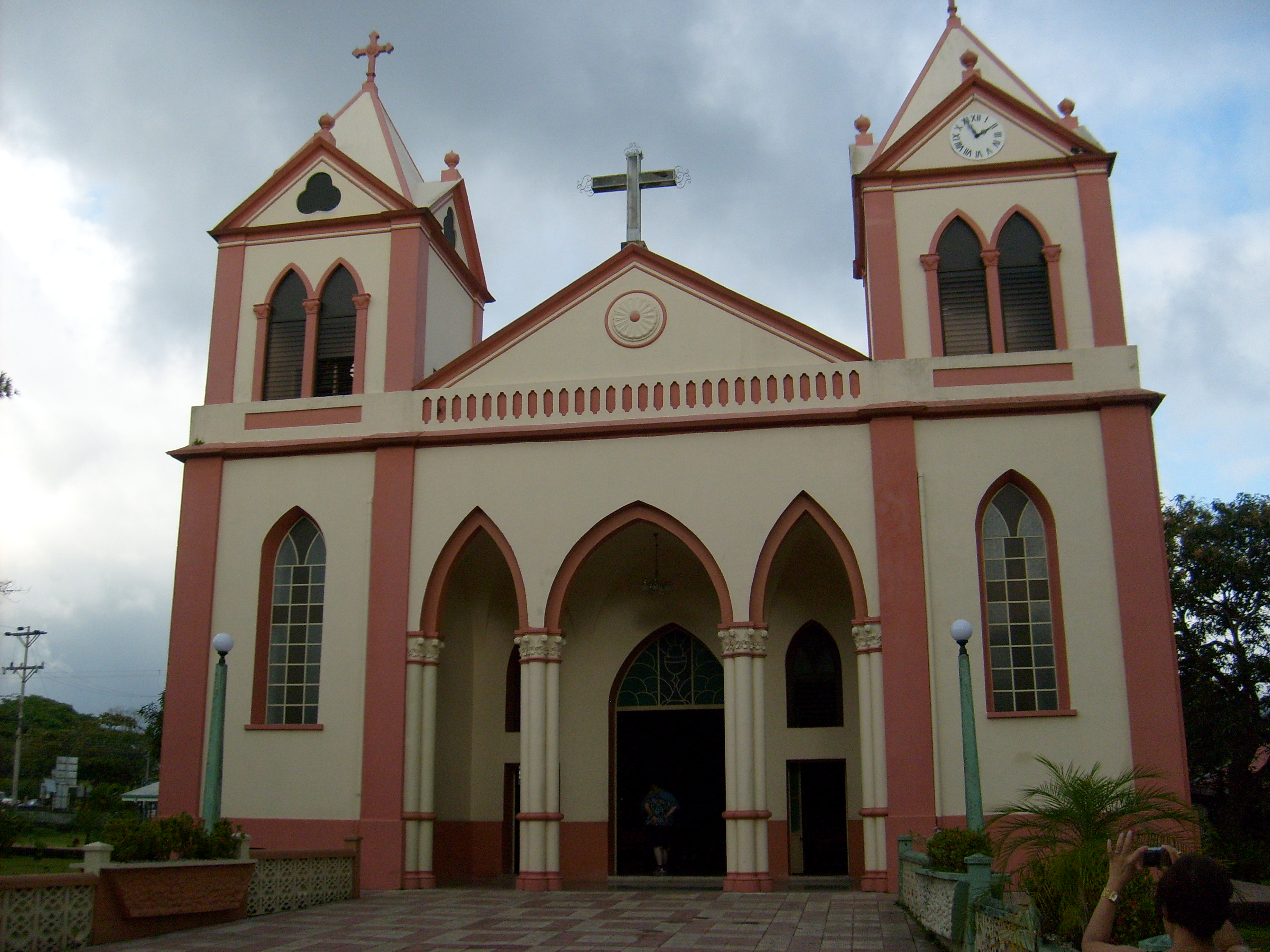
- Front of Catholic Church in San Mateo
- San Mateo district
- San Mateo district location in Costa Rica
- Coordinates: 9.967698°N 84.5381055°W
- Country: Costa Rica
- Province: Alajuela
- Canton: San Mateo

Area
  - Total: 64.85 km^{2} (25.04 sq mi)
- Elevation: 254 m (833 ft)

Population (2011)
  - Total: 2,692
  - Density: 41.51/km^{2} (107.5/sq mi)
- Time zone: UTC−06:00
- Postal code: 20401

San Mateo is a district of the San Mateo canton, in the Alajuela province of Costa Rica.

== Geography ==
San Mateo has an area of 64.85 km^{2} and an elevation of 254 metres. It is located in the coastal lowlands near the central Pacific coast, 31 kilometers east of Caldera Port, 44 kilometers southwest of the provincial capital city of Alajuela and 53 kilometers from the national capital city of San Jose.

== Demographics ==
Historical population
Census	Pop.	±% p.a.
1883	246	—
1892	701	+12.34%
1927	2,180	+3.29%
1950	3,058	+1.48%
1963	2,876	−0.47%
1973	1,553	−5.98%
1984	1,988	+2.27%
2000	2,529	+1.52%
2011	2,692	+0.57%
2022	2,679	−0.04%
Source: Instituto Nacional de Estadística y Censos; Centro Centroamericano de Población

For the 2011 census, San Mateo had a population of 2,692 inhabitants.

== Transportation ==
=== Road transportation ===
The district is covered by the following road routes:

- National Route 3
- National Route 131
