= Esparza (canton) =

Canton in Puntarenas province, Costa Rica

- Canton
- Historic Catholic Church, Esparza

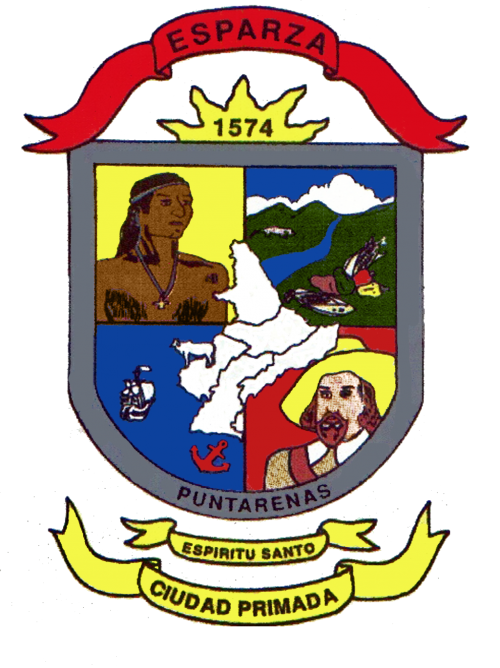
- Flag Seal
- Interactive map of Esparza
- Esparza canton location in Costa Rica
- Coordinates: 9.9958661°N 84.646745°W
- Country: Costa Rica
- Province: Puntarenas
- Creation: 6 November 1851
- Head city: Esparza, Espíritu Santo
- Districts: Districts: Espíritu Santo; San Juan Grande; Macacona; San Rafael; San Jerónimo; Caldera

Government
  - Type: Municipality
  - Body: Municipalidad de Esparza

Area
  - Total: 216.8 km^{2} (83.7 sq mi)
- Elevation: 198 m (650 ft)

Population (2011)
  - Total: 28,644
  - Density: 132.1/km^{2} (342.2/sq mi)
- Time zone: UTC−06:00
- Canton code: 602
- Website: muniesparza.go.cr

Esparza is a canton in the Puntarenas province of Costa Rica. The head city is Esparza in Espíritu Santo district.

== History ==
Esparza was created on 6 November 1851 by decree 39.

The territory of the canton of Esparza was first inhabited by the Chorotega and Huetar cultures. The first belonged to the province of Orotina (one of five Chorotega provinces), ruled by King Gurutiña. The Huetar belonged to the western Huetar kingdom, dominated at the time of the Spanish conquest by King Garabito, or Coyoche, one of the key leaders of the Costa Rican indigenous resistance.

In 1522, Don Gil González Dávila was the first Spanish visitor to the region, journeying from Burica to the indigenous village of Avancari (now Abangaritos, in the canton of Puntarenas).

In 1561, Don Juan de Cavallón y Arboleda, was commissioned by the Royal Audiencia of Guatemala to conquer the province of Nuevo Cartago and Costa Rica. He founded the town of Los Reyes, with the port of Landecho in Tivives Cove, within the Canton of Esparza.

In 1574, Alonso Anguciana de Gamboa, acting governor, relocated citizens of the town of Aranjuez to found the first seat of the city of Espíritu Santo (5 km from the current site of Esparza), in the valley then known as Coyoche, between the Barranca and Jesus Maria rivers, near the present village of Artieda.

There the citizens constructed a small chapel, and shortly afterwards the convent of San Lorenzo, whose first priest was Fray Diego de Guillon. In 1576 the chapel was established within a parish, dedicated to Our Lady of Candelaria. The parish is now suffragan to the diocese of Puntarenas, in the ecclesiastical province of Costa Rica. In 1577 (a year later), the governor of the province, Diego de Artieda y Chirino, established the port of Caldera, replacing Landecho.

Artieda changed the name of the town, adding "Esparza" to the name of the "Ciudad del Espíritu Santo". He did this in memory of his hometown, the village of Esparza, located in the valley of Salazar, in Navarra, Spain, 80 km from the capital of the province, Pamplona. Between 1622 and 1629 the second and final seat of the Ciudad del Espíritu Santo de Esparza was established about five kilometers northwest of its original location. In 1685 the city was sacked by pirates. The following year (1686), pirates burned most of the town, except the church and convent of San Lorenzo. The people were forced to flee inland, taking refuge in Las Cañas and Bagaces.

During the sixteenth and seventeenth centuries the territory of the Ciudad del Espíritu Santo de Esparza extended from the Montes del Aguacate to the rivers Salto and Tempisque. The following territories were under its administrative political jurisdiction:

- Orotina
- San Mateo
- Puntarenas
- Montes de Oro
- Abangares
- Cañas
- Bagaces

In 1821 a small, private, elementary school was established, but only for boys. In 1862 Genoveva Gutierrez opened a small private school for all ages. In 1870, during the second administration of Jesús Jiménez Zamora, the first co-educational public school was opened, and was directed by his wife, Clotilde V. Fernandez de Mora.

From 1870 to 1890 the schoolhouse occupied a building on the north side of the church. The current school was founded in April 1946 and named after Arturo Torres Martinez. In 1965, during the government of Francisco Jose Orlich Bolmarcich, the Liceo Diurno (day high school) opened in Esparza. In 1976 the Liceo Nocturno (night school) was founded. In 2001 the Liceo Emiliano Odio was established. Esparza has a wide range of educational facilities: kindergartens, public schools, and various private colleges; Sancti Spiritus, Manantial de Vida and Santa Sofía College. A campus of the University of Costa Rica (UCR) is soon to open in Nances.

On 4 November 1825, by Law 63, the city of Esparza became part of the district of Cañas in the Western Department, one of two departments into which Costa Rica was divided. On 29 November 1826 Saturnino Lizano Gutiérrez was born in Esparza. He went on to become President of Costa Rica from 5 July to 10 August 1882.

In 1848, Esparza was the second canton in the province of Alajuela. On 6 November 1851, by Executive Order No. 8, this corner of the province of Alajuela was segregated and added to the jurisdiction of the region of Puntarenas.

On 21 March 1834, by Law 59, it was decided to transfer the port of Puntarenas to Caldera. On 26 February 1840, Braulio Carrillo Colina reinstated Puntarenas by decree as a commercial trade port of Costa Rica.

In 1877 the first municipality, composed of Ignacio Pérez (in whose honor the current central city park was named), Felipe Herrera and Marcelino Zuniga, opened. Also in 1877, the first public gas lighting was introduced. In 1921, during the first term of Julio Acosta Garcia, electric bulb lighting was installed.

On 3 September 1879, during the administration of Tomás Guardia Gutiérrez, Decree 93 renamed the town as Esparta. On 6 May 1974, executive decree n.º3752-G-C, restored the name of Esparza to the second canton of Puntarenas province.

In 1912, during the first term of Ricardo Jimenez Oreamuno, piping was installed for potable water.

== Geography ==
Esparza has an area of 216.8 km^{2} and a mean elevation of 198 metres.

The major portion of the canton lies along the coast of the Gulf of Nicoya between the mouths of Río Barranca and the Río Jesús María. An extension of the canton reaches northward from Esparza into the Cordillera de Tilarán.

== Districts ==
The canton of Esparza is subdivided into the following districts:

1. Espíritu Santo
2. San Juan Grande
3. Macacona
4. San Rafael
5. San Jerónimo
6. Caldera

== Demographics ==
Historical population
Census	Pop.	±% p.a.
1883	2,441	—
1892	3,298	+3.40%
1927	5,314	+1.37%
1950	6,902	+1.14%
1963	9,175	+2.21%
1973	12,095	+2.80%
1984	14,998	+1.97%
2000	23,963	+2.97%
2011	28,644	+1.64%
2022	34,808	+1.79%
Source: Instituto Nacional de Estadística y Censos; Centro Centroamericano de Población

For the 2011 census, Esparza had a population of 28,644 inhabitants.

== Transportation ==
=== Road transportation ===
The canton is covered by the following road routes:

- National Route 1
- National Route 23
- National Route 27
- National Route 131
- National Route 622
- National Route 742
- National Route 755
- National Route 756

== Gallery ==
Historic Catholic Church

Casa Cultural

Historic Catholic Church

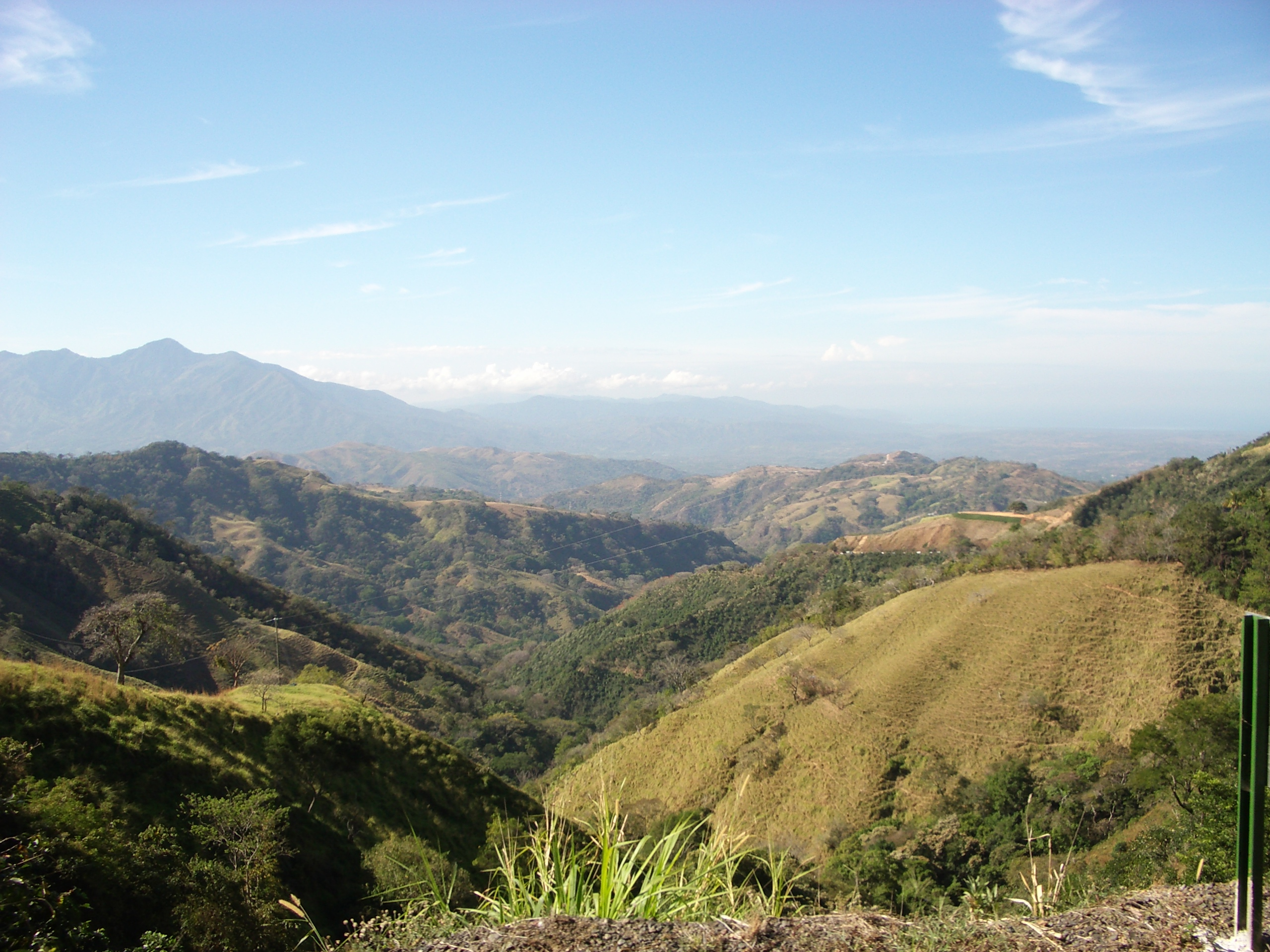
Typical view of Esparza Country

Sunset view from Esparza - Golfo de Nicoya
