= Peñas Blancas District =

District in San Ramón canton, Alajuela province, Costa Rica

Peñas Blancas
- District
- Peñas Blancas district
- Peñas Blancas district location in Costa Rica
- Coordinates: 10.3641086°N 84.6650389°W
- Country: Costa Rica
- Province: Alajuela
- Canton: San Ramón
- Creation: 13 March 1951

Area
  - Total: 247.04 km^{2} (95.38 sq mi)
- Elevation: 225 m (738 ft)

Population (2011)
  - Total: 9,289
  - Density: 37.60/km^{2} (97.39/sq mi)
- Time zone: UTC−06:00
- Postal code: 20213

Peñas Blancas is a district of the San Ramón canton, in the Alajuela province of Costa Rica.

== History ==
Peñas Blancas was created on 13 March 1951 by Decreto Ejecutivo 91.

== Geography ==
Peñas Blancas has an area of 247.04 km^{2} and an elevation of 225 metres.

== Demographics ==
Historical population
| Census | Pop. | ±% p.a. |
|---|---|---|
| 1963 | 1,439 | — |
| 1973 | 3,413 | +9.02% |
| 1984 | 3,794 | +0.97% |
| 2000 | 6,632 | +3.55% |
| 2011 | 9,289 | +3.11% |
| 2022 | 11,460 | +1.93% |
Source: Instituto Nacional de Estadística y Censos; Centro Centroamericano de Población

For the 2011 census, Peñas Blancas had a population of 9,289 inhabitants.

== Transportation ==
=== Road transportation ===
The district is covered by the following road routes:

- National Route 702
- National Route 936
