= Labrador District, San Mateo =

District in San Mateo canton, Alajuela province, Costa Rica

Labrador
- District
- Interactive map of Labrador
- Labrador district location in Costa Rica
- Coordinates: 9.9335301°N 84.6330453°W
- Country: Costa Rica
- Province: Alajuela
- Canton: San Mateo
- Creation: 6 August 2012

Area
  - Total: 20.96 km^{2} (8.09 sq mi)
- Elevation: 180 m (590 ft)
- Time zone: UTC−06:00
- Postal code: 20404

Labrador is a district of the San Mateo canton, in the Alajuela province of Costa Rica.

== History ==
Labrador was created on 6 August 2012 by Acuerdo Ejecutivo N° 37-2012-MGP.

== Geography ==
Labrador has an area of 20.96 km^{2} and an elevation of 180 metres.

== Demographics ==
Historical population
Census	Pop.	±% p.a.
2022	1,783	—
Source: Instituto Nacional de Estadística y Censos; Centro Centroamericano de Población

For the 2011 census, Labrador had a population of inhabitants.

== Transportation ==
=== Road transportation ===
The district is covered by the following road routes:

- National Route 131
- National Route 755
