= San Ramón, Costa Rica =

District in San Ramón canton, Alajuela province, Costa Rica

San Ramón
- District
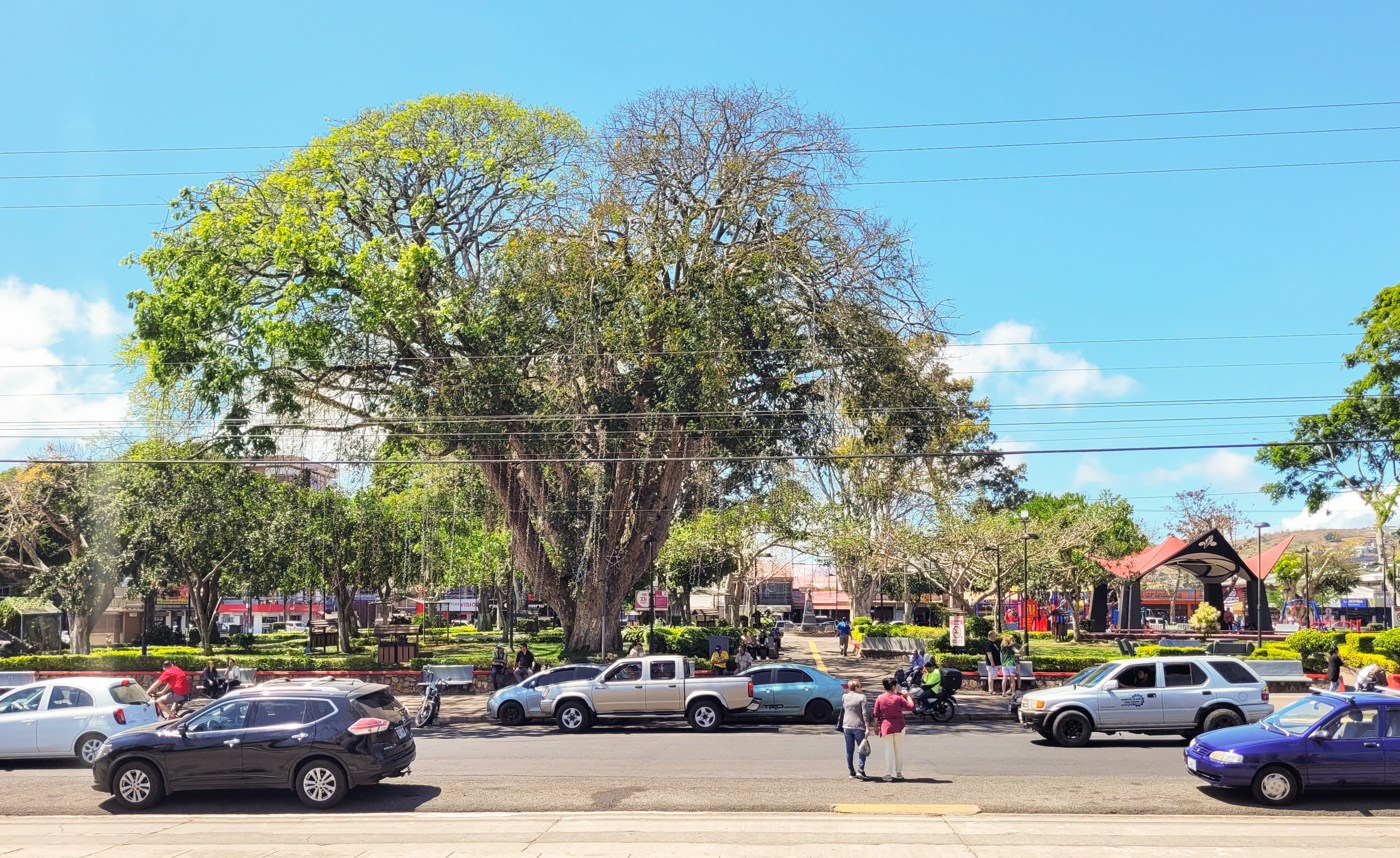
- Alberto Manuel Brenes Park, Downtown San Ramón
- San Ramón district
- San Ramón district location in Costa Rica
- Coordinates: 10°5′15″N 84°28′12″W
- Country: Costa Rica
- Province: Alajuela
- Canton: San Ramón
- Founded: 1854

Government
  - Mayor: Nixon Ureña
  - Substitute syndic: Milagro Zamora Mora

Area
  - Total: 1.28 km^{2} (0.49 sq mi)
- Elevation: 1,057 m (3,468 ft)

Population (2011)
  - Total: 8,717
  - Density: 6,810/km^{2} (17,600/sq mi)
- Time zone: UTC−06:00
- Postal code: 20201
- Website: http://www.sanramon.go.cr/

San Ramón is a district in the canton of San Ramón in Alajuela Province in Costa Rica. The central municipality (distrito) of San Ramón covers an area of 1.29 km^{2} (0.50 sq mi) and has a population of 10,710. Together with adjoining distritos, it forms what is colloquially known as Ciudad de San Ramón (San Ramón City). However, cities are no longer a valid administrative division in Costa Rica, by municipal codex law 7794 of April 30, 1998.

The district lies at an elevation of 1,057 m (3,468 ft) above sea level in the Cordillera de Tilarán.

== Location ==
San Ramon is located 55 kilometers northeast of Puntarenas on the Gulf of Nicoya, 44 kilometers northwest of the provincial capital city of Alajuela and 58 kilometers from the national capital city of San Jose.

The plaza is located 47 km WNW of Costa Rica's parliament building in the center of the capital city of San José and 31 km from Juan Santamaría International Airport in Alajuela. Its location in the central valley (Meseta Central) is c.33 km east of the Pacific coast near Puntarenas, and c.140 km west of the Caribbean at a point north of Limón. One route runs out of the north of town directly to the popular Costa Rican destination of Volcan Arenal, and the Pan-American Highway runs just south of the city's southern edge granting easy access to all other north-south points in the country, as well as linking San Ramón to the Americas.

== Geography ==
San Ramón has an area of 1.28 km^{2} and an elevation of 1057 metres. It is located with the Montes Del Aguacate (Avocado Mountains) and is part of the Corredor Biológico Montes del Aguacate (Montes del Aguacate Biological Corridor)

== Climate ==
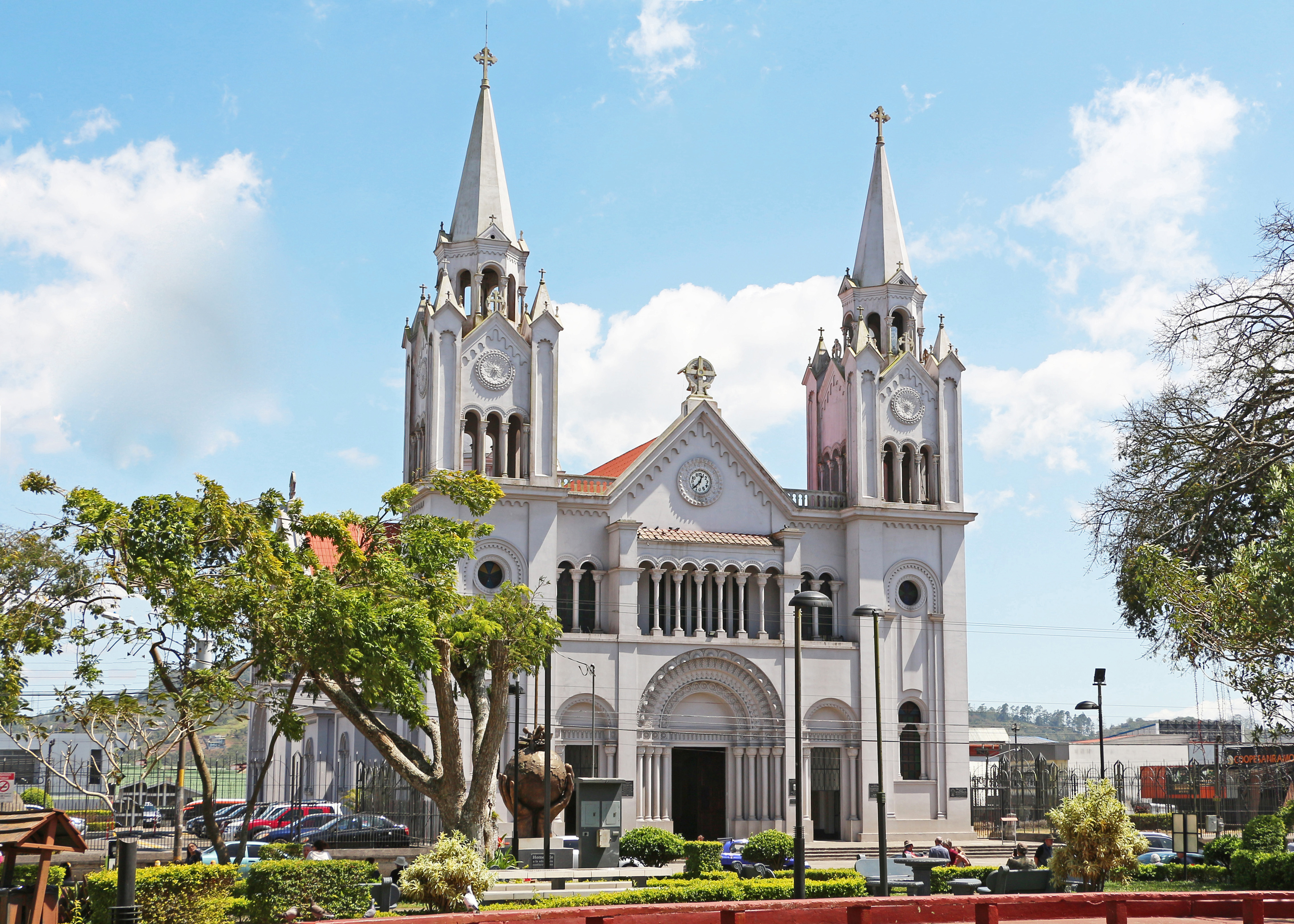
San Ramón Nonato Church

Despite the tropical latitude of San Ramón, temperatures tend to be warm rather than hot year-round: 13 to 27 °C or 55.4 to 80.6 °F. This is largely due to the city's altitude of 1,057 m (3,468 ft) above sea level. June through October is considered the rainy or "green" season with November to May considered the "dry season." Diurnal periods are very predictable due to Costa Rica's latitude: The sun rises in San Ramon by about 05:45 and sets at 18:30 with very little variation throughout the year. This regular cycle is further evident in the precipitation patterns, particularly during the rainy season. As the morning sun rises, air which is already moist due to a certain amount of orographic lift being added by the Pacific Ocean, is further loaded by evapotranspiration wherein water drawn from the ground by plants and trees is transpired into the atmosphere. This leads to a relatively consistent pattern of mostly dry mornings followed by rains in the afternoon, usually beginning around 14:00. Rains can last for a short period, or for several hours, and there is a seemingly equal chance that there will either be a downpour or a drizzle. Evenings can be cooler than one might expect due to altitude, and cooler still in the evenings following rain. At the highest elevations, temperatures down to 9 °C or 48.2 °F have been recorded.

== Demographics ==
Historical population
Census	Pop.	±% p.a.
1864	1,618	—
1883	1,953	+1.00%
1892	1,989	+0.20%
1927	2,722	+0.90%
1950	4,292	+2.00%
1963	6,973	+3.80%
1973	9,245	+2.86%
1984	9,624	+0.37%
2000	9,659	+0.02%
2011	8,717	−0.93%
2022	7,725	−1.09%
Source: Instituto Nacional de Estadística y Censos; Centro Centroamericano de Población

From the 2022 census San Ramón has a population of 7,725 showing a slight decline from the 2011 census, when San Ramón had a population of 8,717 inhabitants.

== See also ==
- Alberto Manuel Brenes Biological Reserve
