= Sarchí =

Sarchí may refer to:

- Sarchí (canton), a canton in the Alajuela province of Costa Rica
- Sarchí Norte, a district of the Sarchí canton, in the Alajuela province of Costa Rica
- Sarchí Sur, a district of the Sarchí canton, in the Alajuela province of Costa Rica

== See also ==
- Sarchi, Kurdistan, a village in Gavrud Rural District, Muchesh District, Kamyaran County, Kurdistan Province, Iran
- Philippe Sarchi (1764-1830), Italian lawyer and linguist
