= San Isidro District =

San Isidro District may refer to:

- Peru
  - San Isidro District, Lima, a district of the Lima province
- Costa Rica
  - San Isidro District, Alajuela, in Alajuela (canton), Alajuela province
  - San Isidro District, Atenas, in Atenas (canton), Alajuela province
  - San Isidro District, El Guarco, in El Guarco (canton), Cartago province
  - San Isidro District, Grecia, in Grecia (canton), Alajuela province
  - San Isidro District, León Cortés, in León Cortés (canton), San José province
  - San Isidro District, Montes de Oro, in Montes de Oro (canton), Puntarenas province
  - San Isidro District, San Isidro, in San Isidro (canton), Heredia province
  - San Isidro District, San Ramón, in San Ramón (canton), Alajuela province
  - San Isidro, Vázquez de Coronado, in Vázquez de Coronado (canton), San José province
  - San Isidro del El General District, in Pérez Zeledón (canton), San José province
