= Sarchi =

Sarchi may refer to

- Sarchi, Kurdistan, village in Gavrud Rural District, Kurdistan Province, Iran
- Sarchi (surname), surname

== See also ==
- Sarchí (disambiguation)
