= Santiago District =

Santiago District may refer to:

- Santiago District, Palmares, Alajuela Province, Costa Rica
- Santiago District, San Ramón, Alajuela Province, Costa Rica
- Santiago District, Puriscal, San José Province, Costa Rica
- Santiago District, San Rafael, Heredia Province, Costa Rica
- Santiago District, Paraíso, Cartago Province, Costa Rica
- Santiago District, Veraguas, Panama
- Santiago District, Paraguay, Misiones Department
- Santiago District, Cusco, Peru
- Santiago District, Ica, Peru

== See also ==
- Río Santiago District
