= Escuela de Arquitectura de la Universidad de Costa Rica =

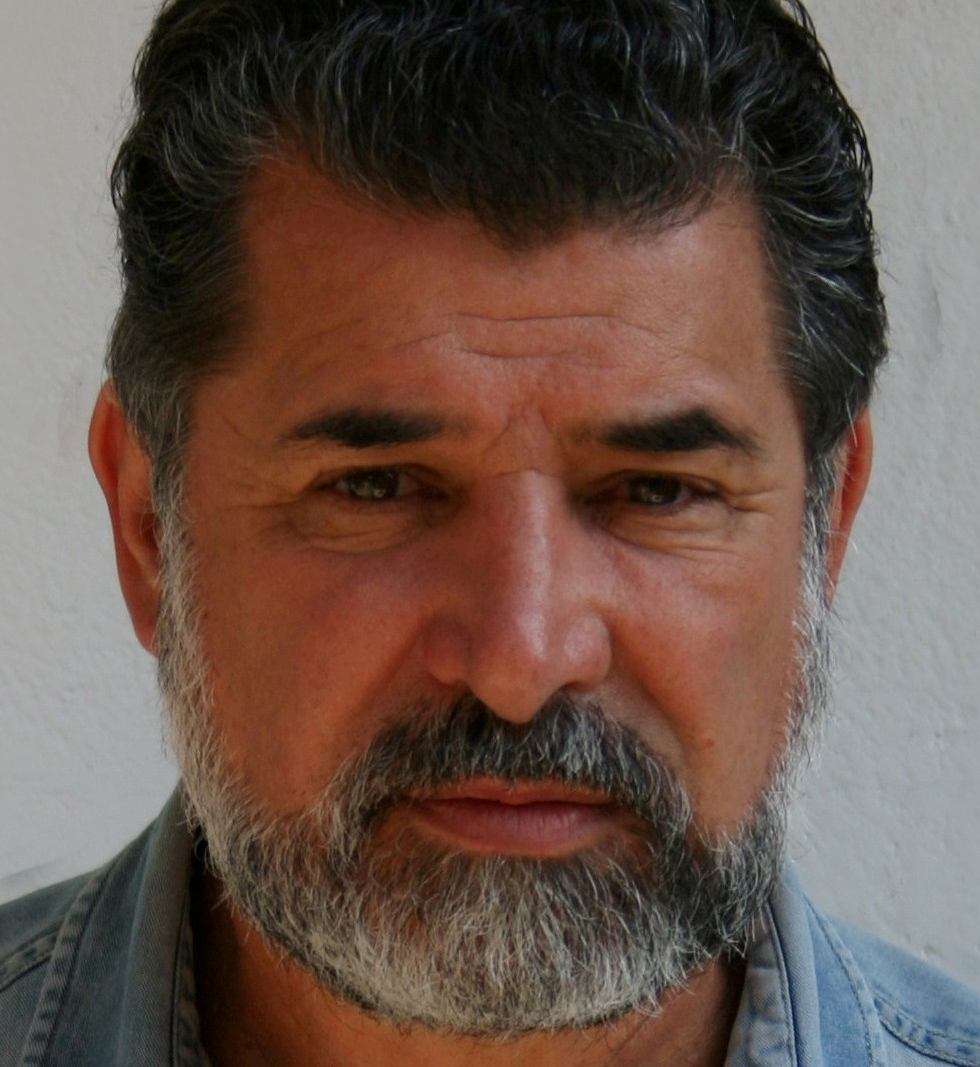
Ibo Bonilla is the first graduated architect in Costa Rica. UCR, 1977

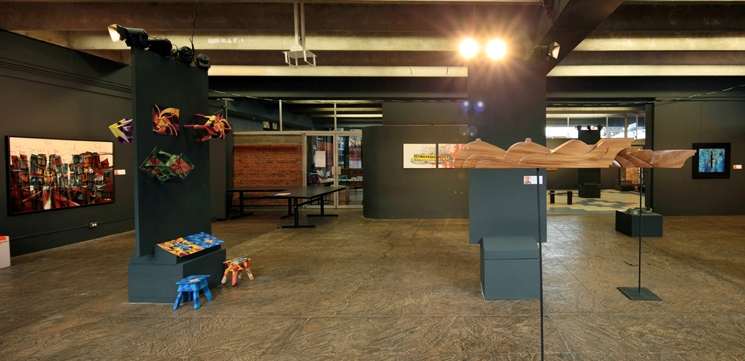
EXPO ARTQUIS celebrating in 2011 the 40th anniversary of the School, with works by "Felo" García, Manuel Zumbado, Ibo Bonilla, Gilberth Vargas and many other architects and artists

The Escuela de Arquitectura de la Universidad de Costa Rica is the principal school of architecture in Costa Rica. It is part of the Faculty of Engineering at the University of Costa Rica.

== History ==
The School of Architecture of the University of Costa Rica was founded in 1971. Prior to that year, the few architects that were in the country, had studied mainly in Mexico, Chile, and the United States, which means that construction was primarily regulated by civil engineers, who left their mark and perspective around the entire country, but with the insertion of many new architects, it is being reoriented toward a vision that is architectural in character.

The first director of the School was the plastic artist Rafael Ángel "Felo" García and the first architect graduated in Costa Rica is Ibo Bonilla who has distinguished himself internationally in bioclimatic architecture and as a sculptor of the highest sculptures in the country.

== Teaching methodology ==
The new school started with controversy given its innovative curriculum, different from the traditional, basing its focus of the architectonic object as a part of an urban process and creating results based on its consideration of the physical and cultural environment.

Architects Jorge Bertheau, Rafael Ángel García, and Édgar Brenes implemented the teaching methodology based on integrated multidisciplinary studies, with emphasis on teamwork and real projects applied to specific communities. They obtained a scholarship to study the architecture in England.

== Academic program ==
The career includes an academic program to obtain a degree in 5 years. Nevertheless, it is uncommon for a student to complete the degree within the 5 years along with the required thesis. The system is academically open, in that the student decides how many and what specific courses he wants to carry each semester.

The primary axis of the career program is in the area of design. Thus, 10 workshops on design are imparted, within which the student is challenged with various kinds of design problems: that can go from designing a cafeteria to a high rise. Complementary to the area of design, there are theoretical courses (which deal with, but not limited to theory on architecture), supplementary subjects, which are required by the University of Costa Rica, such as courses in art, sports, humanities, history, etc.

== Masters ==
- Urban Design: with a concentration on developing proposals consistent with urban design, focusing on the Latin American reality and the behaviors of its inhabitants.
- Tropical Architecture: its intent is to address architecture from the reality of Costa Rica's climate, which encompasses tropical zones, with huge contrasts temperatures and humidity. Also, part of the emphasis of this masters program, is the intent to guide the designer towards the bioclimatic trends of design.
- Technology and Construction: its purpose is to guide the professionals towards an adequate use of technological tools applied to construction. It exposes the participants to the most recent innovations in the field, while simultaneously complementing the students formation with talks and additional materials.
- Landscaping: it deals with the relationships among architecture, the human being, and the environment with a scope controlled and defined by man. It studies more deeply the diversity of plants and construction materials from a naturalistic orientation, and how these relate to a human environment.

== Admission ==
There are various requirements:

- Have completed secondary education, including the exams of the Ministry of Education of Costa Rica.
- Have completed the admission exam of the University of Costa Rica, and have obtained on the exam, the required score needed to make it into the field of study (the score varies from year to year).
- Pass the aptitude test from the School.

Each year, about 1000 students who obtained the minimum score on the admission exam of the university, can enroll to take the aptitude test. Approximately 70 pass it and are admitted to study architecture.

== Literature ==
- Troyo, Elena, ed. (1998). Historia de la Arquitectura en Costa Rica. Fundación Museos Banco Central, San José. ISBN 9968-9795-4-6.
