= Rodríguez District =

District in Sarchí canton, Alajuela province, Costa Rica

Rodríguez
- District
- Rodríguez district
- Rodríguez district location in Costa Rica
- Coordinates: 10.1178688°N 84.3481416°W
- Country: Costa Rica
- Province: Alajuela
- Canton: Sarchí
- Creation: 10 December 1971

Area
  - Total: 7.21 km^{2} (2.78 sq mi)
- Elevation: 1,033 m (3,389 ft)

Population (2011)
  - Total: 2,121
  - Density: 294/km^{2} (762/sq mi)
- Time zone: UTC−06:00
- Postal code: 21205

Rodríguez is a district of the Sarchí canton, in the Alajuela province of Costa Rica.

== History ==
Rodríguez was created on 10 December 1971 by Decreto Ejecutivo 2101-G. Segregated from Sarchí Norte.

== Geography ==
Rodríguez has an area of 7.21 km^{2} and an elevation of 1,033 metres.

== Demographics ==
Historical population
Census	Pop.	±% p.a.
1973	1,434	—
1984	1,531	+0.60%
2000	1,841	+1.16%
2011	2,121	+1.30%
2022	3,011	+3.24%
Source: Instituto Nacional de Estadística y Censos; Centro Centroamericano de Población

For the 2011 census, Rodríguez had a population of 2,121 inhabitants.

== Transportation ==
=== Road transportation ===
The district is covered by the following road routes:

- National Route 710
