= Mercedes District =

Mercedes District may refer to the following areas of Costa Rica:

- Mercedes District, Atenas, in Alajuela province
- Mercedes District, Guácimo, in Limón province
- Mercedes District, Heredia, in Heredia province
- Mercedes District, Montes de Oca, in San José province
