= San Pedro District, Sarchí =

District in Sarchí canton, Alajuela province, Costa Rica

San Pedro
- District
- San Pedro district
- San Pedro district location in Costa Rica
- Coordinates: 10.1388267°N 84.3062317°W
- Country: Costa Rica
- Province: Alajuela
- Canton: Sarchí
- Creation: 14 December 1964

Area
  - Total: 10.92 km^{2} (4.22 sq mi)
- Elevation: 1,170 m (3,840 ft)

Population (2011)
  - Total: 3,408
  - Density: 312.1/km^{2} (808.3/sq mi)
- Time zone: UTC−06:00
- Postal code: 21204

San Pedro is a district of the Sarchí canton, in the Alajuela province of Costa Rica.

== History ==
San Pedro was created on 14 December 1964 by Ley 3467. Segregated from Sarchí Sur.

== Geography ==
San Pedro has an area of 10.92 km^{2} and an elevation of 1,170 metres.

== Economy ==
There is an annual tomato fair in the San Pedro hamlet of Trojas town of this district, in which the local version of La Tomatina occurs.

== Demographics ==
Historical population
Census	Pop.	±% p.a.
1973	1,251	—
1984	1,833	+3.53%
2000	3,296	+3.74%
2011	3,408	+0.30%
2022	4,136	+1.78%
Source: Instituto Nacional de Estadística y Censos; Centro Centroamericano de Población

For the 2011 census, San Pedro had a population of 3,408 inhabitants.

== Transportation ==
=== Road transportation ===
The district is covered by the following road routes:

- National Route 118
- National Route 708
