= Sarchi (surname) =

Sarchi is a surname. Notable people with the surname include:

- Alessandra Sarchi (born 1971), Italian writer
- Charles Sarchi (1803 - 1879), French philosopher, financier, essayist
- Philippe Sarchi (1764 - 1830), lawyer, linguist, philologist of Illyrian origin

== See also ==
- Sarchi (disambiguation)
