= San Juan District, Naranjo =

District in Naranjo canton, Alajuela province, Costa Rica

San Juan
- District
- San Juan district
- San Juan district location in Costa Rica
- Coordinates: 10.1186432°N 84.4122261°W
- Country: Costa Rica
- Province: Alajuela
- Canton: Naranjo
- Creation: 31 March 1966

Area
  - Total: 6.78 km^{2} (2.62 sq mi)
- Elevation: 1,180 m (3,870 ft)

Population (2011)
  - Total: 3,114
  - Density: 459/km^{2} (1,190/sq mi)
- Time zone: UTC−06:00
- Postal code: 20606

San Juan is a district of the Naranjo canton, in the Alajuela province of Costa Rica.

== History ==
San Juan was created on 31 March 1966 by Decreto Ejecutivo 11. Segregated from Naranjo.

== Geography ==
San Juan has an area of 6.78 km^{2} and an elevation of 1,180 metres.

== Demographics ==
Historical population
Census	Pop.	±% p.a.
1973	2,559	—
1984	2,715	+0.54%
2000	2,709	−0.01%
2011	3,114	+1.27%
2022	3,448	+0.93%
Source: Instituto Nacional de Estadística y Censos; Centro Centroamericano de Población

For the 2011 census, San Juan had a population of 3,114 inhabitants.

== Transportation ==
=== Road transportation ===
The district is covered by the following road routes:

- National Route 141
- National Route 148
- National Route 725
- National Route 726
