= La Granja District =

District in Palmares canton, Alajuela province, Costa Rica

La Granja
- District
- Interactive map of La Granja
- La Granja district location in Costa Rica
- Coordinates: 10.055495°N 84.4487436°W
- Country: Costa Rica
- Province: Alajuela
- Canton: Palmares
- Creation: 14 December 1964

Area
  - Total: 4.44 km^{2} (1.71 sq mi)
- Elevation: 1,030 m (3,380 ft)

Population (2011)
  - Total: 4,119
  - Density: 928/km^{2} (2,400/sq mi)
- Time zone: UTC−06:00
- Postal code: 20707

La Granja is a district of the Palmares canton, in the Alajuela province of Costa Rica.

== History ==
La Granja was created on 14 December 1964 by Ley 3468. Segregated from Buenos Aires.

== Geography ==
La Granja has an area of 4.44 km^{2} and an elevation of 1,030 metres.

== Demographics ==
Historical population
Census	Pop.	±% p.a.
1892	356	—
1973	1,442	+1.74%
1984	2,174	+3.80%
2000	3,210	+2.47%
2011	4,119	+2.29%
2022	4,587	+0.98%
Source: Instituto Nacional de Estadística y Censos; Centro Centroamericano de Población

For the 2011 census, La Granja had a population of 4,119 inhabitants.

== Transportation ==
=== Road transportation ===
The district is covered by the following road routes:

- National Route 1
- National Route 135
- National Route 169
