= Candelaria District =

District in Palmares canton, Alajuela province, Costa Rica

Candelaria
- District
- Interactive map of Candelaria
- Candelaria district location in Costa Rica
- Coordinates: 10.0257074°N 84.4199164°W
- Country: Costa Rica
- Province: Alajuela
- Canton: Palmares
- Creation: 19 April 1911

Area
  - Total: 4.69 km^{2} (1.81 sq mi)
- Elevation: 1,040 m (3,410 ft)

Population (2011)
  - Total: 1,961
  - Density: 418/km^{2} (1,080/sq mi)
- Time zone: UTC−06:00
- Postal code: 20705

Candelaria is a district of the Palmares canton, in the Alajuela province of Costa Rica.

== History ==
Candelaria was created on 19 April 1911. Segregated from Atenas canton.

== Geography ==
Candelaria has an area of 4.69 km² and an elevation of 1,040 metres.

== Demographics ==
Historical population
Census	Pop.	±% p.a.
1927	714	—
1950	618	−0.63%
1963	688	+0.83%
1973	740	+0.73%
1984	908	+1.88%
2000	1,745	+4.17%
2011	1,961	+1.07%
2022	2,217	+1.12%
Source: Instituto Nacional de Estadística y Censos; Centro Centroamericano de Población

For the 2011 census, Candelaria had a population of 1,961 inhabitants.

== Transportation ==
=== Road transportation ===
The district is covered by the following road routes:

- National Route 135
