= El Rosario District =

District in Naranjo canton, Alajuela province, Costa Rica

El Rosario
- District
- Interactive map of El Rosario
- El Rosario district location in Costa Rica
- Coordinates: 10.0449566°N 84.3841937°W
- Country: Costa Rica
- Province: Alajuela
- Canton: Naranjo
- Creation: 14 January 1967

Area
  - Total: 17.21 km^{2} (6.64 sq mi)
- Elevation: 835 m (2,740 ft)

Population (2011)
  - Total: 3,757
  - Density: 218.3/km^{2} (565.4/sq mi)
- Time zone: UTC−06:00
- Postal code: 20607

El Rosario is a district of the Naranjo canton, in the Alajuela province of Costa Rica.

== History ==
El Rosario was created on 14 January 1967 by Ley 4020. Segregated from San Miguel.

== Geography ==
El Rosario has an area of 17.21 km^{2} and an elevation of 835 metres.

== Demographics ==
Historical population
Census	Pop.	±% p.a.
1973	1,495	—
1984	1,810	+1.75%
2000	3,129	+3.48%
2011	3,757	+1.68%
2022	4,125	+0.85%
Source: Instituto Nacional de Estadística y Censos; Centro Centroamericano de Población

For the 2011 census, El Rosario had a population of 3,757 inhabitants.

== Transportation ==
=== Road transportation ===
The district is covered by the following road routes:

- National Route 1
- National Route 715
