= Brenes (surname) =

Brenes is a Spanish surname. Notable people with the surname include:

- Abderramán Brenes (born 1978), Puerto Rican judoka
- Bartosz Brenes (born 1989), Costa Rican DJ
- Carlos Alberto Brenes (1884–1942), President of Nicaragua
- Diana Brenes (born 1997), Costa Rican judoka
- Édgar Brenes, Costa Rican architect
- Humberto Brenes (born 1951), Costa Rican poker player
- Eric Brenes, Costa Rican poker player
- Leopoldo José Brenes Solórzano (born 1949), Nicaraguan Roman Catholic cardinal and Archbishop of Managua
- Nery Brenes (born 1985), Costa Rican sprinter
- Oswaldo Brenes Álvarez (1942–2013), Costa Rican Roman Catholic bishop
- Pablo Brenes (born 1982), Costa Rican footballer
- Randall Brenes (born 1983), Costa Rican footballer
- Roberto Brenes Mesén (1874–1947), Costa Rican politician, writer, educator, and journalist
- Victor Brenes, Costa Rican Minister of Education
- Jorge Brenes (born 1980), Costa Rican cardiologist
- Chico Brenes (born 1975), Nicaraguan skateboarder

Historically Brenes was a Magyar name. The Brenes clan was among the first of the Magyars to cross over the Carpathian Mountains, in the 13th century. They were answering the call of the Catholic Prince of Moravia for warriors, to defend his principality from Muslim invaders. In the 15th century, Two Brenes brothers lead an army to Spain, to join the Catholic monarchs, Ferdinand and Isabella, in the war to expel the Muslims from Andalusia. They were rewarded with a large tract of land in Sevilla, the location of the town, Brenes. In the 17th century, two Brenes brothers were given land grants in Costa Rica, the last Spanish Colony to be established in the New World.
