= Escobal District =

District in Atenas canton, Alajuela province, Costa Rica

Escobal
- District
- Interactive map of Escobal
- Escobal district location in Costa Rica
- Coordinates: 9.944592°N 84.4257529°W
- Country: Costa Rica
- Province: Alajuela
- Canton: Atenas
- Creation: 8 March 2004

Area
  - Total: 26.5 km^{2} (10.2 sq mi)
- Elevation: 376 m (1,234 ft)

Population (2011)
  - Total: 848
  - Density: 32.0/km^{2} (82.9/sq mi)
- Time zone: UTC−06:00
- Postal code: 20508

Escobal is a district of the Atenas canton, in the Alajuela province of Costa Rica.

== History ==
Escobal was created on 8 March 2004 by Decreto Ejecutivo 31653-G.

== Geography ==
Escobal has an area of 26.5 km^{2} and an elevation of 376 metres.

== Demographics ==
Historical population
Census	Pop.	±% p.a.
2011	848	—
2022	844	−0.04%
Source: Instituto Nacional de Estadística y Censos; Centro Centroamericano de Población

For the 2011 census, Escobal had a population of 848 inhabitants.

== Transportation ==
=== Road transportation ===
The district is covered by the following road routes:

- National Route 27
- National Route 707
