= National Route 715 (Costa Rica) =

National Road Route in Costa Rica

National Tertiary Route 715
- Ruta nacional terciaria 715

Route information
- Maintained by Ministry of Public Works and Transport
- Length: 14.805 km (9.199 mi)

Location
- Country: Costa Rica
- Provinces: Alajuela

Highway system
- National Road Network of Costa Rica
← Route 714	→ Route 716

National Tertiary Route 715, or just Route 715 (Spanish: Ruta Nacional Terciaria 715, or Ruta 715) is a National Road Route of Costa Rica located in the Alajuela province.

== Description ==
In Alajuela province the route covers Naranjo canton (Naranjo, San Miguel, and El Rosario districts) and Palmares canton (Zaragoza and Esquipulas districts).
