= Concepción District, Atenas =

District in Atenas canton, Alajuela province, Costa Rica

Concepción
- District
- Interactive map of Concepción
- Concepción district location in Costa Rica
- Coordinates: 9.9561021°N 84.3712008°W
- Country: Costa Rica
- Province: Alajuela
- Canton: Atenas

Area
  - Total: 21.94 km^{2} (8.47 sq mi)
- Elevation: 535 m (1,755 ft)

Population (2011)
  - Total: 3,473
  - Density: 158.3/km^{2} (410.0/sq mi)
- Time zone: UTC−06:00
- Postal code: 20505

Concepción is a district of the Atenas canton, in the Alajuela province of Costa Rica.

== Geography ==
Concepción has an area of 21.94 km^{2} and an elevation of 535 metres.

== Demographics ==
Historical population
Census	Pop.	±% p.a.
1864	805	—
1892	729	−0.35%
1927	1,037	+1.01%
1950	1,217	+0.70%
1963	1,288	+0.44%
1973	1,397	+0.82%
1984	1,953	+3.09%
2000	3,048	+2.82%
2011	3,473	+1.19%
2022	5,031	+3.43%
Source: Instituto Nacional de Estadística y Censos; Centro Centroamericano de Población

For the 2011 census, Concepción had a population of 3,473 inhabitants.

== Transportation ==
=== Road transportation ===
The district is covered by the following road routes:

- National Route 3
- National Route 27
- National Route 134
- National Route 720
