= National Route 725 (Costa Rica) =

National Road Route in Costa Rica

National Tertiary Route 725
- Ruta nacional terciaria 725

Route information
- Maintained by Ministry of Public Works and Transport
- Length: 5.300 km (3.293 mi)

Location
- Country: Costa Rica
- Provinces: Alajuela

Highway system
- National Road Network of Costa Rica
← Route 723	→ Route 726

National Tertiary Route 725, or just Route 725 (Spanish: Ruta Nacional Terciaria 725, or Ruta 725) is a National Road Route of Costa Rica located in the Alajuela province.

== Description ==
In Alajuela province the route covers San Ramón canton (Concepción district) and Naranjo canton (Naranjo and San Juan districts).
