= National Route 713 (Costa Rica) =

National Road Route in Costa Rica

National Tertiary Route 713
- Ruta nacional terciaria 713

Route information
- Maintained by Ministry of Public Works and Transport
- Length: 17.455 km (10.846 mi)

Location
- Country: Costa Rica
- Provinces: Alajuela

Highway system
- National Road Network of Costa Rica
← Route 712	→ Route 714

National Tertiary Route 713, or just Route 713 (Spanish: Ruta Nacional Terciaria 713, or Ruta 713) is a National Road Route of Costa Rica located in the Alajuela province.

== Description ==
In Alajuela province the route covers San Ramón canton (San Rafael district), San Mateo canton (Desmonte district), Atenas canton (Jesús district), and Palmares canton (Zaragoza and Santiago districts).
