= Santiago District, Palmares =

District in Palmares canton, Alajuela province, Costa Rica

Santiago
- District
- Santiago district
- Santiago district location in Costa Rica
- Coordinates: 10.0217648°N 84.4487684°W
- Country: Costa Rica
- Province: Alajuela
- Canton: Palmares
- Creation: 19 April 1911

Area
  - Total: 7.94 km^{2} (3.07 sq mi)
- Elevation: 1,080 m (3,540 ft)

Population (2011)
  - Total: 2,737
  - Density: 345/km^{2} (893/sq mi)
- Time zone: UTC−06:00
- Postal code: 20704

Santiago is a district of the Palmares canton, in the Alajuela province of Costa Rica.

== History ==
Santiago was created on 19 April 1911 by Decreto Ejecutivo 12. Segregated from Atenas canton.

== Geography ==
Santiago has an area of 7.94 km^{2} and an elevation of 1,080 metres.

== Demographics ==
Historical population
| Census | Pop. | ±% p.a. |
|---|---|---|
| 1927 | 833 | — |
| 1950 | 969 | +0.66% |
| 1963 | 1,871 | +5.19% |
| 1973 | 1,946 | +0.39% |
| 1984 | 1,964 | +0.08% |
| 2000 | 2,682 | +1.97% |
| 2011 | 2,737 | +0.18% |
| 2022 | 3,104 | +1.15% |
Source: Instituto Nacional de Estadística y Censos; Centro Centroamericano de Población

For the 2011 census, Santiago had a population of 2,737 inhabitants.

== Transportation ==
=== Road transportation ===
The district is covered by the following road routes:

- National Route 713
- National Route 714
