= San José District, Atenas =

District in Atenas canton, Alajuela province, Costa Rica

San José
- District
- San José district
- San José district location in Costa Rica
- Coordinates: 10.0155342°N 84.4048355°W
- Country: Costa Rica
- Province: Alajuela
- Canton: Atenas

Area
  - Total: 13.44 km^{2} (5.19 sq mi)
- Elevation: 738 m (2,421 ft)

Population (2011)
  - Total: 1,940
  - Density: 144/km^{2} (374/sq mi)
- Time zone: UTC−06:00
- Postal code: 20506

San José is a district of the Atenas canton, in the Alajuela province of Costa Rica.

== Geography ==
San José has an area of 13.44 km^{2} and an elevation of 738 metres.

== Demographics ==
Historical population
Census	Pop.	±% p.a.
1864	319	—
1883	729	+4.45%
1892	513	−3.83%
1927	1,249	+2.57%
1950	1,116	−0.49%
1963	1,249	+0.87%
1973	1,248	−0.01%
1984	1,564	+2.07%
2000	1,794	+0.86%
2011	1,940	+0.71%
2022	2,485	+2.28%
Source: Instituto Nacional de Estadística y Censos; Centro Centroamericano de Población

For the 2011 census, San José had a population of 1,940 inhabitants.

== Transportation ==
=== Road transportation ===
The district is covered by the following road routes:

- National Route 135
