= Palmares de Alajuela =

District in Palmares canton, Alajuela province, Costa Rica

Palmares
- District
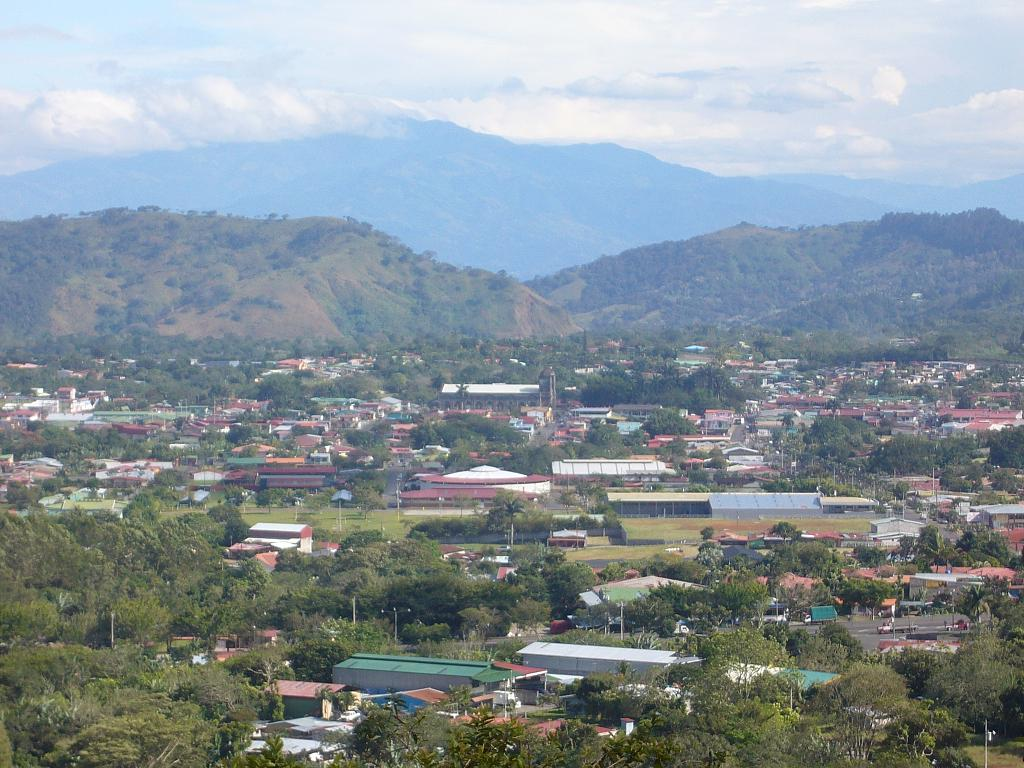
- Skyline of Palmares
- Palmares district
- Palmares district location in Costa Rica
- Coordinates: 10.055229°N 84.4326974°W
- Country: Costa Rica
- Province: Alajuela
- Canton: Palmares

Area
  - Total: 1.14 km^{2} (0.44 sq mi)
- Elevation: 1,017 m (3,337 ft)

Population (2011)
  - Total: 3,599
  - Density: 3,160/km^{2} (8,180/sq mi)
- Time zone: UTC−06:00
- Postal code: 20701

Palmares is a district of the Palmares canton, in the Alajuela province of Costa Rica.

== Geography ==
Palmares has an area of 1.14 km^{2} and an elevation of 1,017 metres. It is in the Central Valley (Valle Central), 6 kilometers southeast of the city of San Ramón, 38 kilometers northwest of the provincial capital city of Alajuela, and 56 kilometers from the national capital city of San Jose. It is located with the Montes Del Aguacate (Avocado Mountains) and is part of the Corredor Biológico Montes del Aguacate (Montes del Aguacate Biological Corridor).

== Demographics ==
Historical population
Census	Pop.	±% p.a.
1883	2,142	—
1892	741	−11.13%
1927	1,364	+1.76%
1950	1,643	+0.81%
1963	2,348	+2.78%
1973	3,083	+2.76%
1984	3,766	+1.84%
2000	4,105	+0.54%
2011	3,599	−1.19%
2022	2,940	−1.82%
Source: Instituto Nacional de Estadística y Censos; Centro Centroamericano de Población

For the 2011 census, Palmares had a population of 3,599 inhabitants.

== Transportation ==
=== Road transportation ===
The district is covered by the following road routes:

- National Route 135
- National Route 148

== Culture ==
=== Fiestas de Palmares ===
During January the city hosts their 'Fiestas', a large fair organized by a local committee which have become along with Zapote in December, and Liberia in July, one of the largest fairs in the country. This fair lasts for two weeks, with two days of special note: the 'Tope' (a massive horseback riding parade through town) and the 'Carnaval' (carnival); it is said that during these days you can find over 500,000 people in Palmares. It ranks 2nd in most beer consumed in a yearly festival (after Oktoberfest)
