= Jesús District, Atenas =

District in Atenas canton, Alajuela province, Costa Rica

Jesús
- District
- Interactive map of Jesús
- Jesús district location in Costa Rica
- Coordinates: 9.9559173°N 84.4255278°W
- Country: Costa Rica
- Province: Alajuela
- Canton: Atenas

Area
  - Total: 17.96 km^{2} (6.93 sq mi)
- Elevation: 874 m (2,867 ft)

Population (2011)
  - Total: 3,631
  - Density: 202.2/km^{2} (523.6/sq mi)
- Time zone: UTC−06:00
- Postal code: 20502

Jesús is a district of the Atenas canton, in the Alajuela province of Costa Rica.

== Geography ==
Jesús has an area of 17.96 square kilometres (6.93 sq mi) and an elevation of 874 metres (2,867 ft).

== Demographics ==
Historical population
| Census | Pop. | ±% p.a. |
|---|---|---|
| 1883 | 762 | — |
| 1892 | 1,125 | +4.42% |
| 1927 | 1,924 | +1.55% |
| 1950 | 1,883 | −0.09% |
| 1963 | 2,111 | +0.88% |
| 1973 | 2,355 | +1.10% |
| 1984 | 2,671 | +1.15% |
| 2000 | 3,598 | +1.88% |
| 2011 | 3,631 | +0.08% |
| 2022 | 4,371 | +1.70% |
Source: Instituto Nacional de Estadística y Censos; Centro Centroamericano de Población

For the 2011 census, Jesús had a population of 3,631 inhabitants.

== Transportation ==
=== Road transportation ===
The district is covered by the following road routes:

- National Route 3
- National Route 27
- National Route 707
- National Route 713
