= National Route 135 (Costa Rica) =

National Road Route in Costa Rica

National Secondary Route 135
- Ruta nacional secundaria 135

Route information
- Maintained by Ministry of Public Works and Transport
- Length: 21.925 km (13.624 mi)

Location
- Country: Costa Rica
- Provinces: Alajuela

Highway system
- National Road Network of Costa Rica
← Route 134	→ Route 136

National Secondary Route 135, or just Route 135 (Spanish: Ruta Nacional Secundaria 135, or Ruta 135) is a National Road Route of Costa Rica located in the Alajuela province.

== Description ==
In Alajuela province the route covers San Ramón canton (San Ramón, San Rafael, and San Isidro districts), Atenas canton (Atenas, Mercedes, San José, and Santa Eulalia districts), and Palmares canton (Palmares, Zaragoza, Buenos Aires, Candelaria, and La Granja districts).
