= Naranjo (canton) =

Canton in Alajuela province, Costa Rica

- Canton
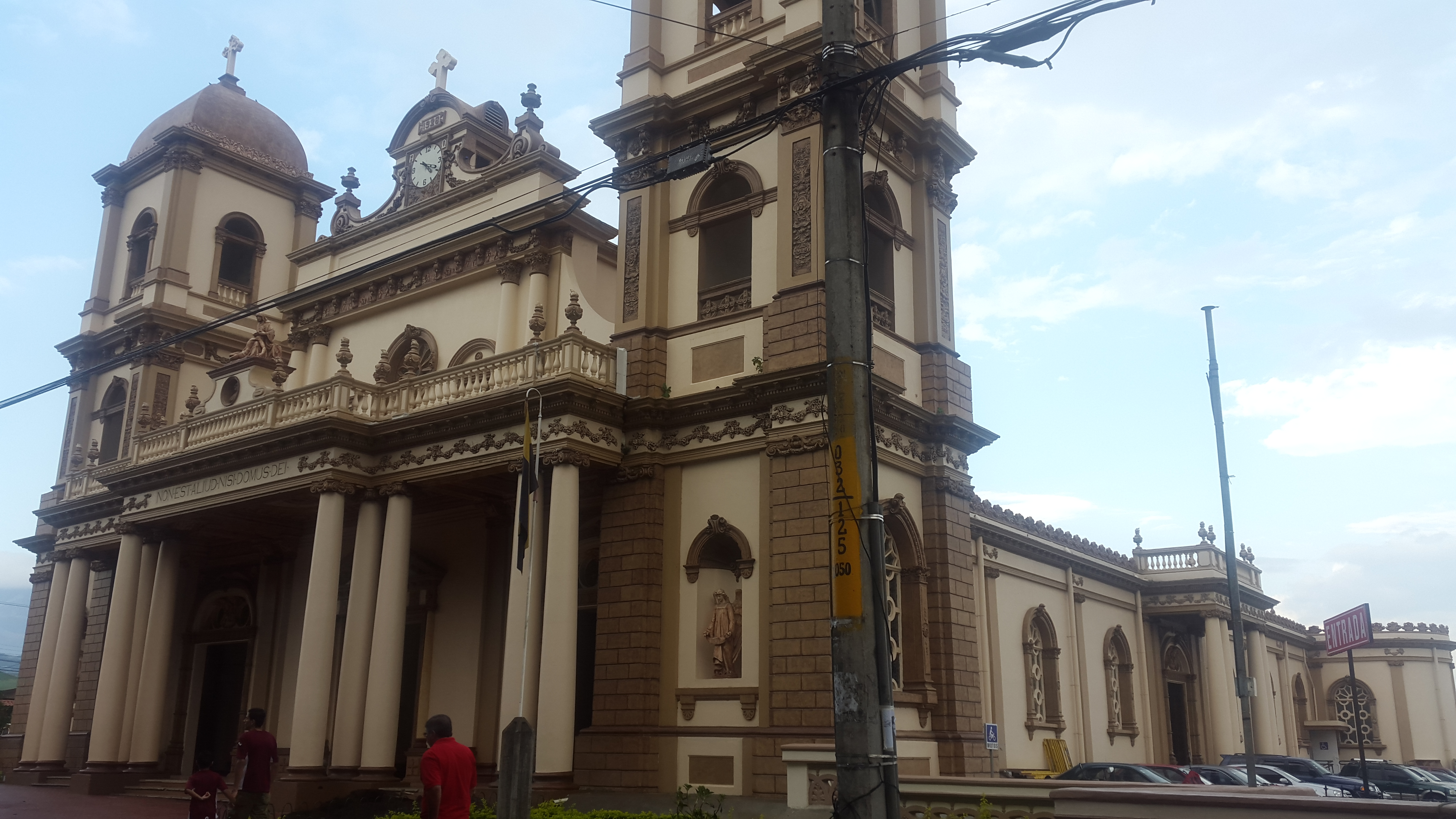
- Naranjo Church

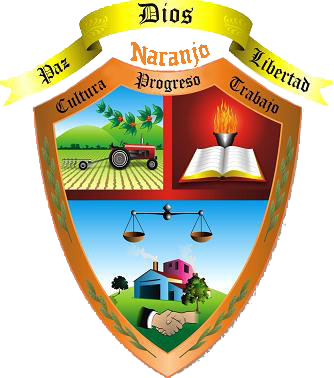
- Flag Seal
- Naranjo canton
- Naranjo canton location in Alajuela Province Naranjo canton location in Costa Rica
- Coordinates: 10.1052938°N 84.3885279°W
- Country: Costa Rica
- Province: Alajuela
- Creation: 9 March 1886
- Head city: Naranjo
- Districts: Districts: Naranjo; San Miguel; San José; Cirrí Sur; San Jerónimo; San Juan; El Rosario; Palmitos

Government
  - Type: Municipality
  - Body: Municipalidad de Naranjo

Area
  - Total: 126.62 km^{2} (48.89 sq mi)
- Elevation: 1,121 m (3,678 ft)

Population (2011)
  - Total: 42,713
  - Density: 337.33/km^{2} (873.69/sq mi)
- Time zone: UTC−06:00
- Canton code: 206
- Website: www.naranjo.go.cr

Naranjo is a canton in the Alajuela province of Costa Rica. The head city is located in the homonymous Naranjo district.

== Toponymy ==
It is named for the citrus plantations found in the area. In Spanish a naranjo refers to an orange tree, while the fruits are naranjas.

== History ==
Naranjo was created on 9 March 1886 by decree 9.

== Geography ==
Naranjo has an area of 126.62 km^{2} and a mean elevation of 1,121 metres.

The Grande River forms the western and southern boundaries of the canton. The Espino River is on the north, and the Colorado and Molino rivers establish the eastern border.

== Districts ==
The canton of Naranjo is subdivided into the following districts:

1. Naranjo
2. San Miguel
3. San José
4. Cirrí Sur
5. San Jerónimo
6. San Juan
7. El Rosario
8. Palmitos

== Demographics ==
Historical population
Census	Pop.	±% p.a.
1883	4,593	—
1892	6,847	+4.54%
1927	7,910	+0.41%
1950	10,839	+1.38%
1963	16,414	+3.24%
1973	19,721	+1.85%
1984	23,588	+1.64%
2000	37,602	+2.96%
2011	42,713	+1.17%
2022	46,647	+0.80%
Source: Instituto Nacional de Estadística y Censos; Centro Centroamericano de Población

For the 2011 census, Naranjo had a population of 42,713 inhabitants.

== Transportation ==
=== Road transportation ===
The canton is covered by the following road routes:

- National Route 1
- National Route 118
- National Route 141
- National Route 148
- National Route 703
- National Route 704
- National Route 706
- National Route 709
- National Route 710
- National Route 715
- National Route 725
- National Route 726
