= National Route 710 (Costa Rica) =

National Road Route in Costa Rica

National Tertiary Route 710
- Ruta nacional terciaria 710

Route information
- Maintained by Ministry of Public Works and Transport
- Length: 4.240 km (2.635 mi)

Location
- Country: Costa Rica
- Provinces: Alajuela

Highway system
- National Road Network of Costa Rica
← Route 709	→ Route 711

National Tertiary Route 710, or just Route 710 (Spanish: Ruta Nacional Terciaria 710, or Ruta 710) is a National Road Route of Costa Rica, located in the Alajuela province.

== Description ==
In Alajuela province the route covers Naranjo canton (Cirrí Sur and San Jerónimo districts) and Sarchí canton (Sarchí Norte and Rodríguez districts).
