= National Route 148 (Costa Rica) =

National Road Route in Costa Rica

National Secondary Route 148
- Ruta nacional secundaria 148

Route information
- Maintained by Ministry of Public Works and Transport
- Length: 11.095 km (6.894 mi)

Location
- Country: Costa Rica
- Provinces: Alajuela

Highway system
- National Road Network of Costa Rica
← Route 147	→ Route 149

National Secondary Route 148, or just Route 148 (Spanish: Ruta Nacional Secundaria 148, or Ruta 148) is a National Road Route of Costa Rica located in the Alajuela province.

== Description ==
In Alajuela province the route covers Naranjo canton (Naranjo, San Juan, and Palmitos districts), Palmares canton (Palmares and Buenos Aires districts).
