= National Route 706 (Costa Rica) =

National Road Route in Costa Rica

National Tertiary Route 706
- Ruta nacional terciaria 706

Route information
- Maintained by Ministry of Public Works and Transport
- Length: 3.320 km (2.063 mi)

Location
- Country: Costa Rica
- Provinces: Alajuela

Highway system
- National Road Network of Costa Rica
← Route 705	→ Route 707

National Tertiary Route 706, or just Route 706 (Spanish: Ruta Nacional Terciaria 706, or Ruta 706) is a National Road Route of Costa Rica, located in the Alajuela province.

== Description ==
In Alajuela province the route covers Naranjo canton (Naranjo and Palmitos districts).
