= Palmares (canton) =

Canton in Alajuela province, Costa Rica

- Canton
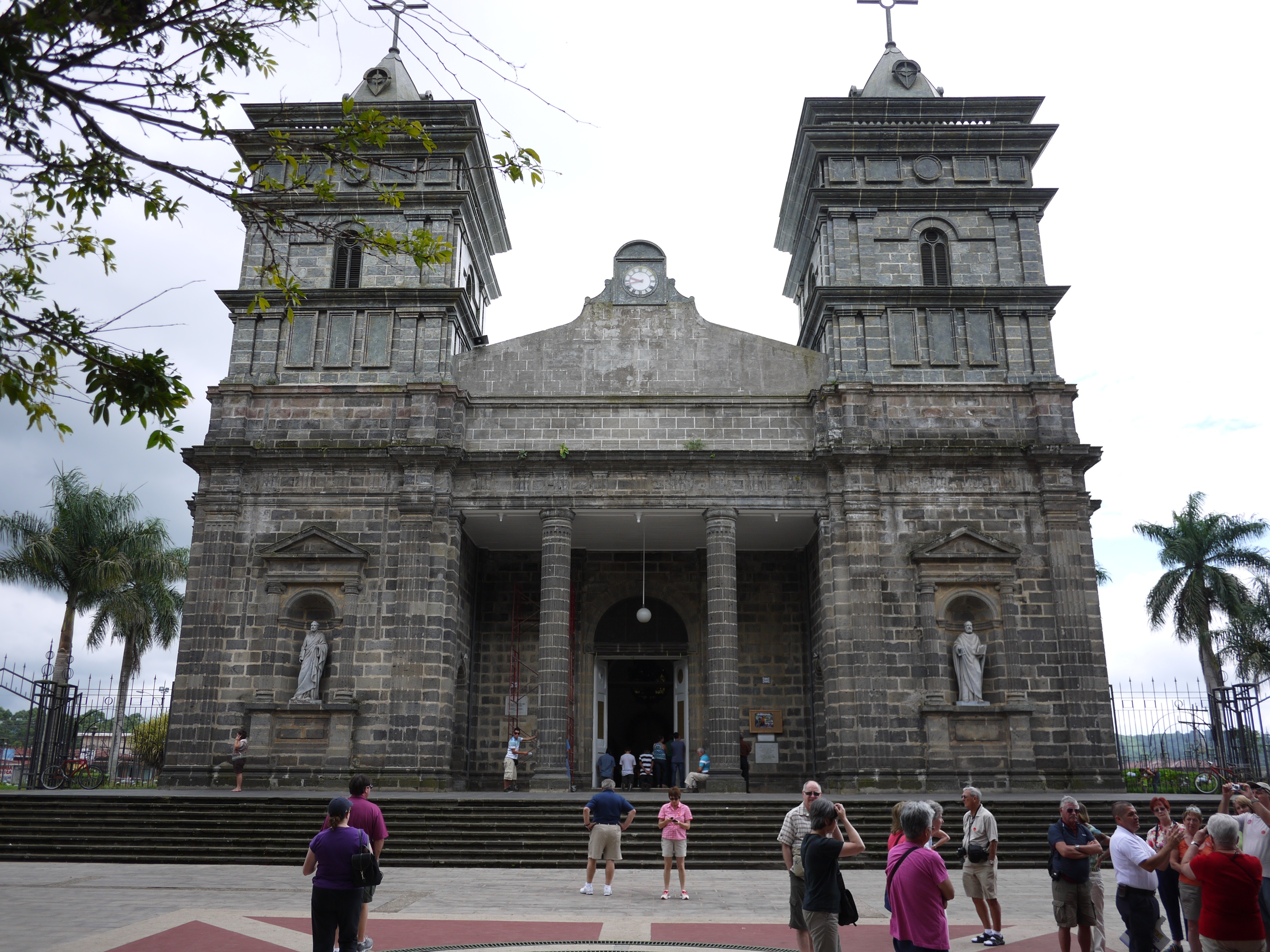
- Palmares Church

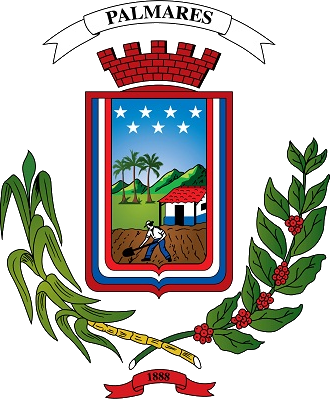
- Flag Seal
- Palmares canton
- Palmares canton location in Alajuela Province Palmares canton location in Costa Rica
- Coordinates: 10.0465715°N 84.4372672°W
- Country: Costa Rica
- Province: Alajuela
- Creation: 30 July 1888
- Head city: Palmares
- Districts: Districts: Palmares; Zaragoza; Buenos Aires; Santiago; Candelaria; Esquipulas; La Granja

Government
  - Type: Municipality
  - Body: Municipalidad de Palmares

Area
  - Total: 38.06 km^{2} (14.70 sq mi)
- Elevation: 1,028 m (3,373 ft)

Population (2022)
  - Total: 41,805
  - Density: 1,098/km^{2} (2,845/sq mi)
- Time zone: UTC−06:00
- Canton code: 207
- Website: www.munipalmares.go.cr

Palmares is a canton in the Alajuela province of Costa Rica.

== History ==
Palmares was created on 30 July 1888 by decree 68.

The first settlers in what today is Palmares are believed to have arrived in 1835 from the cities of Alajuela and Belén, looking for land where to cultivate tobacco and other products.

== Geography ==
Palmares has an area of 38.06 km^{2} and a mean elevation of 1,028 metres.

The canton encompasses a circular area with the city of Palmares at its center. The Aguacate Mountains establish the boundary on the canton's southwestern edge and the Grande River delineates the boundary on its north and northeast sides.

== Districts ==
Districts of Palmares

The canton of Palmares is subdivided into the following districts:

1. Palmares
2. Zaragoza
3. Buenos Aires
4. Santiago
5. Candelaria
6. Esquipulas
7. La Granja

== Demographics ==
Historical population
| Census | Pop. | ±% p.a. |
|---|---|---|
| 1892 | 2,770 | — |
| 1927 | 6,683 | +2.55% |
| 1950 | 7,934 | +0.75% |
| 1963 | 12,283 | +3.42% |
| 1973 | 14,495 | +1.67% |
| 1984 | 17,815 | +1.89% |
| 2000 | 29,766 | +3.26% |
| 2011 | 34,716 | +1.41% |
| 2022 | 39,148 | +1.10% |
Source: Instituto Nacional de Estadística y Censos; Centro Centroamericano de Población

The current population of the Canton from the 2022 Census is 39,148, showing almost 13% growth in the district since the 2011 census, when Palmares had a population of 34,716 inhabitants.

== Transportation ==
=== Road transportation ===
The canton is covered by the following road routes:

- National Route 1
- National Route 135
- National Route 148
- National Route 169
- National Route 713
- National Route 714
- National Route 715
