= Toro Amarillo =

District in Sarchí canton, Alajuela province, Costa Rica

- District
- Toro Amarillo district
- Toro Amarillo district location in Costa Rica
- Coordinates: 10.2228867°N 84.2876497°W
- Country: Costa Rica
- Province: Alajuela
- Canton: Sarchí

Area
  - Total: 90.93 km^{2} (35.11 sq mi)
- Elevation: 1,442 m (4,731 ft)

Population (2011)
  - Total: 273
  - Density: 3.00/km^{2} (7.78/sq mi)
- Time zone: UTC−06:00
- Postal code: 21203

Toro Amarillo is a district of the Sarchí canton, in the Alajuela province of Costa Rica.

== Geography ==
Toro Amarillo has an area of 90.93 km^{2} and an elevation of 1,442 metres.

== Demographics ==
Historical population
Census	Pop.	±% p.a.
1950	676	—
1963	348	−4.98%
1973	356	+0.23%
1984	273	−2.38%
2000	295	+0.49%
2011	273	−0.70%
2022	348	+2.23%
Source: Instituto Nacional de Estadística y Censos; Centro Centroamericano de Población

For the 2011 census, Toro Amarillo had a population of 273 inhabitants.

== Transportation ==
=== Road transportation ===
The district is covered by the following road routes:

- National Route 708
- National Route 741
