= San Jerónimo District, Naranjo =

District in Naranjo canton, Alajuela province, Costa Rica

San Jerónimo
- District
- San Jerónimo district
- San Jerónimo district location in Costa Rica
- Coordinates: 10.1284142°N 84.3527472°W
- Country: Costa Rica
- Province: Alajuela
- Canton: Naranjo

Area
  - Total: 9.12 km^{2} (3.52 sq mi)
- Elevation: 1,110 m (3,640 ft)

Population (2011)
  - Total: 3,264
  - Density: 358/km^{2} (927/sq mi)
- Time zone: UTC−06:00
- Postal code: 20605

San Jerónimo is a district of the Naranjo canton, in the Alajuela province of Costa Rica.

== Geography ==
San Jerónimo has an area of 9.12 km^{2} and an elevation of 1,110 metres.

== Demographics ==
Historical population
Census	Pop.	±% p.a.
1864	581	—
1883	538	−0.40%
1892	531	−0.15%
1927	4,083	+6.00%
1950	8,673	+3.33%
1963	884	−16.11%
1973	1,039	+1.63%
1984	1,350	+2.41%
2000	2,703	+4.43%
2011	3,264	+1.73%
2022	3,983	+1.83%
Source: Instituto Nacional de Estadística y Censos; Centro Centroamericano de Población

For the 2011 census, San Jerónimo had a population of 3,264 inhabitants.

== Transportation ==
=== Road transportation ===
The district is covered by the following road routes:

- National Route 710
