= National Route 708 (Costa Rica) =

National Road Route in Costa Rica

National Tertiary Route 708
- Ruta nacional terciaria 708

Route information
- Maintained by Ministry of Public Works and Transport
- Length: 44.500 km (27.651 mi)

Location
- Country: Costa Rica
- Provinces: Alajuela

Highway system
- National Road Network of Costa Rica
← Route 707	→ Route 709

National Tertiary Route 708, or just Route 708 (Spanish: Ruta Nacional Terciaria 708, or Ruta 708) is a National Road Route of Costa Rica, located in the Alajuela province.

== Description ==
In Alajuela province the route covers Sarchí canton (Sarchí Norte, Sarchí Sur, Toro Amarillo, and San Pedro districts) and Río Cuarto canton (Río Cuarto district).
