= Palmitos District =

District in Naranjo canton, Alajuela province, Costa Rica

Palmitos
- District
- Palmitos district
- Palmitos district location in Costa Rica
- Coordinates: 10.0974628°N 84.4244759°W
- Country: Costa Rica
- Province: Alajuela
- Canton: Naranjo
- Creation: 16 October 2008

Area
  - Total: 8.09 km^{2} (3.12 sq mi)
- Elevation: 1,055 m (3,461 ft)

Population (2011)
  - Total: 4,271
  - Density: 528/km^{2} (1,370/sq mi)
- Time zone: UTC−06:00
- Postal code: 20608

Palmitos is a district of the Naranjo canton, in the Alajuela province of Costa Rica.

== History ==
Palmitos was created on 16 October 2008 by Decreto Ejecutivo 34848-MG.

== Geography ==
Palmitos has an area of 8.09 km^{2} and an elevation of 1,055 metres.

== Demographics ==
Historical population
Census	Pop.	±% p.a.
1883	388	—
2011	4,271	+1.89%
2022	4,883	+1.22%
Source: Instituto Nacional de Estadística y Censos; Centro Centroamericano de Población

For the 2011 census, Palmitos had a population of 4,271 inhabitants.

== Transportation ==
=== Road transportation ===
The district is covered by the following road routes:

- National Route 148
- National Route 706
- National Route 726
