= National Route 714 (Costa Rica) =

National Road Route in Costa Rica

National Tertiary Route 714
- Ruta nacional terciaria 714

Route information
- Maintained by Ministry of Public Works and Transport
- Length: 5.930 km (3.685 mi)

Location
- Country: Costa Rica
- Provinces: Alajuela

Highway system
- National Road Network of Costa Rica
← Route 713	→ Route 715

National Tertiary Route 714, or just Route 714 (Spanish: Ruta Nacional Terciaria 714, or Ruta 714) is a National Road Route of Costa Rica. It is located in the Alajuela province.

== Description ==
In Alajuela province the route covers San Ramón canton (San Rafael district) and Palmares canton (Zaragoza and Santiago districts).
