= Esquipulas District =

District in Palmares canton, Alajuela province, Costa Rica

Esquipulas
- District
- Interactive map of Esquipulas
- Esquipulas district location in Costa Rica
- Coordinates: 10.0573092°N 84.4182105°W
- Country: Costa Rica
- Province: Alajuela
- Canton: Palmares

Area
  - Total: 5.41 km^{2} (2.09 sq mi)
- Elevation: 1,005 m (3,297 ft)

Population (2011)
  - Total: 6,588
  - Density: 1,220/km^{2} (3,150/sq mi)
- Time zone: UTC−06:00
- Postal code: 20706

Esquipulas is a district of the Palmares canton, in the Alajuela province of Costa Rica.

== Geography ==
Esquipulas has an area of 5.41 km^{2} and an elevation of 1,005 metres.

== Demographics ==
Historical population
Census	Pop.	±% p.a.
1892	546	—
1927	584	+0.19%
1950	797	+1.36%
1963	959	+1.43%
1973	1,200	+2.27%
1984	1,771	+3.60%
2000	3,652	+4.63%
2011	6,588	+5.51%
2022	7,813	+1.56%
Source: Instituto Nacional de Estadística y Censos; Centro Centroamericano de Población

For the 2011 census, Esquipulas had a population of 6,588 inhabitants.

== Transportation ==
=== Road transportation ===
The district is covered by the following road routes:

- National Route 715
