= National Route 169 (Costa Rica) =

National Road Route in Costa Rica

National Secondary Route 169
- Ruta nacional secundaria 169

Route information
- Maintained by Ministry of Public Works and Transport
- Length: 5.705 km (3.545 mi)

Location
- Country: Costa Rica
- Provinces: Alajuela

Highway system
- National Road Network of Costa Rica
← Route 168	→ Route 170

National Secondary Route 169, or just Route 169 (Spanish: Ruta Nacional Secundaria 169, or Ruta 169) is a National Road Route of Costa Rica located in the Alajuela province.

== Description ==
In Alajuela province the route covers San Ramón canton (San Ramón and San Isidro districts) and Palmares canton (Buenos Aires and La Granja districts).
