= National Route 709 (Costa Rica) =

National Road Route in Costa Rica

National Tertiary Route 709
- Ruta nacional terciaria 709

Route information
- Maintained by Ministry of Public Works and Transport
- Length: 10.440 km (6.487 mi)

Location
- Country: Costa Rica
- Provinces: Alajuela

Highway system
- National Road Network of Costa Rica
← Route 708	→ Route 710

National Tertiary Route 709, or just Route 709 (Spanish: Ruta Nacional Terciaria 709, or Ruta 709) is a National Road Route of Costa Rica, located in the Alajuela province.

== Description ==
In Alajuela province the route covers Naranjo canton (Naranjo and Cirrí Sur districts).
