= National Route 134 (Costa Rica) =

National Road Route in Costa Rica

National Secondary Route 134
- Ruta nacional secundaria 134

Route information
- Maintained by Ministry of Public Works and Transport
- Length: 3.820 km (2.374 mi)

Location
- Country: Costa Rica
- Provinces: Alajuela

Highway system
- National Road Network of Costa Rica
← Route 133	→ Route 135

National Secondary Route 134, or just Route 134 (Spanish: Ruta Nacional Secundaria 134, or Ruta 134) is a National Road Route of Costa Rica located in the Alajuela province.

== Description ==
In Alajuela province the route covers Atenas canton (Atenas and Concepción districts).
