= National Route 726 (Costa Rica) =

National Road Route in Costa Rica

National Tertiary Route 726
- Ruta nacional terciaria 726

Route information
- Maintained by Ministry of Public Works and Transport
- Length: 5.625 km (3.495 mi)

Location
- Country: Costa Rica
- Provinces: Alajuela

Highway system
- National Road Network of Costa Rica
← Route 725	→ Route 727

National Tertiary Route 726, or just Route 726 (Spanish: Ruta Nacional Terciaria 726, or Ruta 726) is a National Road Route of Costa Rica located in the Alajuela province.

== Description ==
In Alajuela province the route covers Naranjo canton (San Juan and Palmitos districts).
