= Cirrí Sur =

District in Naranjo canton, Alajuela province, Costa Rica

- District
- Interactive map of Cirrí Sur
- Cirrí Sur district location in Costa Rica
- Coordinates: 10.1437251°N 84.3636633°W
- Country: Costa Rica
- Province: Alajuela
- Canton: Naranjo

Area
  - Total: 32.07 km^{2} (12.38 sq mi)
- Elevation: 1,205 m (3,953 ft)

Population (2011)
  - Total: 4,552
  - Density: 141.9/km^{2} (367.6/sq mi)
- Time zone: UTC−06:00
- Postal code: 20604

Cirrí Sur is a district of the Naranjo canton, in the Alajuela province of Costa Rica.

== Geography ==
Cirrí Sur has an area of 32.07 km^{2} and an elevation of 1,205 metres.

== Demographics ==
Historical population
Census	Pop.	±% p.a.
1883	538	—
1892	755	+3.84%
1950	1,233	+0.85%
1963	1,389	+0.92%
1973	1,603	+1.44%
1984	2,394	+3.71%
2000	3,790	+2.91%
2011	4,552	+1.68%
2022	5,125	+1.08%
Source: Instituto Nacional de Estadística y Censos; Centro Centroamericano de Población

For the 2011 census, Cirrí Sur had a population of 4,552 inhabitants.

== Transportation ==
=== Road transportation ===
The district is covered by the following road routes:

- National Route 141
- National Route 703
- National Route 709
- National Route 710
