= National Route 707 (Costa Rica) =

National Road Route in Costa Rica

National Tertiary Route 707
- Ruta nacional terciaria 707

Route information
- Maintained by Ministry of Public Works and Transport
- Length: 24.645 km (15.314 mi)

Location
- Country: Costa Rica
- Provinces: San José, Alajuela

Highway system
- National Road Network of Costa Rica
← Route 706	→ Route 708

National Tertiary Route 707, or just Route 707 (Spanish: Ruta Nacional Terciaria 707, or Ruta 707) is a National Road Route of Costa Rica, located in the San José, Alajuela provinces.

== Description ==
In San José province the route covers Turrubares canton (San Pablo district).

In Alajuela province the route covers Atenas canton (Atenas, Jesús, and Escobal districts).
