= Zaragoza District =

District in Palmares canton, Alajuela province, Costa Rica

Zaragoza
- District
- Zaragoza district
- Zaragoza district location in Costa Rica
- Coordinates: 10.0338318°N 84.4410146°W
- Country: Costa Rica
- Province: Alajuela
- Canton: Palmares

Area
  - Total: 8.34 km^{2} (3.22 sq mi)
- Elevation: 1,010 m (3,310 ft)

Population (2011)
  - Total: 8,219
  - Density: 985/km^{2} (2,550/sq mi)
- Time zone: UTC−06:00
- Postal code: 20702

Zaragoza is a district of the Palmares canton, in the Alajuela province of Costa Rica.

== Geography ==
Zaragoza has an area of 8.34 km^{2} and an elevation of 1,010 metres.

== Demographics ==
Historical population
Census	Pop.	±% p.a.
1892	562	—
1927	1,603	+3.04%
1950	2,003	+0.97%
1963	3,182	+3.62%
1973	3,462	+0.85%
1984	4,136	+1.63%
2000	7,493	+3.78%
2011	8,219	+0.84%
2022	10,453	+2.21%
Source: Instituto Nacional de Estadística y Censos; Centro Centroamericano de Población

For the 2011 census, Zaragoza had a population of 8,219 inhabitants.

== Transportation ==
=== Road transportation ===
The district is covered by the following road routes:

- National Route 135
- National Route 713
- National Route 714
- National Route 715
