= Santa Eulalia District, Atenas =

District in Atenas canton, Alajuela province, Costa Rica

Santa Eulalia
- District
- Santa Eulalia district
- Santa Eulalia district location in Costa Rica
- Coordinates: 10.0156949°N 84.3728823°W
- Country: Costa Rica
- Province: Alajuela
- Canton: Atenas

Area
  - Total: 14.59 km^{2} (5.63 sq mi)
- Elevation: 709 m (2,326 ft)

Population (2011)
  - Total: 2,082
  - Density: 142.7/km^{2} (369.6/sq mi)
- Time zone: UTC−06:00
- Postal code: 20507

Santa Eulalia is a district of the Atenas canton, in the Alajuela province of Costa Rica.

== Geography ==
Santa Eulalia has an area of 14.59 km^{2} and an elevation of 709 metres.

== Demographics ==
Historical population
Census	Pop.	±% p.a.
1892	371	—
1950	607	+0.85%
1963	766	+1.81%
1973	960	+2.28%
1984	975	+0.14%
2000	1,670	+3.42%
2011	2,082	+2.02%
2022	2,626	+2.13%
Source: Instituto Nacional de Estadística y Censos; Centro Centroamericano de Población

For the 2011 census, Santa Eulalia had a population of 2,082 inhabitants.

== Transportation ==
=== Road transportation ===
The district is covered by the following road routes:

- National Route 135
- National Route 716
