= Atenas =

District in Atenas canton, Alajuela, Costa Rica

- District
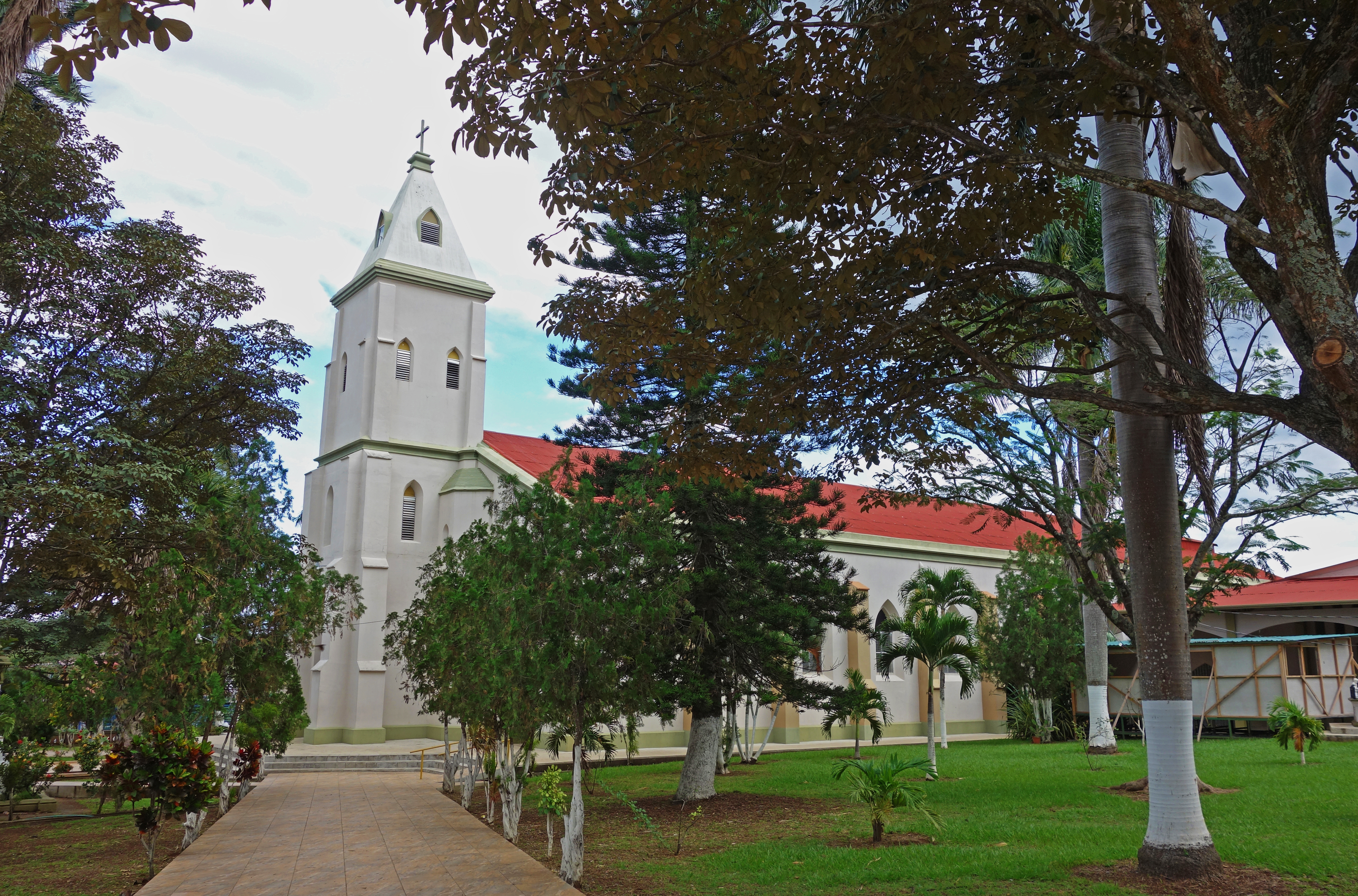
- Catholic church in central Atenas
- Interactive map of Atenas
- Atenas district location in Costa Rica
- Coordinates: 9.97857°N 84.3685463°W
- Country: Costa Rica
- Province: Alajuela
- Canton: Atenas

Area
  - Total: 9.76 km^{2} (3.77 sq mi)
- Elevation: 698 m (2,290 ft)

Population (2011)
  - Total: 7,546
  - Density: 773/km^{2} (2,000/sq mi)
- Time zone: UTC−06:00
- Postal code: 20501
- Climate: Aw

Atenas (Spanish pronunciation: [aˈtenas]) is a district of the Atenas canton, in the Alajuela province of Costa Rica. Its urban area is referred as Atenas city.

== Toponymy ==
Its name means Athens (Αθήνα), the capital of Greece.

== Geography ==
Atenas has an area of 9.76 km^{2} and an elevation of 698 metres. It is located on the western edge of the Central Valley (Valle Central), 25 kilometers southwest of the provincial capital city of Alajuela, 20 kilometers from Juan Santamaria International Airport, and 35 kilometers from the national capital city of San Jose.

The altitude in Atenas varies from 300 meters above sea level in the Balsa and Rio Grande areas ascending to up to 1,200 meters above sea level in the San Isidro area. This wide range creates well-defined climatic subregions within the greater Atenas area.

The town is surrounded by mountains and coffee plantations and comprises a prosperous agricultural area which hosts a weekly farmer's market on Thursday afternoons and Friday mornings. The town center features a church and a park lined with palm trees along with a community health center, pharmacies, doctors, dentists, tennis court, fitness center, swimming pools, parks, banks, shops, bed-and-breakfasts, and restaurants in the village.

Atenas is a popular place for North American and European retirees.

There are four major real estate developments with existing homes and building lots: Roca Verde, Vista Atenas, Lomas Al Paraiso and Hacienda Atenas. There are other real estate developments in various stages of completion.

In mid-October 2011, a major landslide occurred on the Atenas exit of Autopista del Sol. The exit has since re-opened improving travel time to San José, Escazú and Pacific beaches.

== Climate ==
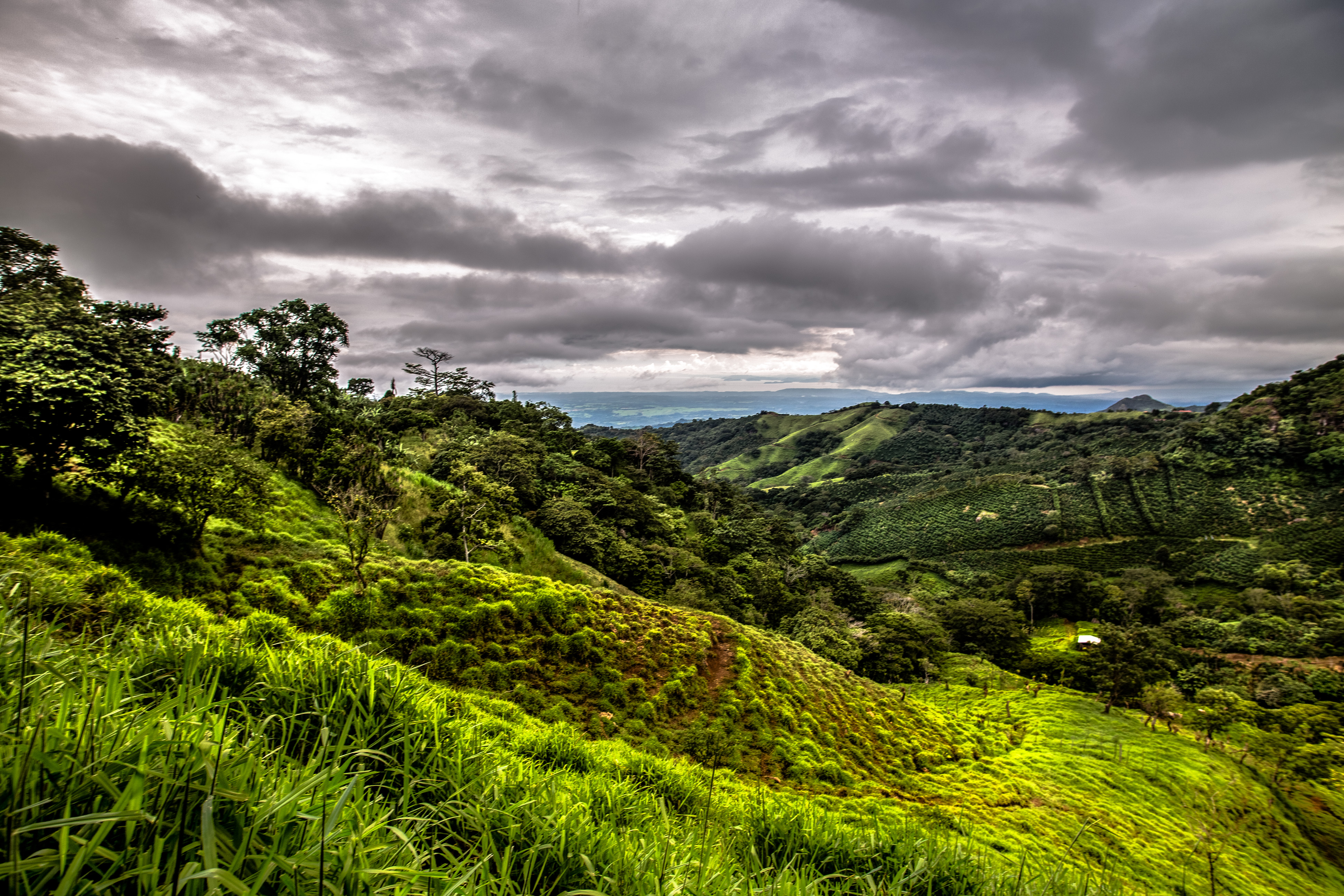
Pasture lands with Nicoya Peninsula in the background as seen from Estanquillos

A 1960 National Geographic article proclaimed that Atenas was once considered to have the "el mejor clima del mundo" ("best climate in the world"); the reason for this attribution is that climatic factors like temperature and humidity are stable all year round, with temperatures ranging from 19 Celsius at night to 34 Celsius during the day with a yearly average of 26 Celsius.

== Demographics ==
Historical population
Census	Pop.	±% p.a.
1864	569	—
1883	853	+2.15%
1892	811	−0.56%
1927	1,648	+2.05%
1950	2,204	+1.27%
1963	2,962	+2.30%
1973	3,592	+1.95%
1984	4,451	+1.97%
2000	7,182	+3.04%
2011	7,546	+0.45%
2022	7,818	+0.32%
Source: Instituto Nacional de Estadística y Censos; Centro Centroamericano de Población

For the 2011 census, Atenas had a population of 7,546 inhabitants.

== Transportation ==
=== Road transportation ===
The district is covered by the following road routes:

- National Route 3
- National Route 134
- National Route 135
- National Route 707
