= Sarchí (canton) =

Canton in Alajuela province, Costa Rica

- Canton
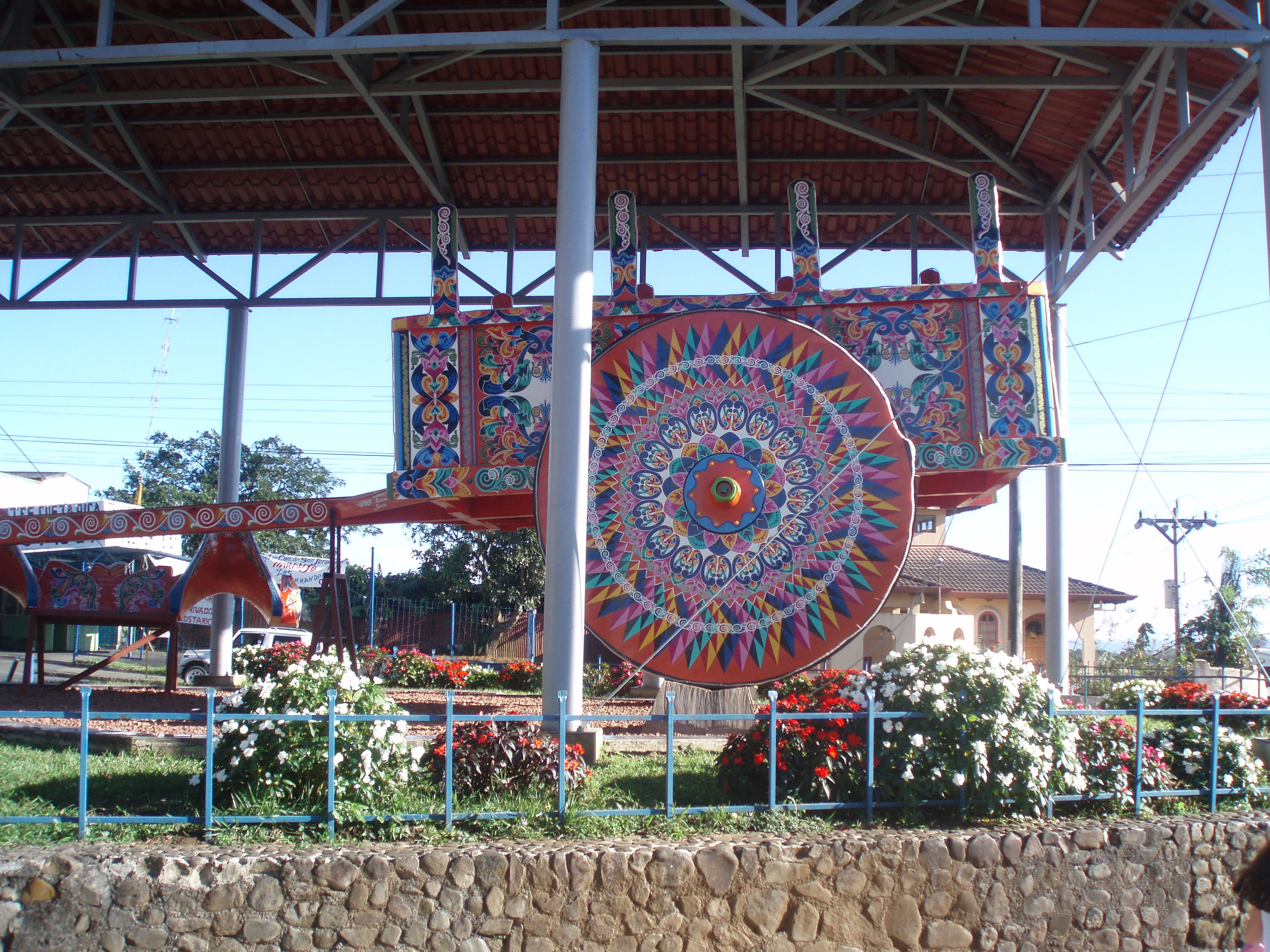
- World's Largest Oxcart, Sarchí

- Flag
- Sarchí canton
- Sarchí canton location in Alajuela Province Sarchí canton location in Costa Rica
- Coordinates: 10.1626074°N 84.2926371°W
- Country: Costa Rica
- Province: Alajuela
- Creation: 26 October 1949
- Head city: Sarchí Norte
- Districts: Districts: Sarchí Norte; Sarchí Sur; Toro Amarillo; San Pedro; Rodríguez

Government
  - Type: Municipality
  - Body: Municipalidad de Sarchí

Area
  - Total: 120.25 km^{2} (46.43 sq mi)
- Elevation: 970 m (3,180 ft)

Population (2011)
  - Total: 18,085
  - Density: 150.40/km^{2} (389.52/sq mi)
- Time zone: UTC−06:00
- Canton code: 212
- Website: www.munisarchi.go.cr

Sarchí is a canton in the Alajuela province of Costa Rica. The head city is in Sarchí Norte district.

== Toponymy ==
The Sarchí word means Open Field in the Huetar language of the Huetar people that once inhabited the area.

On 7 August 2019, by Law 9658, the canton changed its previous name from Valverde Vega to Sarchí.

== History ==
Sarchí was created on 26 October 1949 by decree 766. It was originally named Valverde Vega in honor of Dr. Carlos Luis Valverde Vega (1903-1948), a native of San Ramón, physician and founder of the Unión Médica Nacional (National Medical Union) after more than forty years of struggle. The members of the board that worked to create it were Samuel Alfaro Alpízar, Efraím Zamora Castro, Daube Alfaro Castro, Pedro Alfaro Zamora, Hebly Inkseter Soto, Otoniel Alfaro Alfaro, Elécer Pérez Conejo, who are known today as its founders. The canton was inaugurated on 1 January 1950.

== Geography ==
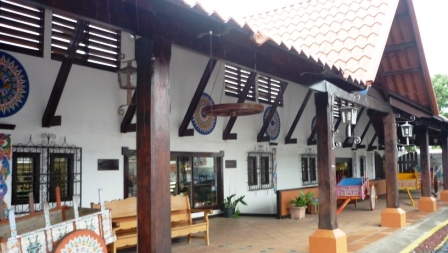
Sarchi is the cradle of the craft of Costa Rica and has many factories and shops that an important visit for tourists

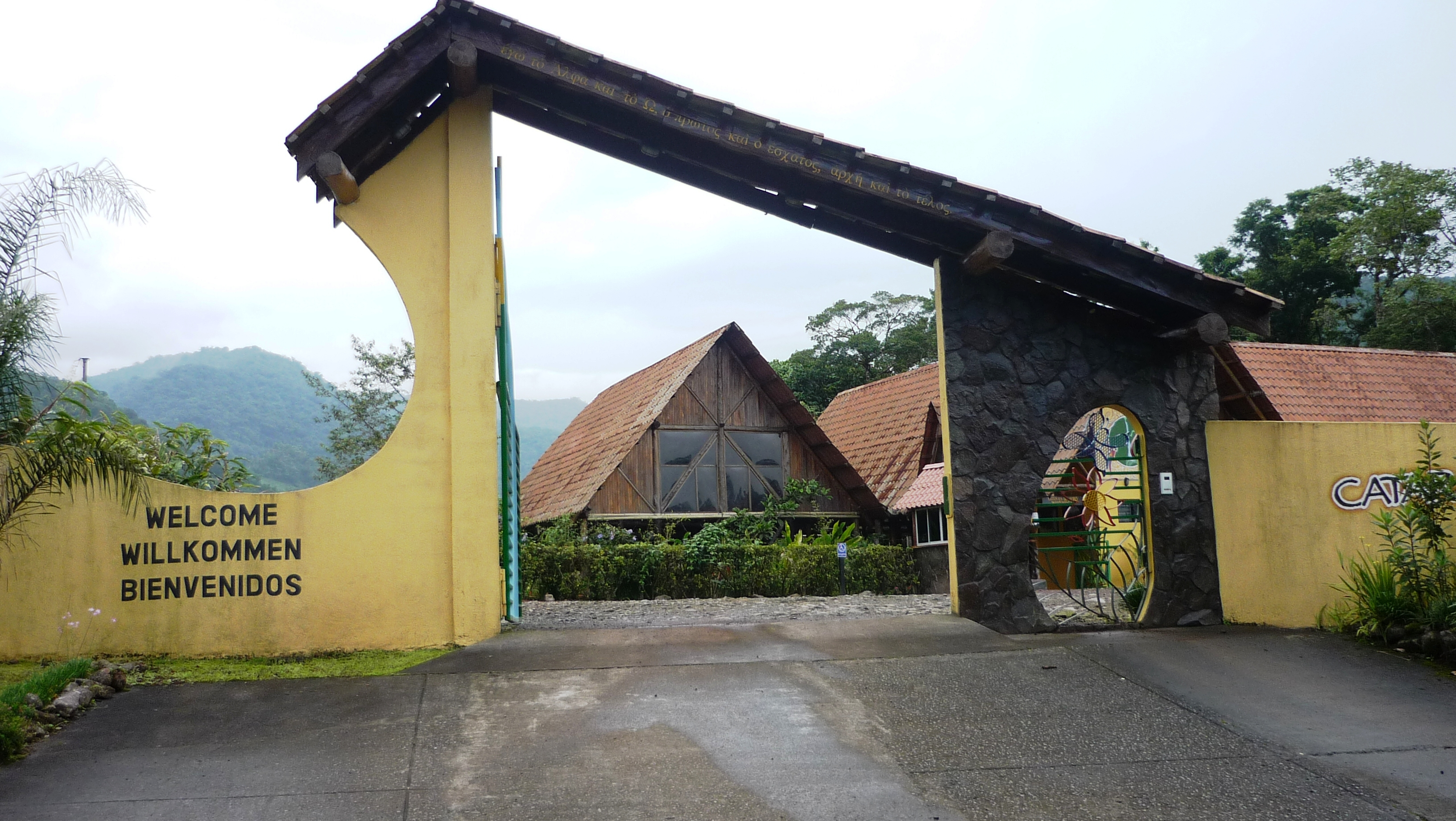
In Toro Amarillo is the spectacular Toro's Waterfall with an exotic hotel designed by famed Arq. Ibo Bonilla

Sarchí has an area of 120.25 km^{2} and a mean elevation of 1,116 metres.

The elongated canton lies between the Molino and Toro rivers on the northwest and the Sarchí River on the southeast. It reaches northward into a beautiful high valley of the Cordillera Central (Central Mountain Range) between the Poás and Platanar volcanoes.

== Districts ==
The canton of Sarchí is subdivided into the following districts:

1. Sarchí Norte
2. Sarchí Sur
3. Toro Amarillo
4. San Pedro
5. Rodríguez

== Demographics ==
Historical population
Census	Pop.	±% p.a.
1950	4,313	—
1963	6,546	+3.26%
1973	8,707	+2.89%
1984	10,716	+1.91%
2000	16,239	+2.63%
2011	18,085	+0.98%
2022	21,562	+1.61%
Source: Instituto Nacional de Estadística y Censos; Centro Centroamericano de Población

For the 2011 census, Sarchí had a population of 18,085 inhabitants.

== Transportation ==
=== Road transportation ===
The canton is covered by the following road routes:

- National Route 118
- National Route 708
- National Route 710
- National Route 741
