= San Isidro District, Atenas =

District in Atenas canton, Alajuela province, Costa Rica

San Isidro
- District
- San Isidro district
- San Isidro district location in Costa Rica
- Coordinates: 9.9950719°N 84.4299393°W
- Country: Costa Rica
- Province: Alajuela
- Canton: Atenas

Area
  - Total: 14.48 km^{2} (5.59 sq mi)
- Elevation: 1,000 m (3,300 ft)

Population (2011)
  - Total: 2,813
  - Density: 194.3/km^{2} (503.2/sq mi)
- Time zone: UTC−06:00
- Postal code: 20504

San Isidro is a district of the Atenas canton, in the Alajuela province of Costa Rica.

== Geography ==
San Isidro has an area of 14.48 km^{2} and an elevation of 1,000 metres.

== Demographics ==
Historical population
Census	Pop.	±% p.a.
1892	487	—
1927	873	+1.68%
1950	1,282	+1.68%
1963	1,539	+1.42%
1973	1,867	+1.95%
1984	1,891	+0.12%
2000	2,496	+1.75%
2011	2,813	+1.09%
2022	3,342	+1.58%
Source: Instituto Nacional de Estadística y Censos; Centro Centroamericano de Población

For the 2011 census, San Isidro had a population of 2,813 inhabitants.

== Transportation ==
=== Road transportation ===
The district is covered by the following road routes:
