= San Miguel District, Naranjo =

District in Naranjo canton, Alajuela province, Costa Rica

San Miguel
- District
- San Miguel district
- San Miguel district location in Costa Rica
- Coordinates: 10.0636715°N 84.3913523°W
- Country: Costa Rica
- Province: Alajuela
- Canton: Naranjo

Area
  - Total: 15.52 km^{2} (5.99 sq mi)
- Elevation: 1,040 m (3,410 ft)

Population (2011)
  - Total: 4,657
  - Density: 300.1/km^{2} (777.2/sq mi)
- Time zone: UTC−06:00
- Postal code: 20602

San Miguel is a district of the Naranjo canton, in the Alajuela province of Costa Rica.

== Geography ==
San Miguel has an area of 15.52 km^{2} and an elevation of 1,040 metres.

== Demographics ==
Historical population
Census	Pop.	±% p.a.
1883	717	—
1892	805	+1.29%
1927	2,190	+2.90%
1950	1,682	−1.14%
1963	2,498	+3.09%
1973	1,357	−5.92%
1984	1,546	+1.19%
2000	3,532	+5.30%
2011	4,657	+2.55%
2022	5,444	+1.43%
Source: Instituto Nacional de Estadística y Censos; Centro Centroamericano de Población

For the 2011 census, San Miguel had a population of 4,657 inhabitants.

== Transportation ==
=== Road transportation ===
The district is covered by the following road routes:

- National Route 1
- National Route 141
- National Route 715
