= Mercedes District, Atenas =

District in Atenas canton, Alajuela province, Costa Rica

Mercedes
- District
- Interactive map of Mercedes
- Mercedes district location in Costa Rica
- Coordinates: 9.9870364°N 84.3991291°W
- Country: Costa Rica
- Province: Alajuela
- Canton: Atenas

Area
  - Total: 7.81 km^{2} (3.02 sq mi)
- Elevation: 720 m (2,360 ft)

Population (2011)
  - Total: 3,127
  - Density: 400/km^{2} (1,040/sq mi)
- Time zone: UTC−06:00
- Postal code: 20503

Mercedes is a district of the Atenas canton, in the Alajuela province of Costa Rica.

== Geography ==
Mercedes has an area of 7.81 km^{2} and an elevation of 720 metres.

== Demographics ==
Historical population
Census	Pop.	±% p.a.
1864	589	—
1883	880	+2.14%
1892	878	−0.03%
1927	900	+0.07%
1950	1,004	+0.48%
1963	1,103	+0.73%
1973	1,191	+0.77%
1984	1,506	+2.16%
2000	2,691	+3.69%
2011	3,127	+1.37%
2022	3,890	+2.00%
Source: Instituto Nacional de Estadística y Censos; Centro Centroamericano de Población

For the 2011 census, Mercedes had a population of 3,127 inhabitants.

== Transportation ==
=== Road transportation ===
The district is covered by the following road routes:

- National Route 135
