= Santiago District, Paraguay =

District of Misiones Department, Paraguay

Santiago District is one of the districts of Misiones Department, Paraguay.
