= Sarchí Norte =

District in Sarchí canton, Alajuela province, Costa Rica

- District
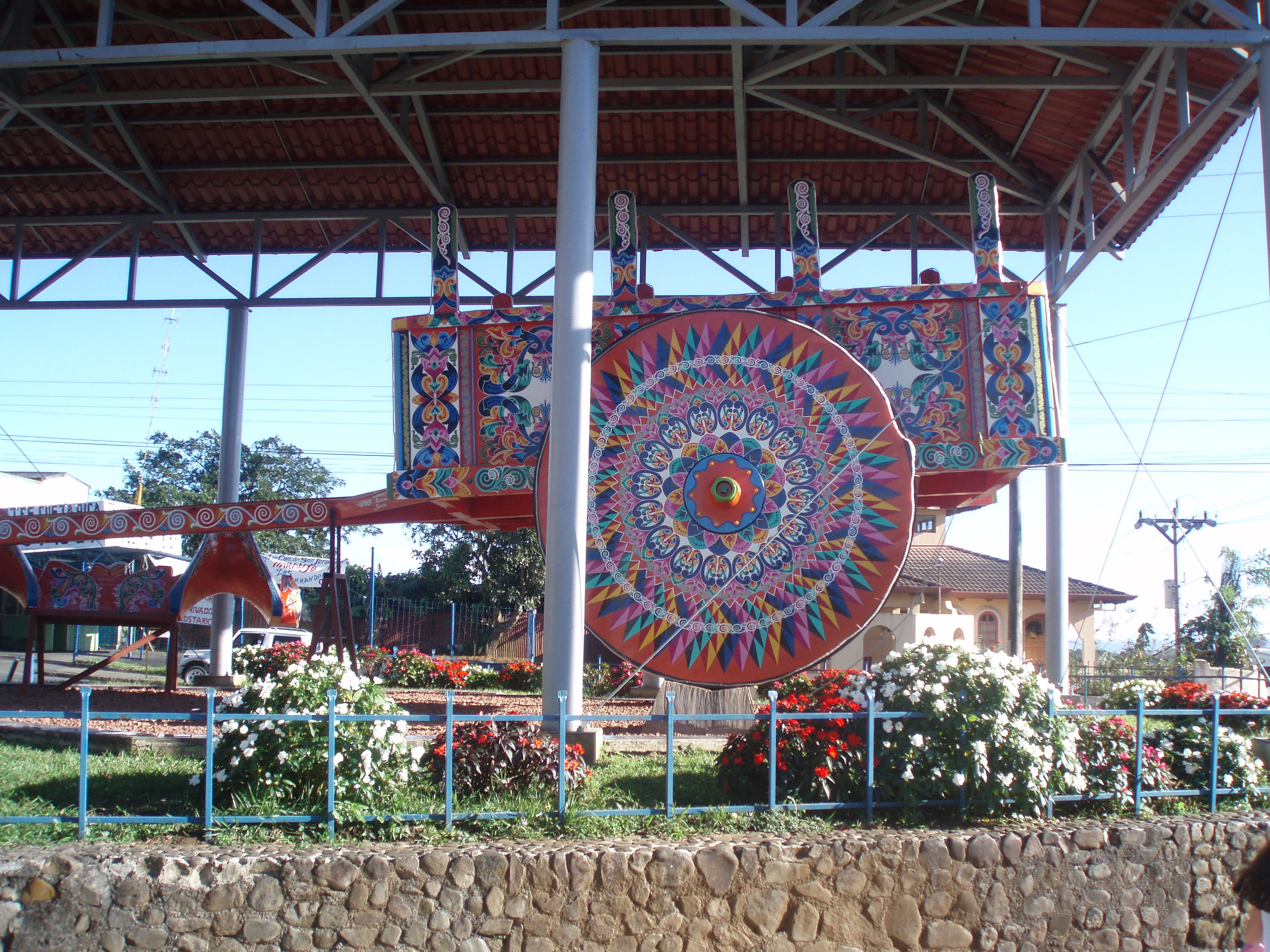
- World's Largest Oxcart
- Sarchí Norte district
- Sarchí Norte district location in Costa Rica
- Coordinates: 10.1257679°N 84.3209068°W
- Country: Costa Rica
- Province: Alajuela
- Canton: Sarchí

Area
  - Total: 21.3 km^{2} (8.2 sq mi)
- Elevation: 970 m (3,180 ft)

Population (2011)
  - Total: 7,140
  - Density: 335/km^{2} (868/sq mi)
- Time zone: UTC−06:00
- Postal code: 21201

Sarchí Norte is a district of the Sarchí canton, in the Alajuela province of Costa Rica.

== History ==
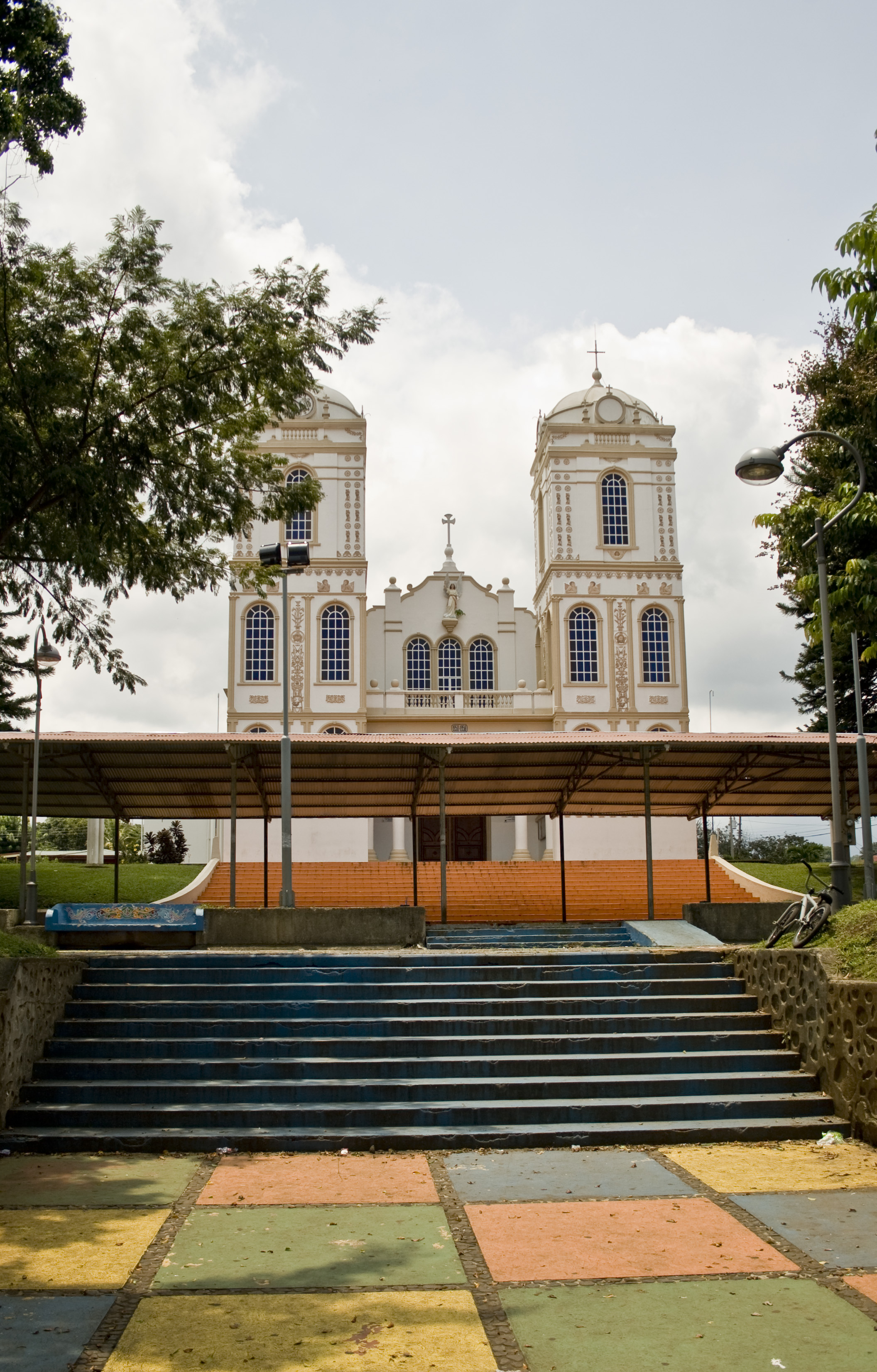
Church of Sarchi

Sarchí is Costa Rica's most famous crafts center. The town offers more than 200 stores and small family-operated woodworking factories producing wooden bowls and other tableware, fold-up rocking chairs of wood and leather, and a wide variety of kitschy items. The most popular items on sale are "carretas", elaborately painted oxcarts that traditionally carried coffee from the highlands down to the port on the Pacific coast.

It was also the place where serial furniture manufacture started in Costa Rica, around 1890 decade with a design of Daniel Alfaro Corrales, and later mass-produced by his brother Pedro Juvenal Alfaro Corrales, those furnitures, in special the chairs are known as "sillas sarchí" and are easily recognized because most of the parts were turned. Eloy Alfaro Corrales, the youngest brother was partner with Pedro Juvenal, but later started his own business of Oxcart making when he bought the workshop of Sem Perez who in turn bought it from Hacienda La Eva

Around 1900-03 Daniel Alfaro Corrales also designed the modern and improved oxcart including the segmented wooden wheel in use today from the previous very crude and primitive platform known as "Cureña", in the particular case of the wheel is stronger than the original one piece, or the lightly improved three pieces design.

The canton was established by a decree Number 766 on October 26, 1949. It is named in honor of Dr. Carlos Luis Valverde Vega, a medic and founder of the Unión Médica Nacional (National Medical Union) who was the first death of the 1948 revolution. The members of the board that struggle to accomplish it are: Samuel Alfaro Alpízar, Efraím Zamora Castro, Dauve Alfaro Castro, Pedro Alfaro Zamora, Hebly Inkseter Soto, Otoniel Alfaro Alfaro and Eliécer Pérez Conejo and they are known today as the founders. The Canton was inaugurated on January 1, 1950, after several years of struggle.

Originally was settled by Ambrosio José Avilés del Jesús Alfaro Godines in the first half of 19th century, the earliest reference to it in 1836 The original nahuatl name Sarchí means "potrero" or open field used to keep horses and cattle, the first settlers found it in that condition, and surrounded by tropical rain forest. Reference from Evly Inksetter, the first county historian. The name of Sarchí comes from the Aztec word "xalachi", which means "relax place" or "down the sand place" The town was granted the title of "ciudad" (city) by a law of September 21, 1963.

== Geography ==
Sarchí Norte has an area of 21.3 km^{2} and an elevation of 970 metres.

It is located on the slopes of the Cordillera Central (Central Mountain Range) at the eastern edge of the Central Valley. It is 27 kilometers northwest of the provincial capital city of Alajuela, and 46 kilometers from the national capital city of San Jose.

== Places of interest ==
- Church: One of Costa Rica's most beautiful houses of worship, this "wedding cake" church features a vaulted hardwood ceiling and carvings contributed by local artisans. (Sarchí Norte).
- Mercado de Artesanías: A large warehouse-like store selling crafts of all kinds, operated by a Craftsmen's cooperative. (on the edge of Sarchí Norte, along the road to Naranjo and next to the gas station)
- Taller Eloy Alfaro (He was known in the town as "Don Lolo"): a workshop that produces oxcarts using machinery powered by a waterwheel, with most of same machines used in the manufacturing of oxcarts from the late 19th century in the original workshop in Hacienda la Eva.
- World's Largest Oxcart: A huge, brightly painted carreta that sits in the Parque Central in front of the church in Sarchí Norte. It was built in 2006 in order to get the name of the town into The Guinness Book of World Records. The plan was a success.
- Botanical Garden Else Kientzler: The Botanical Garden is home to over 2,000 different plants from around the world. They are perfectly suited for recreation, education and ecotourism. The Botanical Garden is spread over 7 hectares (17 acres).

== Activities of interest ==
- Typical dances: every September 15 people come to park to enjoy the typical dances; all of this is carried out in front of the church.
- Patronal parties: on July 25 patronal parties are Celebrated in honor of our patron Santiago (Saint Jack) and people prepare typical foods and sell them.

== Demographics ==
Historical population
Census	Pop.	±% p.a.
1864	934	—
1883	739	−1.22%
1892	1,032	+3.78%
1927	1,539	+1.15%
1950	1,979	+1.10%
1963	3,755	+5.05%
1973	3,525	−0.63%
1984	4,336	+1.90%
2000	6,470	+2.53%
2011	7,140	+0.90%
2022	8,306	+1.38%
Source: Instituto Nacional de Estadística y Censos; Centro Centroamericano de Población

For the 2011 census, Sarchí Norte had a population of 7,140 inhabitants.

== Famous people ==
- Ibo Bonilla Oconitrillo, sculptor, architect, mathematician and business manager
- Daniel Alfaro Corrales, designer of the "Sarchi furniture" and the modern Costa Rican oxcart c.1900

== Transportation ==
=== Road transportation ===
The district is covered by the following road routes:

- National Route 118
- National Route 708
- National Route 710
