= San Isidro District, San Ramón =

District in San Ramón canton, Alajuela province, Costa Rica

San Isidro
- District
- San Isidro district
- San Isidro district location in Costa Rica
- Coordinates: 10.083344°N 84.4494512°W
- Country: Costa Rica
- Province: Alajuela
- Canton: San Ramón

Area
  - Total: 8.72 km^{2} (3.37 sq mi)
- Elevation: 1,140 m (3,740 ft)

Population (2011)
  - Total: 4,478
  - Density: 514/km^{2} (1,330/sq mi)
- Time zone: UTC−06:00
- Postal code: 20207

San Isidro is a district of the San Ramón canton, in the Alajuela province of Costa Rica.

== Geography ==
San Isidro has an area of 8.72 km^{2} (3.37 sq mi) and an elevation of 1,140 metres (3,740 ft).

== Demographics ==
Historical population
Census	Pop.	±% p.a.
1883	390	—
1892	707	+6.83%
1927	681	−0.11%
1950	823	+0.83%
1963	1,149	+2.60%
1973	1,226	+0.65%
1984	1,281	+0.40%
2000	3,553	+6.58%
2011	4,478	+2.13%
2022	5,621	+2.09%
Source: Instituto Nacional de Estadística y Censos; Centro Centroamericano de Población

For the 2011 census, San Isidro had a population of 4,478 inhabitants.

== Transportation ==
=== Road transportation ===
The district is covered by the following road routes:

- National Route 1
- National Route 135
- National Route 169
