= Naranjo de Alajuela =

District in Naranjo canton, Alajuela province, Costa Rica

Naranjo
- District
- Naranjo district
- Naranjo district location in Costa Rica
- Coordinates: 10.1001475°N 84.3900771°W
- Country: Costa Rica
- Province: Alajuela
- Canton: Naranjo

Area
  - Total: 17.26 km^{2} (6.66 sq mi)
- Elevation: 1,043 m (3,422 ft)

Population (2011)
  - Total: 15,936
  - Density: 923.3/km^{2} (2,391/sq mi)
- Time zone: UTC−06:00
- Postal code: 20601

Naranjo is a district of the Naranjo canton, in the Alajuela province of Costa Rica.

== Geography ==
Naranjo has an area of 17.26 km^{2} and an elevation of 1,043 metres. It is in the Central Valley (Valle Central), 31 kilometers northwest of the provincial capital city of Alajuela, and 47 kilometers from the national capital city of San Jose. It is also in close proximity to Ciudad Quesada, the Northern Lowlands, Monteverde, Guanacaste, and Arenal.

== Demographics ==
Historical population
Census	Pop.	±% p.a.
1864	1,612	—
1883	1,126	−1.87%
1892	1,607	+4.03%
1927	4,448	+2.95%
1950	6,448	+1.63%
1963	9,781	+3.26%
1973	9,905	+0.13%
1984	11,600	+1.45%
2000	18,514	+2.97%
2011	15,936	−1.35%
2022	16,433	+0.28%
Source: Instituto Nacional de Estadística y Censos; Centro Centroamericano de Población

For the 2011 census, Naranjo had a population of 15,936 inhabitants.

== Transportation ==
=== Road transportation ===
The district is covered by the following road routes:

- National Route 118
- National Route 141
- National Route 148
- National Route 706
- National Route 709
- National Route 715
- National Route 725

== Notable people ==
- Brandon Aguilera, footballer.
