= Buenos Aires District, Palmares =

District in Palmares canton, Alajuela province, Costa Rica

Buenos Aires
- District
- Interactive map of Buenos Aires
- Buenos Aires district location in Costa Rica
- Coordinates: 10.0705043°N 84.4317953°W
- Country: Costa Rica
- Province: Alajuela
- Canton: Palmares

Area
  - Total: 6.88 km^{2} (2.66 sq mi)
- Elevation: 1,012 m (3,320 ft)

Population (2011)
  - Total: 7,493
  - Density: 1,090/km^{2} (2,820/sq mi)
- Time zone: UTC−06:00
- Postal code: 20703

Buenos Aires is a district of the Palmares canton, in the Alajuela province of Costa Rica.

== Geography ==
Buenos Aires has an area of 6.88 km^{2} and an elevation of 1,012 metres.

== Demographics ==
Historical population
Census	Pop.	±% p.a.
1892	565	—
1927	1,585	+2.99%
1950	1,904	+0.80%
1963	3,235	+4.16%
1973	2,622	−2.08%
1984	3,096	+1.52%
2000	6,879	+5.12%
2011	7,493	+0.78%
2022	8,034	+0.64%
Source: Instituto Nacional de Estadística y Censos; Centro Centroamericano de Población

For the 2011 census, Buenos Aires had a population of 7,493 inhabitants.

== Transportation ==
=== Road transportation ===
The district is covered by the following road routes:

- National Route 1
- National Route 135
- National Route 148
- National Route 169
