= Philippe Sarchi =

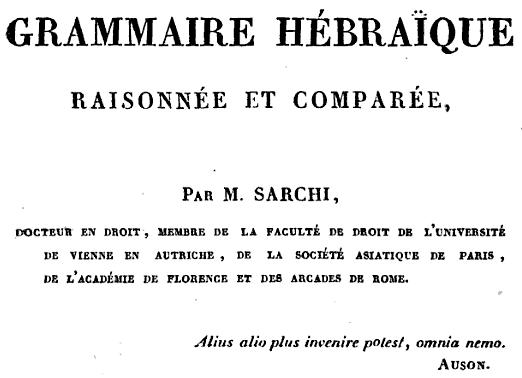

François Philippe Sarchi originally Samuel Morpurgo, born in Gradisca d'Isonzo, Habsburg monarchy, Holy Roman Empire in 1764 and died in Paris in 1830, was a lawyer, linguist, philologist of Illyrian origin, specializing in Italian and Hebrew.

After a legal and linguistic training, he became a professor at the University of Vienna; he wrote various books on language, grammar and Italian poetry. He was a notary in Trieste, then linguist and translator in Paris and London.

He then devoted himself to the study of literature and Hebrew philology. His main work on the subject is a book on Hebrew poetry and a Hebrew grammar.

== Works ==
(Only original works by Sarchi are shown, not his translations)

- 1795: (in German) Theoretisch-praktische italienische Sprachlehre, Vienna; reprint in 1805.
- 1795: (in Italian) Grammatica italiana, Vienne, Schmidt, 1795; 3rd reprint 1805.
- 1797: (in Italian) Ape poetica o il fior da fiore delle migliorie poesie italiane, Vienna.
- 1811: (in Italian) Elementi di Geografia moderna per uso di giovinette in versi rimati, Udine.
- 1817: An almanac, sundries, in the Israélite français (2 volumes, Paris), in La Minerve littéraire and in various newspapers and magazines.
- 1823: Cours de thèmes italiens, Paris, Th. Barrois et Jombert, (reprit Paris, 1823).
- 1824: (in English) An Essay on Hebrew Poetry ancient and modern, London online; several repr.; last edition: Kessinger Publishing, LLC, 2009 ISBN 1-104-67531-5, 9781104675318.
- 1827: Grammaire hébraïque raisonnée et comparée, Paris, Dondey-Dupré; several editions, alternately under the same name or under the name Nouvelle grammaire hébraïque raisonnée et comparée, Paris, Dondey-Dupré, 1827 and 1828 Read online; Paris, Pélicier et Chatet, 1828, 1830 ... 1844.

== Bibliography and sources ==
- Asher Salah (2007). La république des lettres: rabbins, écrivains et médecins juifs en Italie au XVIII. Studies in Jewish history and culture. Brill. pp. 453–454. ISBN 978-9004156425. Salah2007..
- Del Bianco Cotrozzi, Maddalena (1993). "Raccolta di studi giudaici in memoria di Angelo Vivian" (in Italian). Bologna: Associazione Italiana per lo Studio del Giudaismo, Edizioni Fattoadarte. pp. 199–231..
- Guy Delavau, Franchet (1829). "Le Livre noir, ou Répertoire alphabétique de la police politique sous le ministère déplorable". Paris: Moutardier. pp. 113–118. Delavau et Franchet1829.; contains five requests for investigation and four police reports Philippe Sarchi, from October 1825 to October 1827.
- "Bibliotheca Judaica: bibliographisches Handbuch der gesammten jüdischen literatur..." (in German). Dr Julius Fürst, Wilhelm Engelmann. 1863..
- Joseph-Marie Quérard (1836). "La France Littéraire, dictionnaire bibliographique". Paris: Firmin-Didot. p. 450..
- Cusin, Silvio G.; Ioly Zorattini, Pier Cesare (1998). Friuli Venezia Giulia; Jewish itineraries : places, history and art. Marseille. p. 65. ISBN 883177011X..
- Salomon Wininger (1925–1936). Grosse Jüdische National-Biographie (in German). Cernauti: Druck Orient..
- Cahen, Samuel (1840). Archives israélites de France. pp. 38, 40, 45..

== See also ==
- Modern Hebrew grammar
- Hebrew
