= Édgar Brenes =

Costa Rican architect

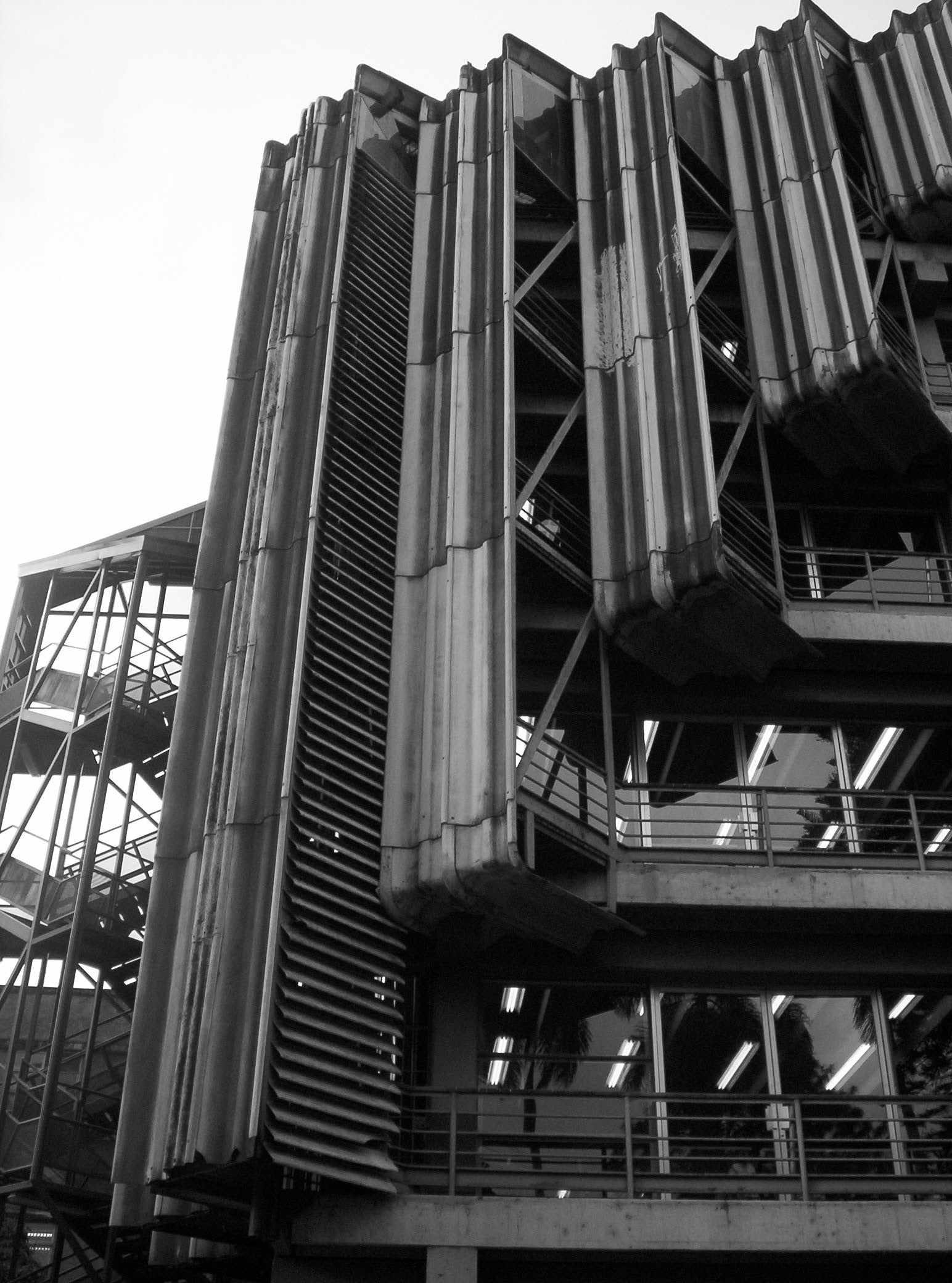
School of Architecture

Édgar Brenes is a Costa Rican architect and professor at the University of Costa Rica School of Architecture.
