= Sarchi, Kurdistan =

Sarchi سرچي
- Village
- Location within Iran
- Coordinates: 34°59′36″N 46°50′16″E
- Country: Iran
- Province: Kurdistan
- County: Kamyaran
- Bakhsh: Muchesh
- Rural District: Gavrud

Population (2006)
  - Total: 991
- Time zone: UTC+3:30 (IRST)
  - Summer (DST): UTC+4:30 (IRDT)

Sarchi (Persian: سرچي, also Romanized as Sarchī; also known as Sarchīn) is a village in Gavrud Rural District, Muchesh District, Kamyaran County, Kurdistan Province, Iran. At the 2006 census, its population was 991, in 237 families. The village is populated by Kurds.
