= Sarchí Sur =

District in Sarchí canton, Alajuela province, Costa Rica

- District
- Sarchí Sur district
- Sarchí Sur district location in Costa Rica
- Coordinates: 10.0745263°N 84.3442449°W
- Country: Costa Rica
- Province: Alajuela
- Canton: Sarchí

Area
  - Total: 6.36 km^{2} (2.46 sq mi)
- Elevation: 967 m (3,173 ft)

Population (2011)
  - Total: 5,143
  - Density: 809/km^{2} (2,090/sq mi)
- Time zone: UTC−06:00
- Postal code: 21202

Sarchí Sur is a district of the Sarchí canton, in the Alajuela province of Costa Rica.

== Geography ==
Sarchí Sur has an area of 6.36 km^{2} and an elevation of 967 metres.

== Demographics ==
Historical population
Census	Pop.	±% p.a.
1892	558	—
1927	1,234	+2.29%
1950	1,658	+1.29%
1963	2,443	+3.03%
1973	2,141	−1.31%
1984	2,743	+2.28%
2000	4,337	+2.90%
2011	5,143	+1.56%
2022	5,761	+1.04%
Source: Instituto Nacional de Estadística y Censos; Centro Centroamericano de Población

For the 2011 census, Sarchí Sur had a population of 5,143 inhabitants.

== Transportation ==
=== Road transportation ===
The district is covered by the following road routes:

- National Route 118
- National Route 708

== Places of Interest ==
- Plaza de la Artesanía: a large modern mall of souvenir shops where numerous buses carrying tourists from San José and elsewhere arrive throughout the day.
- Fabrica de carretas joaquin chaverri: a medium shop where you can find all kinds of souvenirs and painted oxcart.
