= Ibo Bonilla =

Costa Rican architect, sculptor, and mathematician

Ibo Bonilla Oconitrillo
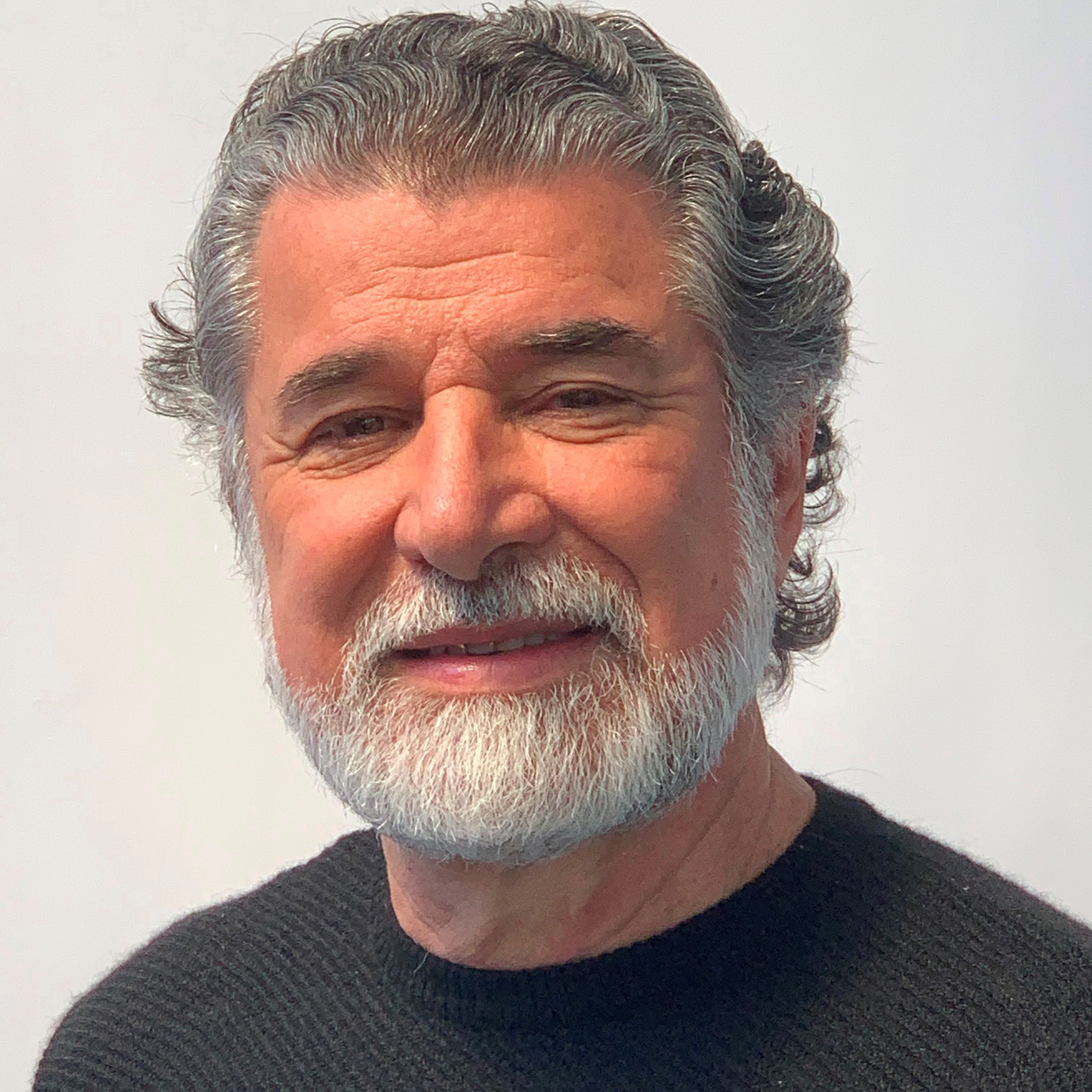
- Born: 23 January 1951 (age 75); Sarchí, Alajuela, Costa Rica
- Education: University of Costa Rica, Polytechnic University of Valencia, Escuela Europea de Negocios (Spain)
- Occupation: Architect
- Practice: IBO STUDIO

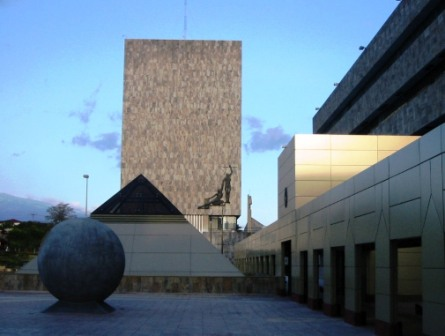
"Tradition, stability and justice"

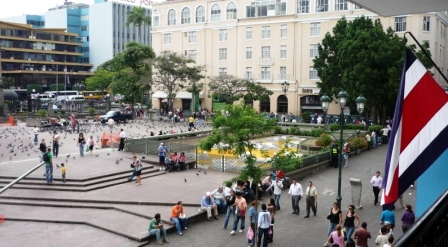
"Plaza de la Cultura"

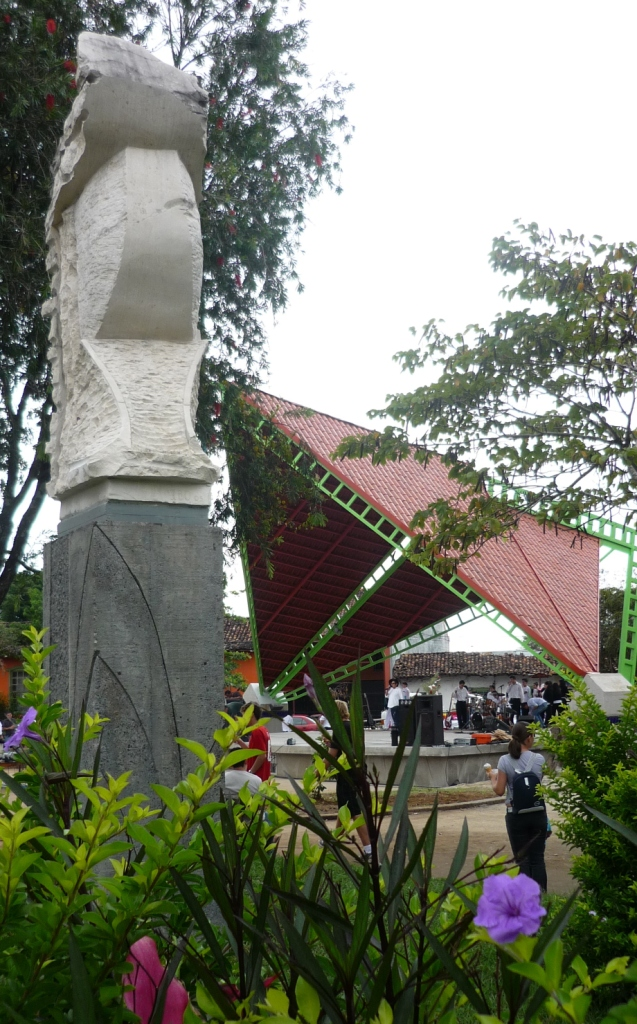
Barva Central Park, view of the Temple of Culture and the sculpture "Commuter"

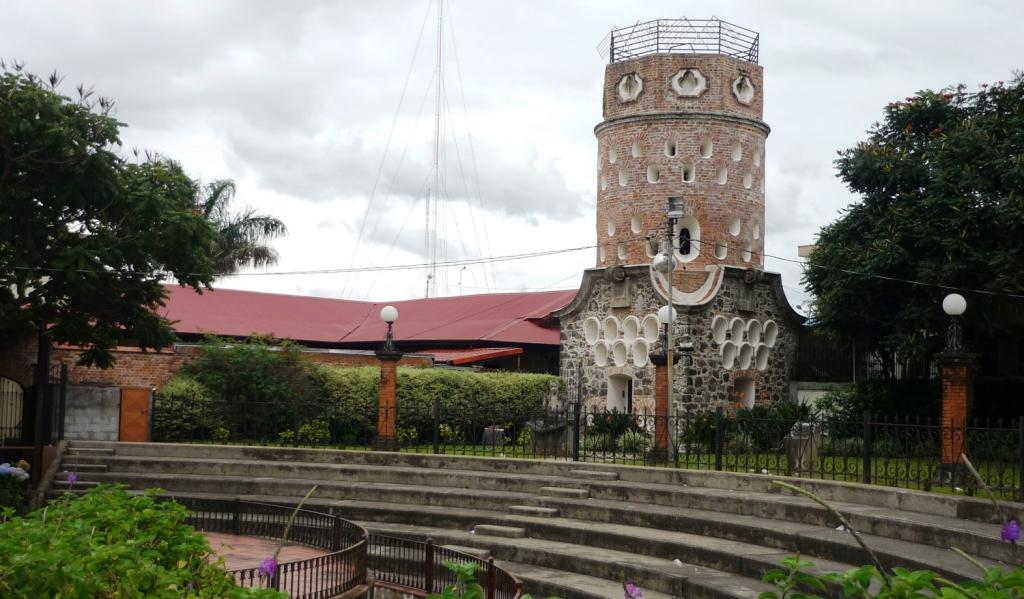
"El Fortín", simbol of Heredia, located in Heredia, Costa Rica

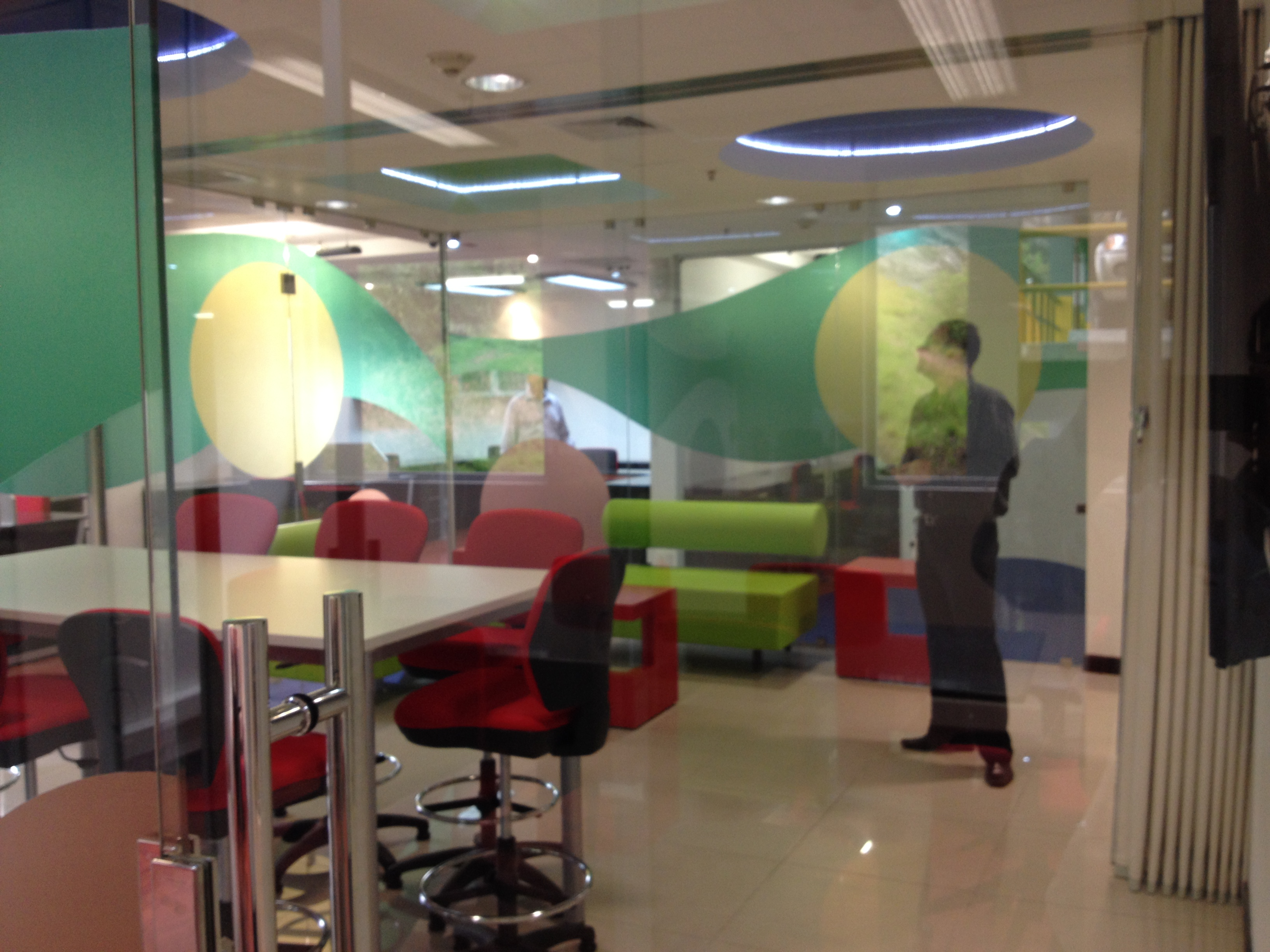
Application of principles of quantum architecture

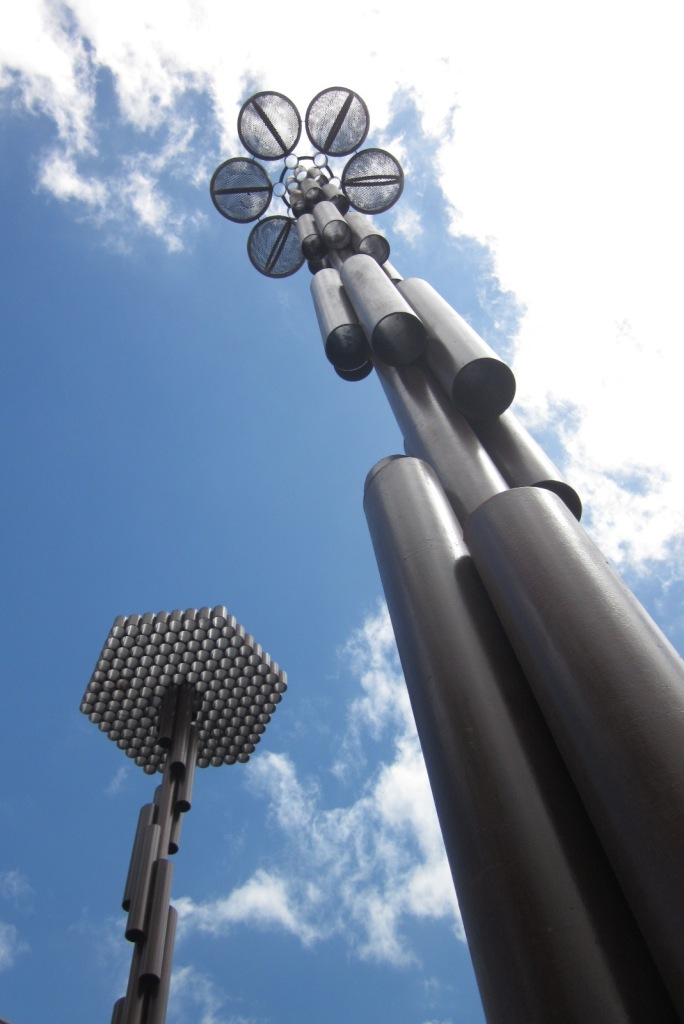
Sculpture "Espiral del Éxito" based on the flower of life and sacred geometry

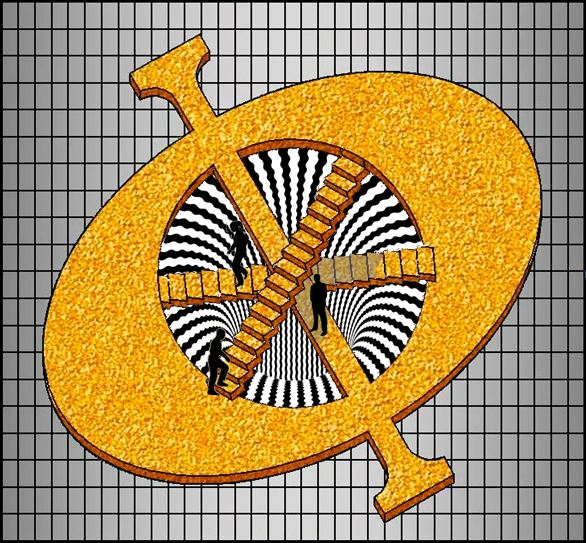
With the influence of Escher includes the impossible variable with Golden ratio, made for a park

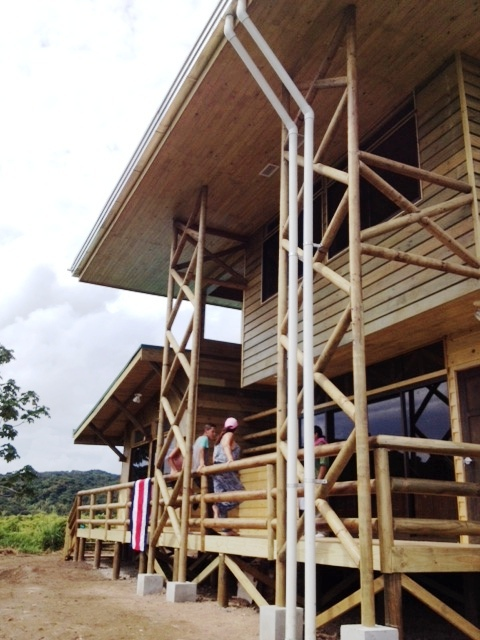
View of the Center of Control of Cocos Island, World Heritage Site

Ibo Bonilla Oconitrillo (born 23 January 1951) is an architect, sculptor, mathematician, and educator of Costa Rica. He has Costa Rican and Spanish nationality. He is known mainly for the creation of bioclimatic buildings and his monuments in public spaces.

== Biography ==
Ibo Bonilla, known as "Professor Ibo", was born in Sarchí, a town of Alajuela recognized as the cradle of art in Costa Rica. He has traveled the world, undertaken various jobs, and earned degrees in multiple fields: he is an architect, sculptor, mathematician, and educator from the University of Costa Rica; a technician in management and evaluation of quality from the Polytechnic University of Valencia, Spain; and holds a master's degree in business administration from the Escuela Europea de Negocios in Spain.

He also consults with engineering companies.

In 1977, he became the first architect to graduate from a degree program in Costa Rica. He was also the first Costa Rican architect incorporated as an architect in Spain.

Recognized in 2023 as one of "the ten most famous Costa Ricans in the world" and one of the three artists in that classification, and in 2020 as "the most influential architect in Costa Rica".

== Professional career ==
=== Architect ===
In the academic field, Ibo Bonilla's definition of architecture has become a benchmark: "Architecture is to sculpt the space in order to satisfy physical, emotional, and spiritual needs, protecting the results with a harmonic skin possessing aesthetic, techniques, and place, from the moment it is performed." "Architecture is to model social meta-skin with art." "…When the skin becomes preponderant due to its aesthetic value, it tends to be sculpture, if the predominance is technical, it tends to be construction engineering, if the emphasis is the location, it tends to be landscaping, if there is harmony amongst all the systems, we are in the presence of a very good architectural work. Each work has its proportion, and the right measure is the work of the architect, that if there is a dialogue and synthesis of poetic synergism, then we have a work of art."

His works are in the following sectors:

==== Public buildings ====
Latin American of Science and Technology University (ULACIT), Central American Roche Headquarters, Bank of Cathay of Costa Rica, Ocony's Companies, Radiotherapy Center of Irazú, Ibero American Hospital, Ibero American Geriatric Clinic, Sea and Sun Condominium, 352 Figurama Cosmetic Clinics, several clinics for the National Institute of Insurances, etc.

==== Houses ====
More than 2 million square meters in residences of all type, cost, location, singularity, and level.

==== Urban renovation ====
Central Bank of Costa Rica, International Bank of Costa Rica, Plaza de la Cultura, Pre-Columbian Gold Museum, the Square and Sculptural Garden of the Central Bank of Costa Rica, Walk of National Hero of the University Estatal a Distancia, Costa Rican Square of Justice, etc.

==== Bioclimatic architecture and landscape ====
Tropical Science Center, Tropical Experience Cultural Center, Latin American University of Science and Technology (ULACIT), Wilson Botanical Garden and Las Cruces Research Station, La Marta Wildlife Refuge, Jardín Botánico Las Cusingas Botanical Garden, Kèköldi Indigenous Reserve, Corcovado National Park, Manuel Antonio National Park, Braulio Carrillo National Park, Guayabo National Monument, Cocos Island National Park, etc.

==== Works with emphasis in ecological tourism, and rural tourism ====
Buenos Aires de Talamanca, Yorkin Indigenous Reserve, Kèköldi Indigenous Reserve, Carbon Dos Farm, El Silencio Dominical, La Marta farm in Turrialba, Tres Colinas de Potrero Grande, Zeta Trece (San Carlos), Bijagua de Upala, El Toro waterfalls (Sarchí), etc.

=== Sculptor ===
His sculpture works or pieces are located in public parks, museums, galleries, and private collections in different parts of the world. Their themes are tropical biodiversity, feelings, perception, and women. His works are made with different techniques and materials, including wood, stone, metals, clay, glass, quartz, lava, resins, ceramics, iron, and cement.

He has specialized in medium format (70 to 200 centimeters in height) for interiors and big format with monumental sculptures and sculptural walls.

He has participated in several collective and individual exhibitions, as well as in multiple workshops and seminars on painting and sculpture in Costa Rica and Spain.

Among his well-known works are:

- "El Obelisko Fi", a bronze statue that represents the National Prize of Architecture, granted every two years by the School of Architects of Costa Rica,
- "Cercanías", a 3.80 meter sculpture in the Sculpture Park of Barva, next to recognized works of sculptors from several countries,
- "Naturaleza Asediada", a lava sculpture articulated in two pieces, displayed in the Plaza de la Cultura Museum in San José, Costa Rica,
- "Amar y Brio", two Diorita rock sculptures, with a height of 2 meters, located in the entrance to Puebla Real Condominium in Heredia, Costa Rica.
- "Spiral of Success", a set of three steel sculptures located in Terra Campus, Tres Ríos. At 17.8m (58.4 feet), it is the highest in Costa Rica. While it is claimed to be inspired by the "Flower of Life" and related symbols (Seed of Life, Fruit of Life), the realized hexagonal patterns show no intersecting circles and therefore cannot be ascribed to those.

=== Teaching ===
From 1972, he has been a professor at the Universidad Autonoma de Central America, Universidad de Costa Rica, Universidad de las Ciencias y el Arte, Mons. Odio, School, San Agustín University, and others, in different subjects and careers:

- Mathematics at several levels
- Architecture Semiotics
- Architecture Field Theory
- Architectonic Design
- Communication Theory for Advertising Design Career

He is also a tutor, reader, and advisor for theses in various careers. He is recognized in the academic area for his efforts in forming professionals concerned with solidarity and social responsibility.

=== Conferencing ===
Gives speeches on bioclimatic architecture, geotecture, sustainable construction, green building, cultural heritage, art, architecture, and pedagogy in different congresses, symposiums, universities, and forums, with emphasis on socially responsible coexistence and biodiversity protection.

=== Business administrator ===
He specializes in the social and solidarity function of the work, with programming emphasis, goal definition, and human resources valuation, within the frame of a "culture of solid and shared company". He has written articles on "symbiosis and commensalism in the trade", "love and hatred for a product in study", "the proxemic and efficiency in the offices", educative administration, etc. He also collaborates with indigenous associations and farmers to improve their standard of living, such as alternatives to forest operations and emigration to the city.

== Literature ==
- Troyo, Elena, ed. (1998). Historia de la Arquitectura en Costa Rica. Fundación Museos Banco Central, San José. ISBN 9968-9795-4-6.
- Low, Setha, ed. (2000). On the Plaza: The Politics of Public Space and Culture. University of Texas, Texas. ISBN 978-0-292-74714-2.

=== Specialized magazines ===
- Salazar, Abel (2007). "Premio Nacional de Arquitectura". Habitar, Revista de Arquitectura y Diseño. OCLC 40232820.
- Salazar, Abel (2008). "Entre amigos ...una entrevista colectiva". Habitar, Revista de Arquitectura y Diseño. OCLC 40232820.
