= Atenas (canton) =

Canton in Alajuela province, Costa Rica

- Canton
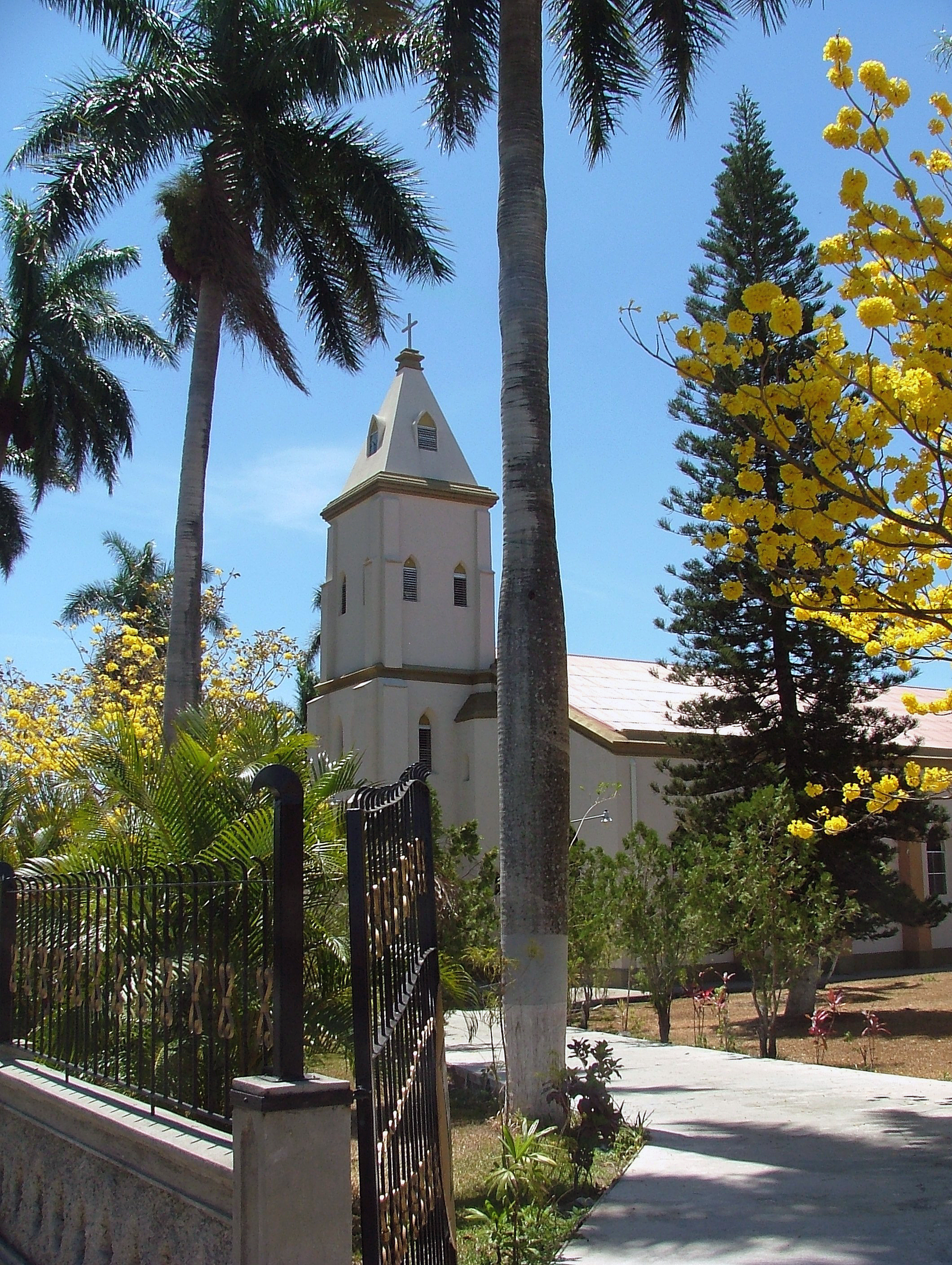
- Church in Atenas

- Flag Seal
- Interactive map of Atenas
- Atenas canton location in Alajuela Province Atenas canton location in Costa Rica
- Coordinates: 9.9794864°N 84.4049451°W
- Country: Costa Rica
- Province: Alajuela
- Creation: 7 August 1868
- Head city: Atenas
- Districts: Districts: Atenas; Jesús; Mercedes; San Isidro; Concepción; San José; Santa Eulalia; Escobal

Government
  - Type: Municipality
  - Body: Municipalidad de Atenas

Area
  - Total: 127.19 km^{2} (49.11 sq mi)
- Elevation: 706 m (2,316 ft)

Population (2011)
  - Total: 25,460
  - Density: 200.2/km^{2} (518.4/sq mi)
- Time zone: UTC−06:00
- Canton code: 205
- Website: www.atenasmuni.go.cr

Atenas is a canton in the Alajuela province of Costa Rica.

== Toponymy ==
It is named for the ancient city of Athens in Greece as rendered in Spanish.

== History ==
Atenas was created on 7 August 1868 by decree 30.

== Geography ==
Atenas has an area of 127.19 km^{2} and a mean elevation of 706 metres.

It is a fairly compact canton, mountainous for the most part. The Grande River forms the border on the canton's north and east sides. As the river moves south, it is joined by two other large rivers, the Poás River and the Virilla River, before turning west again and forming the canton's southern border under a new name, the Grande de Tárcoles River. The western border of the canton is established by a series of creeks and their canyons that cut through the Coastal Mountain Range.

== Districts ==
The canton of Atenas is subdivided into the following districts:

1. Atenas
2. Jesús
3. Mercedes
4. San Isidro
5. Concepción
6. San José
7. Santa Eulalia
8. Escobal

== Demographics ==
Historical population
Census	Pop.	±% p.a.
1864	3,185	—
1883	5,551	+2.97%
1892	6,208	+1.25%
1927	7,631	+0.59%
1950	9,313	+0.87%
1963	11,018	+1.30%
1973	12,610	+1.36%
1984	15,011	+1.60%
2000	22,479	+2.56%
2011	25,460	+1.14%
2022	25,460	+0.00%
Source: Instituto Nacional de Estadística y Censos; Centro Centroamericano de Población

For the 2011 census, Atenas had a population of 25,460 inhabitants.

== Transportation ==
=== Road transportation ===
The canton is covered by the following road routes:

- National Route 3
- National Route 27
- National Route 134
- National Route 135
- National Route 707
- National Route 713
- National Route 716
- National Route 720
