= Alajuela Province =

Province of Costa Rica

Province of Alajuela Provincia de Alajuela
- Province
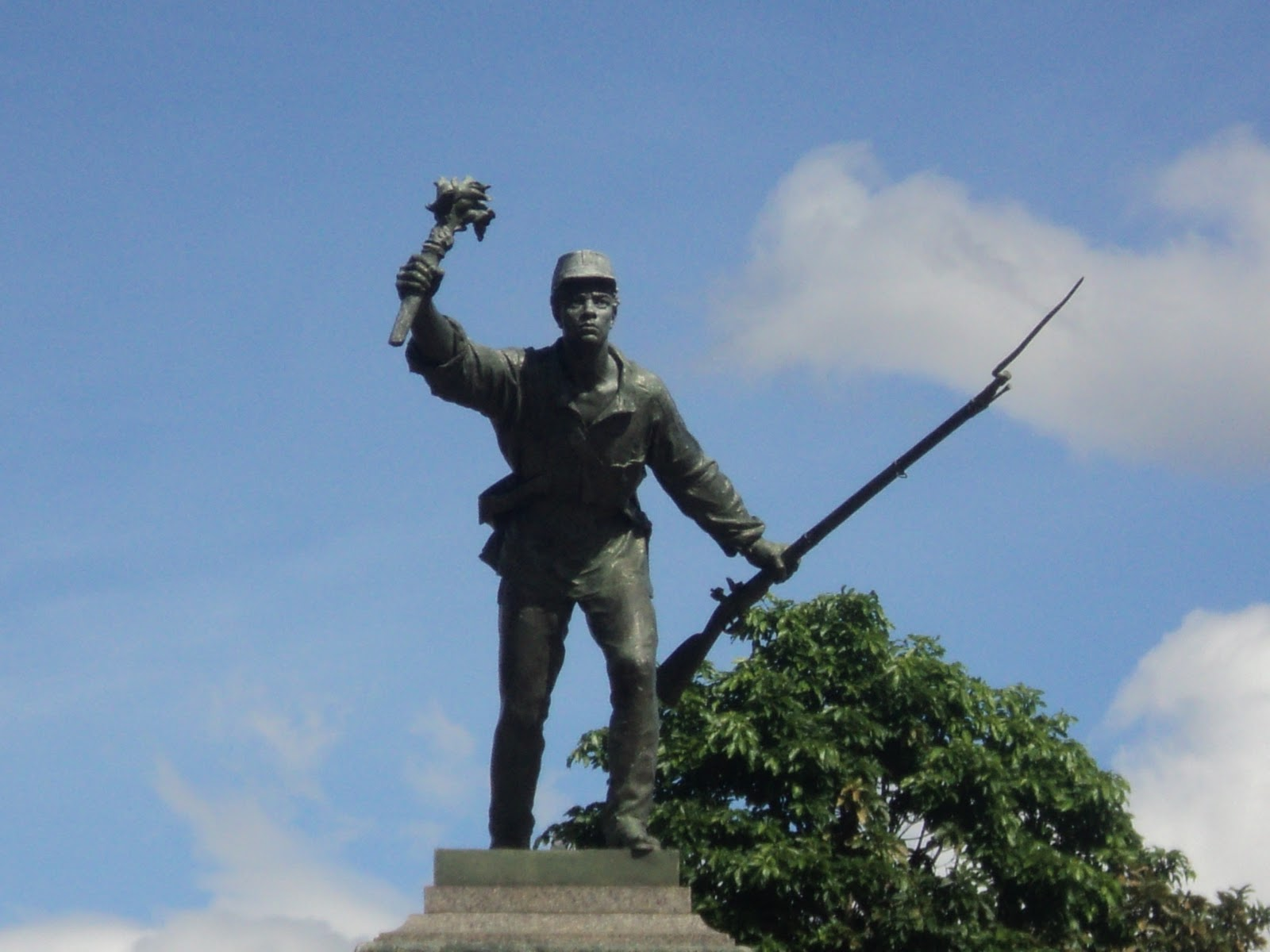
- Juan Santamaría statue, built in 1887

- Flag Coat of arms

- Location of the Province of Alajuela
- Coordinates: 10.465°N 84.460°W
- Country: Costa Rica
- Provincial capital: Alajuela

Area
  - Total: 9,757.53 km^{2} (3,767.40 sq mi)

Population
  - Total: 1,055,637
  - Density: 108.187/km^{2} (280.203/sq mi)
- Demonyms: Alajuelense, Alajuelan
- ISO 3166 code: CR-A
- HDI (2022): 0.800 very high · 4th of 7

Alajuela (Spanish pronunciation: [alaˈxwela]) is a province of Costa Rica. It is located in the north-central part of the country, bordering Nicaragua to the north. It also borders the provinces of Heredia to the east, San José to the south, Puntarenas to the southwest, and Guanacaste to the west. As of 2011, the province had a population of 885,571. Alajuela is composed of 16 cantons, which are divided into 111 districts. It covers an area of 9,757.53 square kilometers.

The provincial capital is Alajuela. Other large cities include Quesada, Aguas Zarcas, Naranjo, Zarcero, Orotina, Sarchí Norte, Upala, San Ramón, Grecia and Los Chiles.

== Provincial history ==
=== Pre-Columbia and the arrival of the Spanish ===
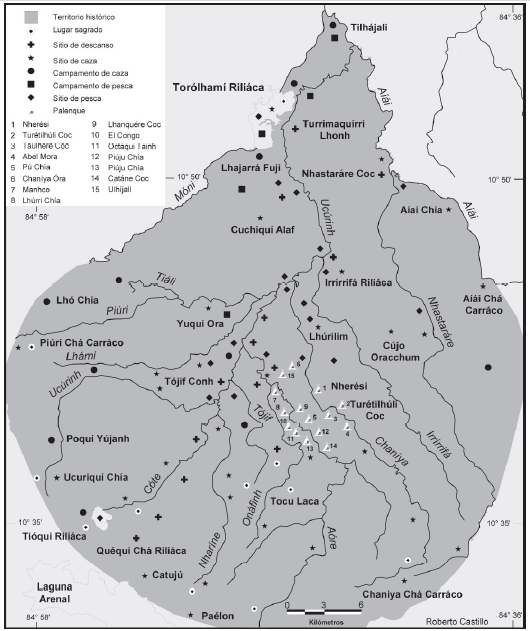
Traditional indigenous territory of Guatusos

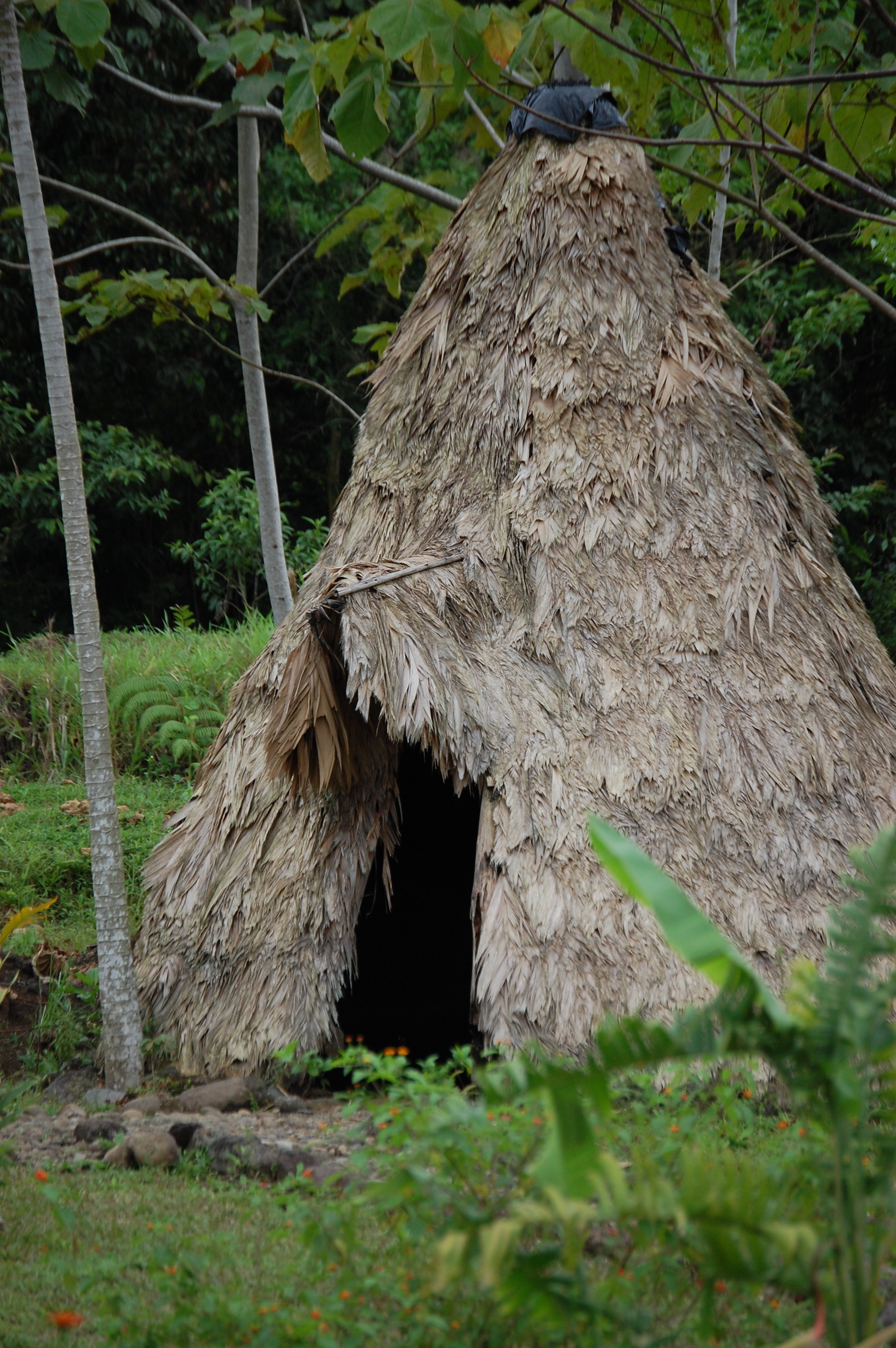
Indigenous hut

Costa Rica has been inhabited for nearly 10,000 years, but little is known of its pre-Columbian history. Alajuela was occupied by several indigenous groups just before the arrival of the Spanish. Despite being between two major civilizations, indigenous groups sparsely populated the area. The Hueteres lived in the south of the territory, while the Botos, Guatusos, Tices and Catapas lived in the north. In the 15th century, most of the region of modern Alajuela was under the control of Garabito, an indigenous leader of whom little is known. Only the Botos, who lived in Alajuela's northern plains, resisted conquest until the early 1800s.

Starting in the 16th century, Spanish conquistadors arrived in the Central Valley from Guanacaste. The natives who survived epidemics and conquest were placed in the encomienda system of labor, which exploited natives and funneled money to the Spanish Crown. In 1574, the first reservation for natives was created at Santa Catalina, the Canton of Mateo.

=== Founding Alajuela ===
Because landholdings in Cartago, the colonial capital of the region, were already controlled by large encomiendas, many settlers began moving west in the mid-1600s. In 1657, Alajuela was mentioned for the first time in the writings of Juana de Vera y Sotomayor, a traveler who described an encomienda "on La Lajuela river". Before taking on the name of Alajuela, the area was known as Villahermosa.

Esteban Lorenzo de Tristán, Bishop of Nicaragua, Nicoya, and Costa Rica, tried organizing Catholic communities west of Heredia. In doing so, he inaugurated a small oratory to unite the scattered settlers. The oratory was centered in the village of "La Lajuela", between the Ciruelas and Alajuela rivers. Because of its creation, the city of Alajuela was officially founded on 12 October 1782. In 1790, the first official parish of Alajuela was established, led by the priest Manuel López del Corral. The creation of a parish brought more settlers to the region. Soon, they began moving further and further toward the edges of the Central Valley, founding Atenas in 1836, San Ramón in 1854, and Grecia in 1856. Soon, the cities of Naranjo, Zarcero, and Quesada were founded as well.

=== National independence ===
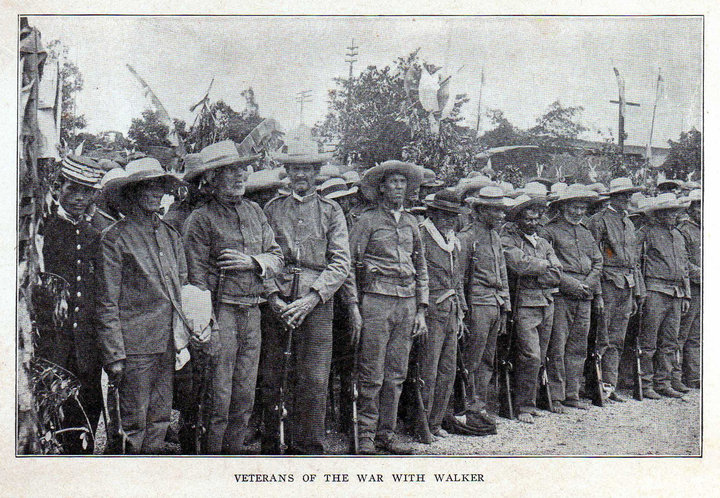
Costa Rican veterans of the 1856 campaign, taken in 1895

In 1823, during the First Costa Rican Civil War, Costa Rica was divided into two groups: the Imperialists, loyal to the First Mexican Empire, and the Republicans, who sought independence. For the most part, Alajuela and San José fought against the coup staged by the Republicans in Heredia and Cartago. The Alajuelan side won. Costa Rica left the Mexican Empire shortly before it dissolved. While Costa Rica was a member of the Federal Republic of Central America in the 1830s, the city of Alajuela was the nation's capital.

In 1831, Alajuelan folk hero Juan Santamaría was born. Santamaría was a peasant boy who volunteered as a drummer during the Campaign of 1856–1857. On 11 April 1856, Santamaría sacrificed himself to burn filibuster William Walker's stronghold at Santa Rosa, asking only that his mother be taken care of.

Settlement of the northern portion of Alajuela began in earnest only in the latter half of the 19th century. It did not reach grand proportions until the second half of the 20th century, owing mainly to difficult access. Much of the original colonization came from Nicaragua since numerous navigable rivers flow north from their origins in the cordilleras and empty into either Lake Nicaragua or the San Juan River. By 1850, the province had a population of approximately 15,540.

=== 20th century ===
On 16 February 1921, Pope Benedict XV issued a papal bull that reorganized Alajuela into an Ecclesiastic Province run by the incumbents of two new positions: the Archbishop of Alajuela and the Apostolic Vicar of Limón.

A seminal event in Alajuela's history was the 1968 eruption of Volcán Arenal. Residents previously referred to it as Mount Arenal. In the years before the eruption, residents reported rising groundwater temperatures and slight tremors. Beginning on 28 July 1969, residents of surrounding towns reported constant tremors. The eruptions began on 29 July, spewing ash into the neighboring provinces and launching boulders into the sky. The initial explosions were so strong that three craters were instantaneously created. The cities of Tabacón, Pueblo Nuevo, and San Luís were buried, killing 87 people. Crops were destroyed, and livestock killed.

In 1979, Lake Arenal was created as the result of the construction of a hydroelectric dam by the Instituto Costarricense de Electricidad, Costa Rica's national electric company. The old cities of Tabacón and Tronadora were submerged, and residents moved to the new town of Tabacón at its current location, although the church's steeple can still be seen. The dam produces 17% of the country's electricity.

== Geography ==
The province is located in the North Central Plains and borders Nicaragua (Departamento de Rivas, Departamento del Río San Juan) to the north and the Costa Rican provinces of Heredia to the east, San José to the south, and Guanacaste to the west. Alajuela's San Carlos (canton) is larger than the provinces of Heredia and Cartago. It is the largest canton in Costa Rica, occupying 34.32% of the provincial territory and 6.55% of the national territory.

=== Mountains ===
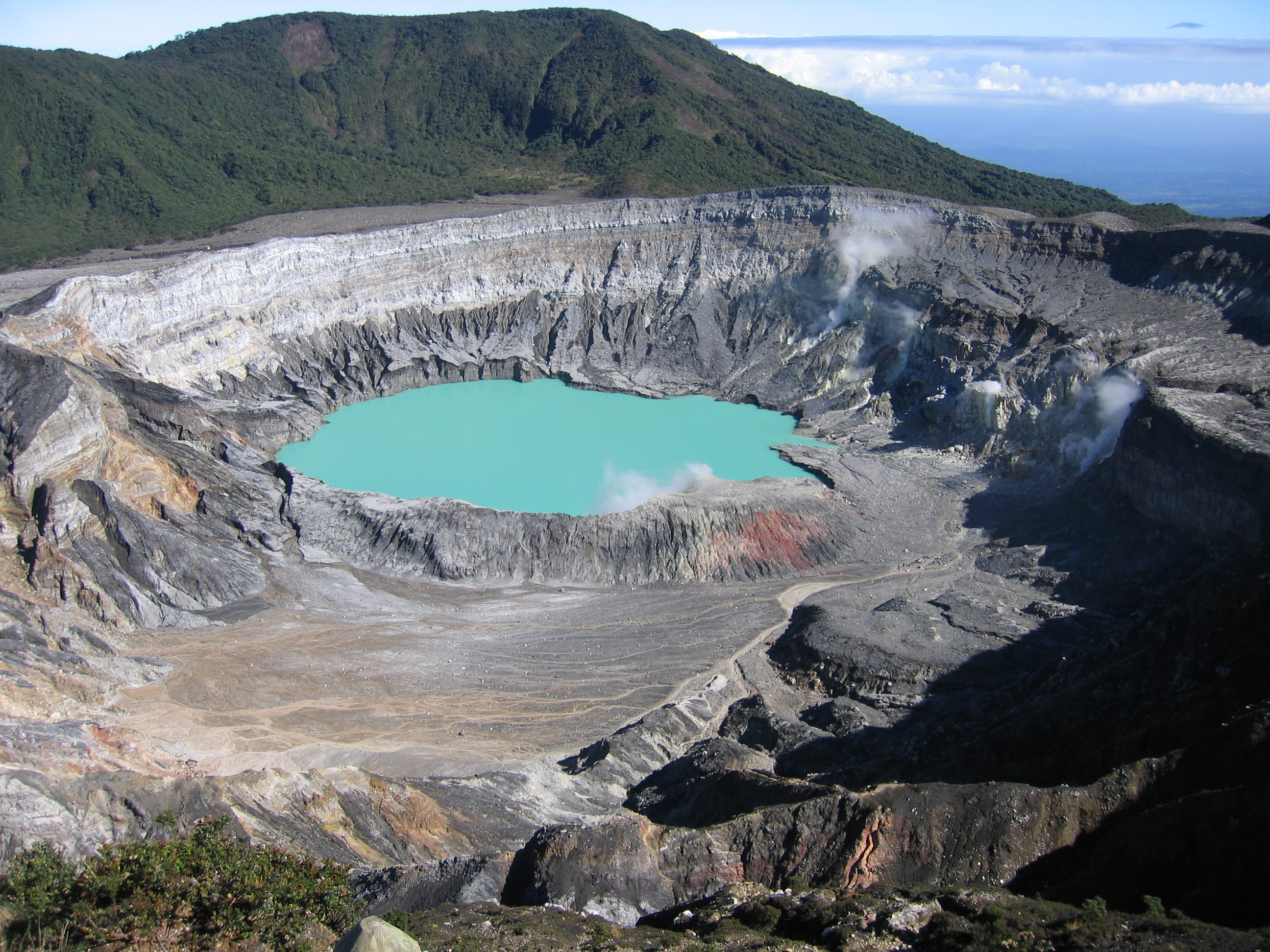
Poás Volcano Crater, Poás Volcano National Park with acidic lake

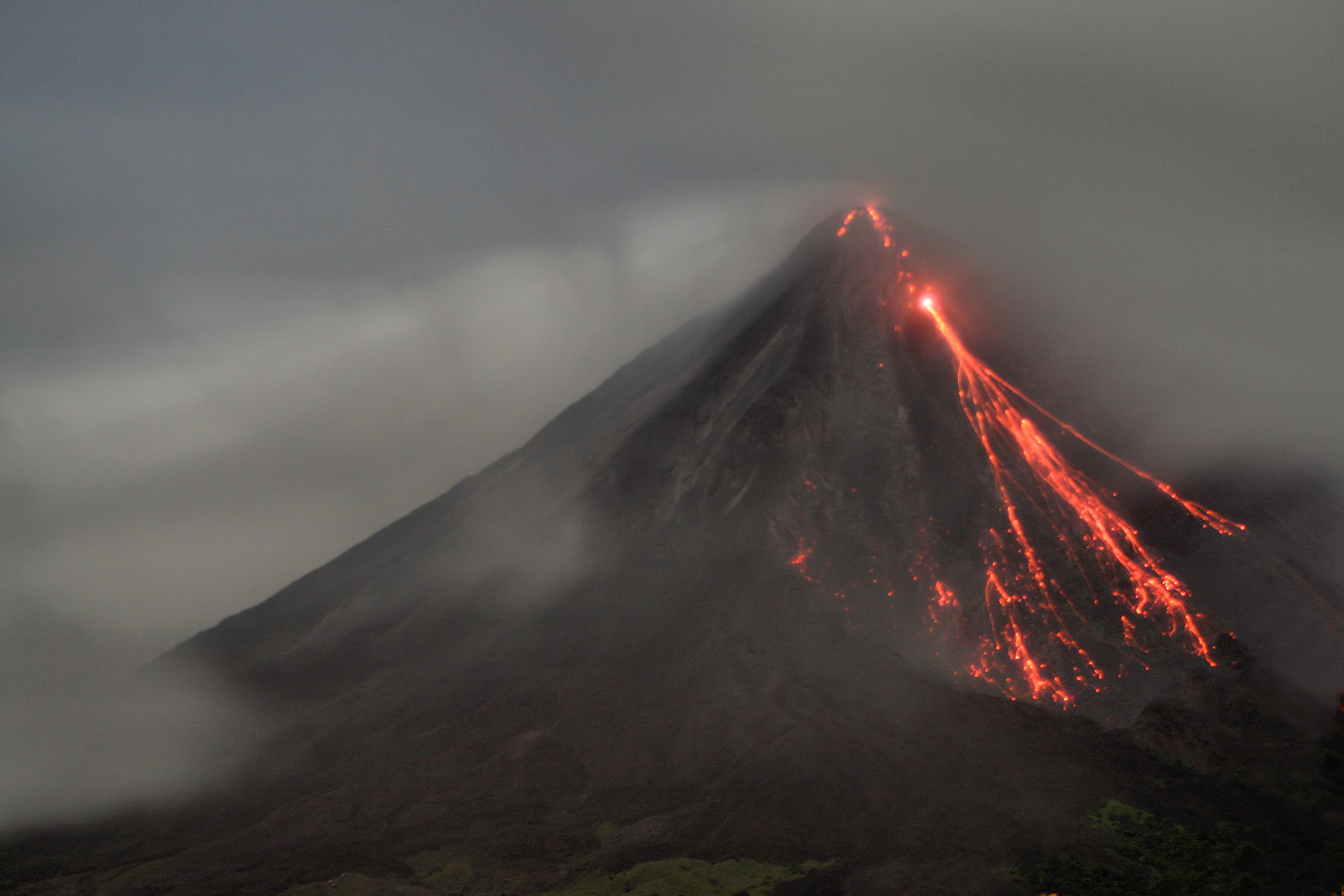
Arenal Volcano in La Fortuna of San Carlos remains active, and volcanic eruptions can be seen.

The Central Mountain Range (Cordillera Central de Costa Rica) passes through the province's borders, as do the Tilarán and Guanacaste ranges. This province is also home to the two most active Costa Rican Volcanoes: Poás Volcano and the Arenal Volcano.

Mountain Peaks of Alajuela Province
Name	Height (feet)	Height (meters)	Notes
Poás Volcano	8,871	2,704	active stratovolcano with one of the most acidic lakes in the world
Cerro Barquero	6,944	2,117	
Cerro Camacho	6,672	2,034	
Cerro Platanar	6,572	2,003	unmonitored, active stratovolcano
Cerro La Barranca	5,882	1,696	
Volcán Arenal	5,479	1,670	active stratovolcano, deadly 1968 eruption began an active period
Cerro Porvenir	4,734	1,443	active stratovolcano
Cerro Espíritu Santo	3,983	1,214	home of abandoned church and school near the peak
Cerro Chato	3,740	1,140	inactive volcano on the southeast side of Arenal, location of Crater Lake
Cerro Nispero	1,110	338	

=== Rivers ===
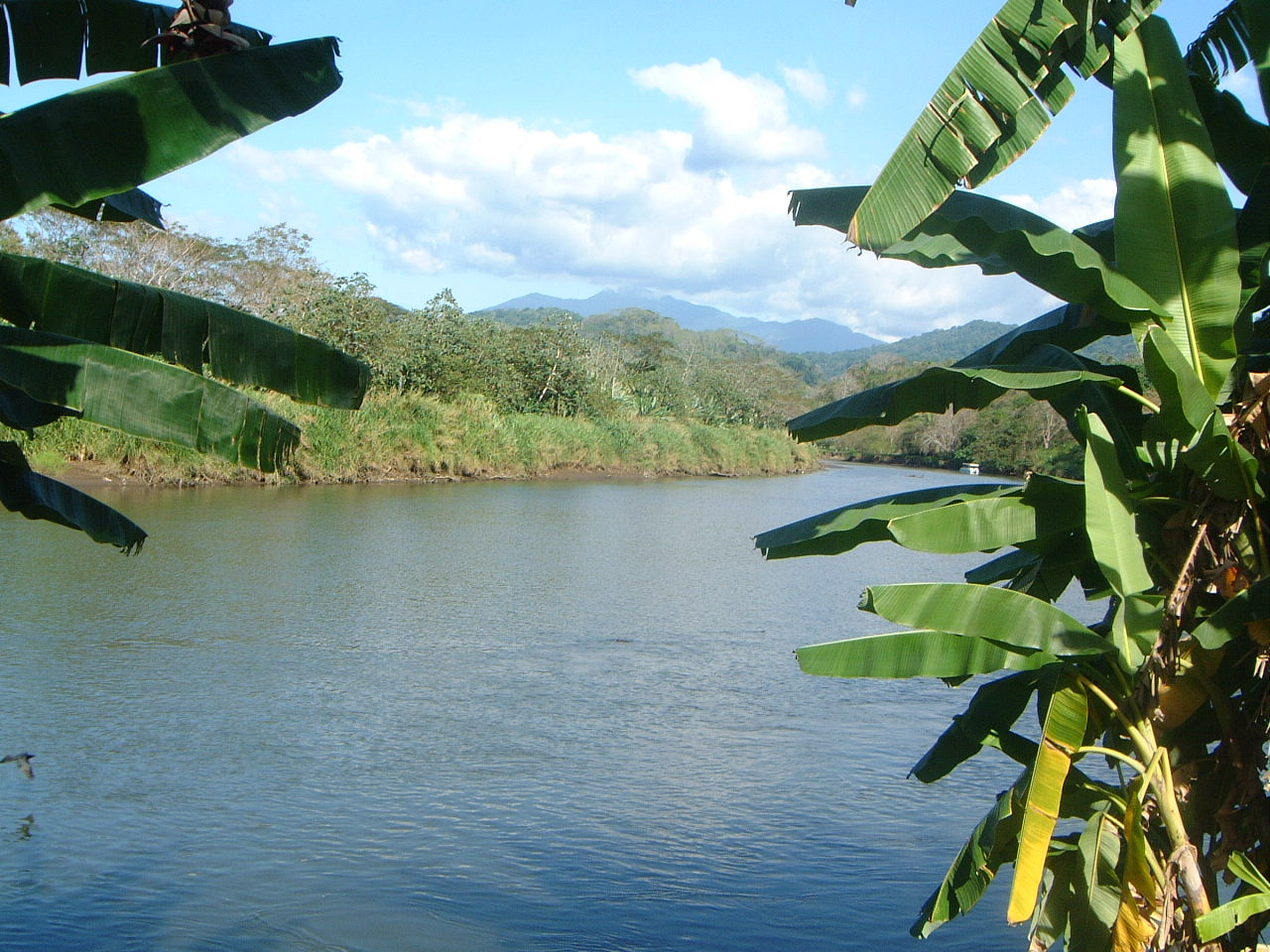
Río Grande de Tárcoles

In the northern plains, the San Carlos and Frío rivers flow into the San Juan River basin, which separates Nicaragua and Costa Rica. The Tárcoles River, which flows to the Gulf of Nicoya, is known for its crocodile population.

Major Rivers in Alajuela Province
Name	Notes
Río Grande de Tárcoles	111 kilometers long, the most polluted river in Costa Rica
Río Frío	flows north to Lake Nicaragua
Río San Juan	part of the border between Costa Rica and Nicaragua, tributaries include Río Poco Sol, Río Carlos River
Río San Carlos	142 km long, a major tributary of the Rio San Juan
Río Segundo	flows through the municipality of Alajuela
Río Burío	runs through La Fortuna, tributaries include Quebrada Cristalina
Río San Martin	runs south through Ciudad Quesada
Peñas Blancas	flows southwest in the Central Valley, tributaries include Río Burro
Río San Pedro	flows north, tributaries include Río Zapote, Río La Vieja, Río Peaje
Virilla	flows west, site of El Virilla train accident
Río Poas	flows south
Aguas Zarcas	
Tres Amigos	
San Lorenzo	
Arenal	
Jesús María	
Río Cuarto	

=== Waterfalls ===
- Cataratas del Toro
- La Paz
- La Fortuna
- Los Chorros

== Environment ==
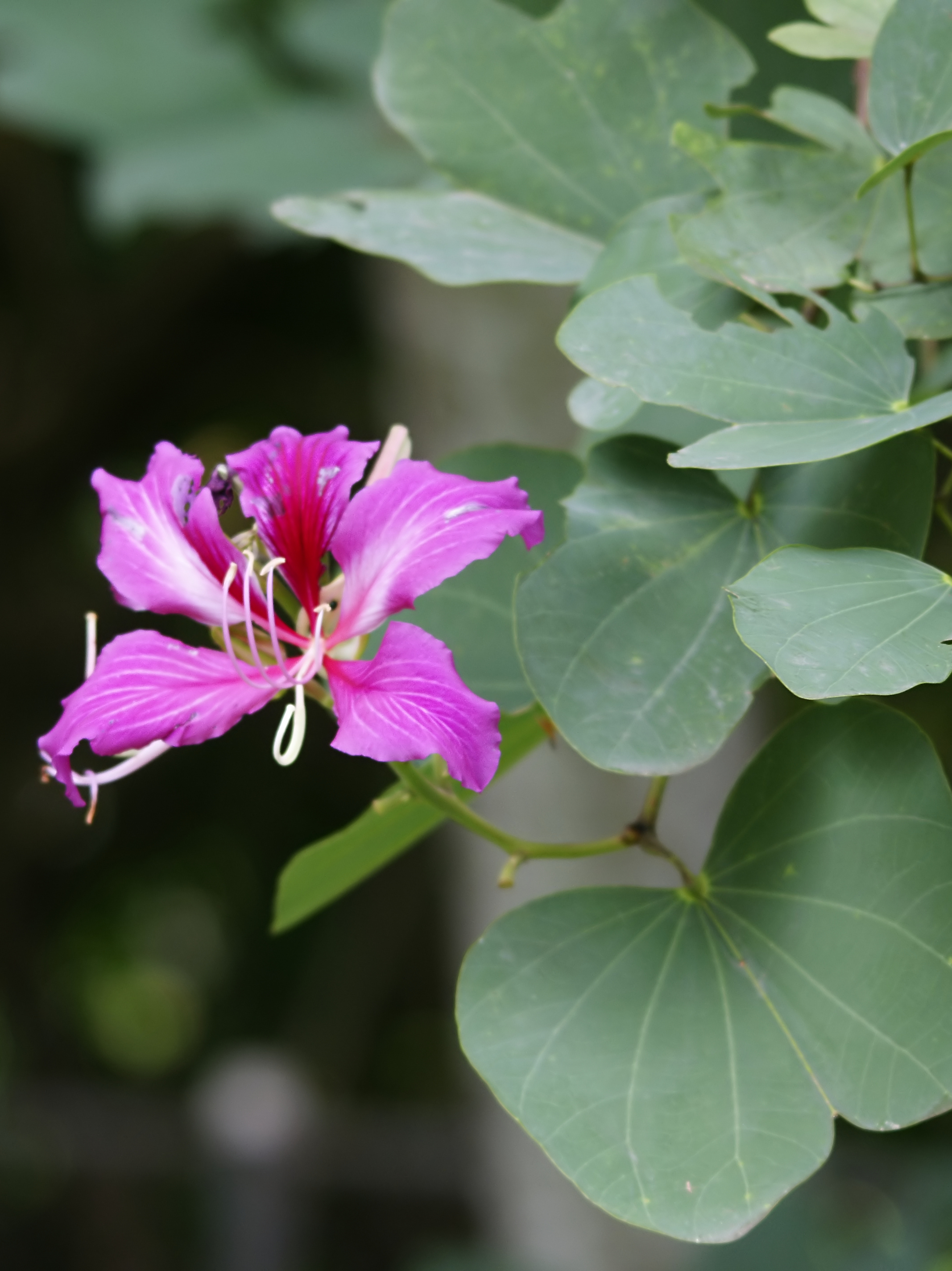
Bauhinia blakeana

Although several ecosystems exist in the province, the Llanuras del Norte (Northern Plains) and the Central Valley highlands are two distinct divisions. The Llanuras del Norte stretch across several provinces, while the Central Valley highlands encompass the middle region of the country. Alajuela's natural environment is one of the primary reasons tourists visit the country.

=== Flora and fauna ===
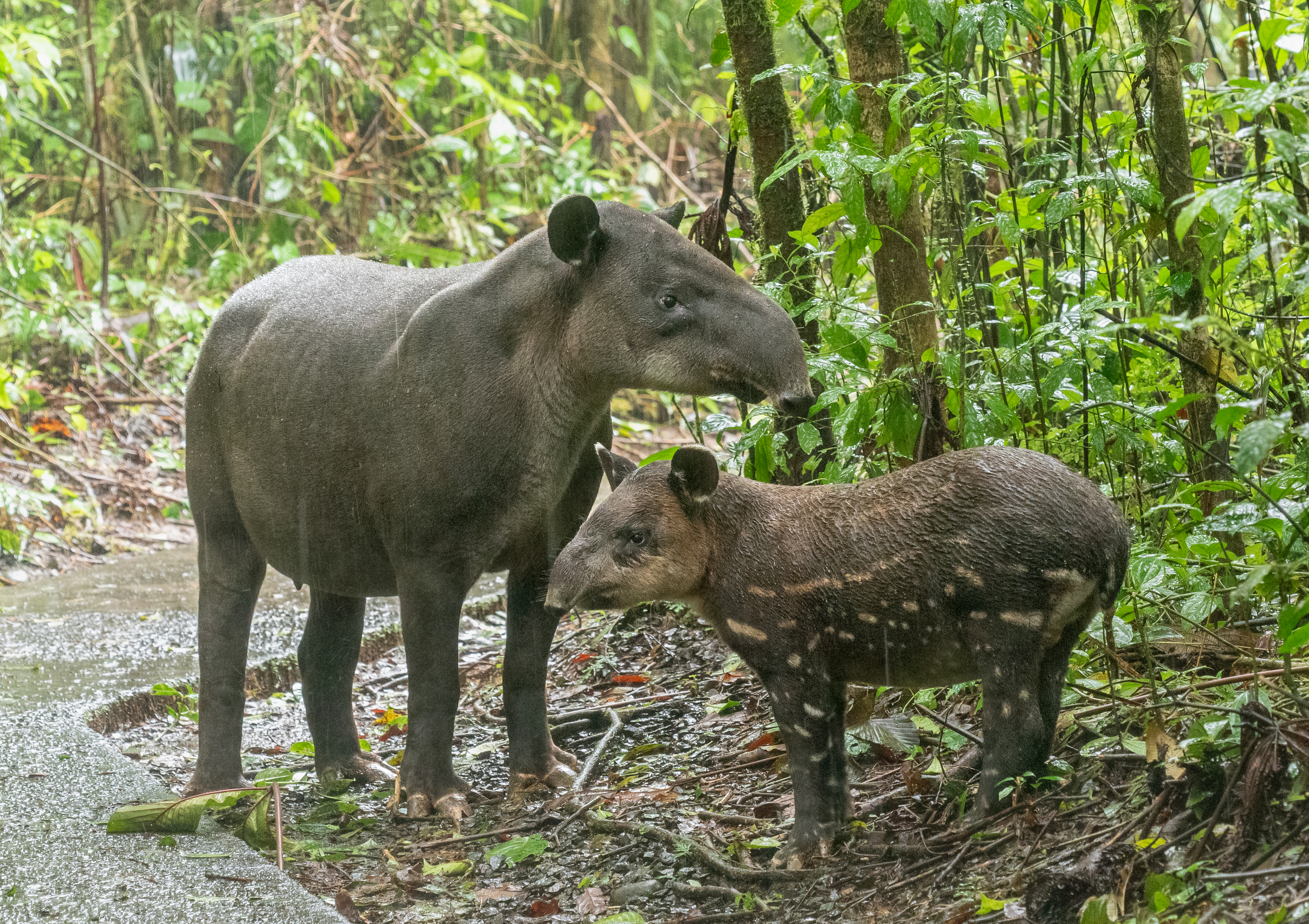
Mother and juvenile Baird's tapir near Rio Celeste

Costa Rica is a biodiversity hotspot, and Alajuela is no exception. Thousands of species are native to the province.

Nearly a third of the country's 1,400 types of orchids can be found in the Monteverde Cloud Forest Reserve, which straddles the border between Alajuela and Guanacaste.

Birds such as the quetzal, scarlet macaw, hummingbird, woodpecker, kingfisher, toucan, and three-wattled bellbird are native to Alajuela. There are many species of bats as well, like the spectral bat, Honduran white bat, and the thumbless bat. Many insect species, including butterflies and moths, are native to Alajuela. Because of this, the Butterfly Farm in La Garita was established to further scientific research into the different species.

The white-headed capuchin is native to the forests of the province, as is the mantled howler. Other mammals native to Alajuela include Baird's tapir, the giant anteater, the silky anteater, margays, ocelots, and other wild cats. Jaguars, while rarely seen, also inhabit the province's national parks. Deer are native to the highlands and the Northern Plains.

Machaca and bass are two fish found throughout the province. In addition, there are many other species of invertebrates and amphibians.

=== Climate ===
Temperature extremes in Alajuela range from 36.6 Fahrenheit (2.6 Celsius) to 95.6 Fahrenheit (35.2 Celsius). The year is generally split into two seasons: the dry season, or summer, from December to April, and the rainy season, or winter, from May to November. The winter corresponds with the Atlantic hurricane season, so rain can be a daily part of Alajuelan life. The highlands and the Northern Plains can vary significantly in temperature and precipitation.

Climate data for Los Chiles, Alajuela
Month	Jan	Feb	Mar	Apr	May	Jun	Jul	Aug	Sep	Oct	Nov	Dec	Year
Mean daily maximum °F (°C)	85.5 (29.7)	87.6 (30.9)	90.9 (32.7)	92.8 (33.8)	91 (33)	88.9 (31.6)	87.6 (30.9)	88.7 (31.5)	90.1 (32.3)	89.2 (31.8)	86.9 (30.5)	85.6 (29.8)	88.7 (31.5)
Daily mean °F (°C)	77.5 (25.3)	78.3 (25.7)	79.9 (26.6)	81.7 (27.6)	82 (28)	81.3 (27.4)	80.4 (26.9)	81.1 (27.3)	81.7 (27.6)	81.3 (27.4)	79.5 (26.4)	78.1 (25.6)	80.2 (26.8)
Mean daily minimum °F (°C)	69.3 (20.7)	68.9 (20.5)	68.7 (20.4)	70.3 (21.3)	72.9 (22.7)	73.6 (23.1)	73.2 (22.9)	73.4 (23.0)	73 (23)	73.2 (22.9)	70.1 (21.2)	70.5 (21.4)	71.4 (21.9)

Climate data for Municipality of Alajuela, Alajuela (Central Valley)
Month	Jan	Feb	Mar	Apr	May	Jun	Jul	Aug	Sep	Oct	Nov	Dec	Year
Mean daily maximum °F (°C)	82.8 (28.2)	84 (29)	85.8 (29.9)	86.4 (30.2)	83.8 (28.8)	82.8 (28.2)	82.8 (28.2)	82.8 (28.2)	82 (28)	80.8 (27.1)	81.1 (27.3)	81.9 (27.7)	83.1 (28.4)
Daily mean °F (°C)	71 (22)	71 (22)	73 (23)	73 (23)	71 (22)	69 (21)	71 (22)	69 (21)	69 (21)	69 (21)	69 (21)	69 (21)	69 (21)
Mean daily minimum °F (°C)	65.3 (18.5)	65.5 (18.6)	65.5 (18.6)	66.4 (19.1)	66.4 (19.1)	66 (19)	66 (19)	65.7 (18.7)	64.8 (18.2)	65.1 (18.4)	65.1 (18.4)	65.1 (18.4)	65.7 (18.7)

== Economy ==
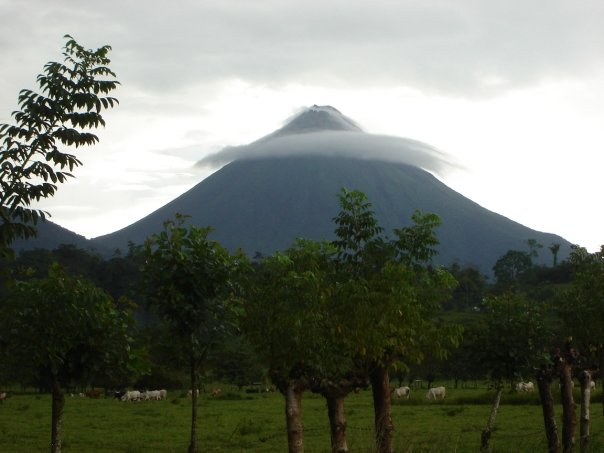
Cattle ranching under the Arenal Volcano

=== Agriculture ===
The base of Alajuela's economy remains agricultural production. In the southern highlands of the province, tropical ornamentals, coffee, tubers, and green vegetables are the major crops. Rice, corn, pineapple, bananas, and sugarcane are important crops in the north and northeast. Alajuela ranks first nationwide in national coffee production and national sugar cane production. Many of the agricultural products are exported overseas.

This region has extensive pastoral areas, especially in the San Carlos area, where a significant cattle ranching sector is located. The cattle industry has spawned the production of leather, milk, dairy products, and beef. The municipality of Upala serves as a supply center for cattle ranchers north of the province. Naranjo, so named because "Naranjo" means orange in Spanish, produces oranges largely for domestic consumption. For a short time in the 1800s, tobacco was a cash crop in the Palmares region, though production has since declined. There is growing small-scale organic farming industry in Alajuela.

=== Industry and commerce ===
In recent years, Alajuela has attracted many export-oriented manufacturing companies, especially within the free trade zones around the municipality of Alajuela. Free trade zones include Coyol, Saret, Montecillos, and Bes, among others. Alajuela's free trade zones are primarily industrial. The increase in manufacturing, which began in earnest in 2004, has strained the province's infrastructure, including water distribution, transportation capacity, and electrical output. When a hydroelectric plant was constructed in Grecia in 2012, construction upstarts doubled within two months. Industry-related construction accounted for the largest growth. Major companies in these zones include medical equipment manufacturers like Allergan, Baxter, Hospira, and Boston Scientific.

Costa Rican lactate conglomerate Dos Pinos is headquartered in Alajuela. Cooperativa de Productores de Leche Dos Pinos exports products throughout Latin America and began exporting to China in 2013. Bebidas Florida, a drink manufacturer with a license to bottle Coca-Cola products, is also headquartered in Alajuela. Other businesses in the province include a butterfly egg and larvae exporter.

Several major banks are headquartered in the Alajuela province, including Grupo Mutual Alajuela and the Costa Rican branches of Scotiabank, HSBC, Banco Cathay, and Citibank. Grupo Mutual Alajuela maintains a secure banking center in the province. There is a large, modern mall in Alajuela close to the Juan Santamaría International Airport where many international brands maintain branches. A Honduran construction firm is constructing another mall.

=== Tourism ===
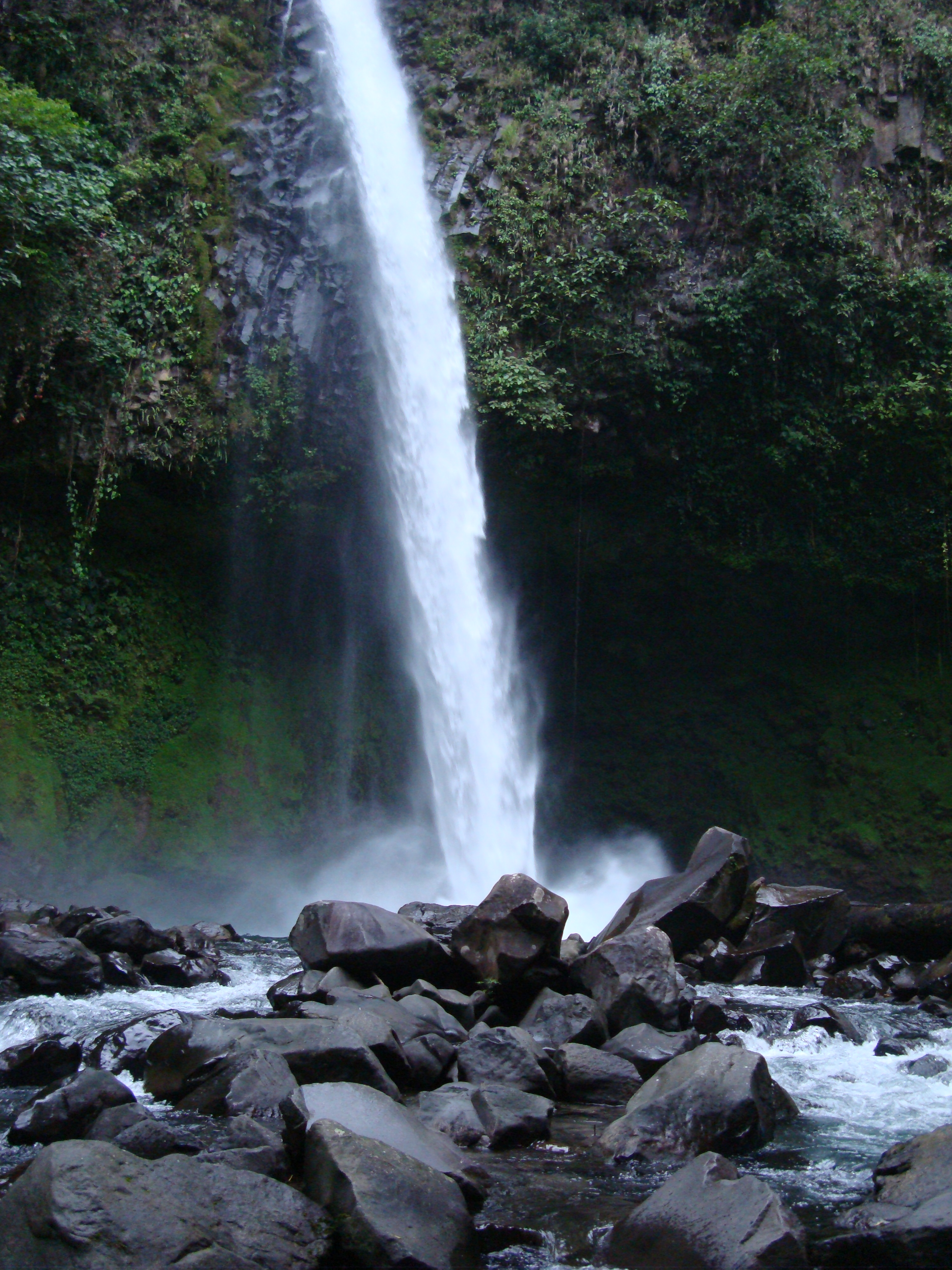
La Fortuna Waterfall

Alajuela has a well-developed tourist sector throughout the province. Tourism is promoted by the Instituto Costarricense de Turismo (ICT) (Costa Rican Tourism Institute). However, some Alajuelan politicians would like to see a separate bureau for Alajuela. Alajuela has various national parks including Poás Volcano National Park, Arenal Volcano National Park, Rincón de la Vieja Volcano National Park, Juan Castro Blanco National Park, Los Ángeles Cloud Forest, and Caño Negro Wildlife Refuge, as well as other reserves and protected areas.

Some of the province's tourist industry is centered around La Fortuna, a small town at the base of Arenal Volcano. There, tourists can visit Arenal Eco Zoo, hot spring resorts, tour a large lake below the volcano, go fishing, and visit nature reserves. The Tabacón hot springs, which reach temperatures up to 37 degrees Celsius (98.6 degrees Fahrenheit), are a popular destination for national and international tourists.

Other tourist centers in Alajuela include La Marina Wildlife Rescue Center, Zarcero, and a town known for its public topiary garden. Starting in the 1960s, gardener Evangelisto Blanco began transforming the bushes and cypress trees in Francisco Alvarado Park in the center of town. The town maintains Blanco's tradition and is now attractive. In Sarchí, national and international tourists can visit the country's traditional artisan shops. Geometrically painted oxcarts, furniture and other crafts are some of the artisanal products built in Sarchí. In the municipality of Palmares, there is a large festival every January. The festival has been going on since 1987 and has live music, horse parades, and other traditional events that attract nearly 20,000 visitors each year. Many visitors and businesses go to San Carlos in April each year for an annual cattle market. Grecia is a common stop for tourists traveling from the Central Valley to the Pacific Coast because of El Mundo de los Serpientes (The World of Snakes), a snake zoo and breeding center founded in 1994.

The municipality of Alajuela is also a major tourist attraction. The city's center is a centuries-old cathedral with a plaza where mangoes regularly fall from the trees. Known as "The City of Mangoes", there is a mango festival each June. Next to the plaza, there is a museum dedicated to folk hero Juan Santamaría. This museum is in the old Alajuela Prison building. As of 1999, it encompasses the old city armory, both buildings constructed in the second half of the 19th century. One wing of that museum revives the history behind the Battle of Santa Rosa between Costa Rica and American filibusterer William Walker in 1856, while other sections feature relics and displays from around the country. The museum also portrays local culture, dedicating a team to local artisans and their works, as well as to public theater events such as plays and lectures.

There are many attractions in La Garita and La Guacima, west of the municipality of Alajuela. The Rescate Wildlife Rescue Center (formerly Rescate Animal Zoo Ave), established in 1990, is a bird rehabilitation and breeding center where visitors can view and learn about rare birds. There is also the Botanical Orchid Garden which houses dozens of species of orchids, as well as other plants native to the region. The Butterfly Farm in La Guacima, is another tourist attraction that also exports butterfly eggs and species to scientists and researchers around the world. A popular destination on weekends, many Costa Ricans travel to this region to buy stone ornaments and decorative plants.

== Culture and people ==
=== Literature ===
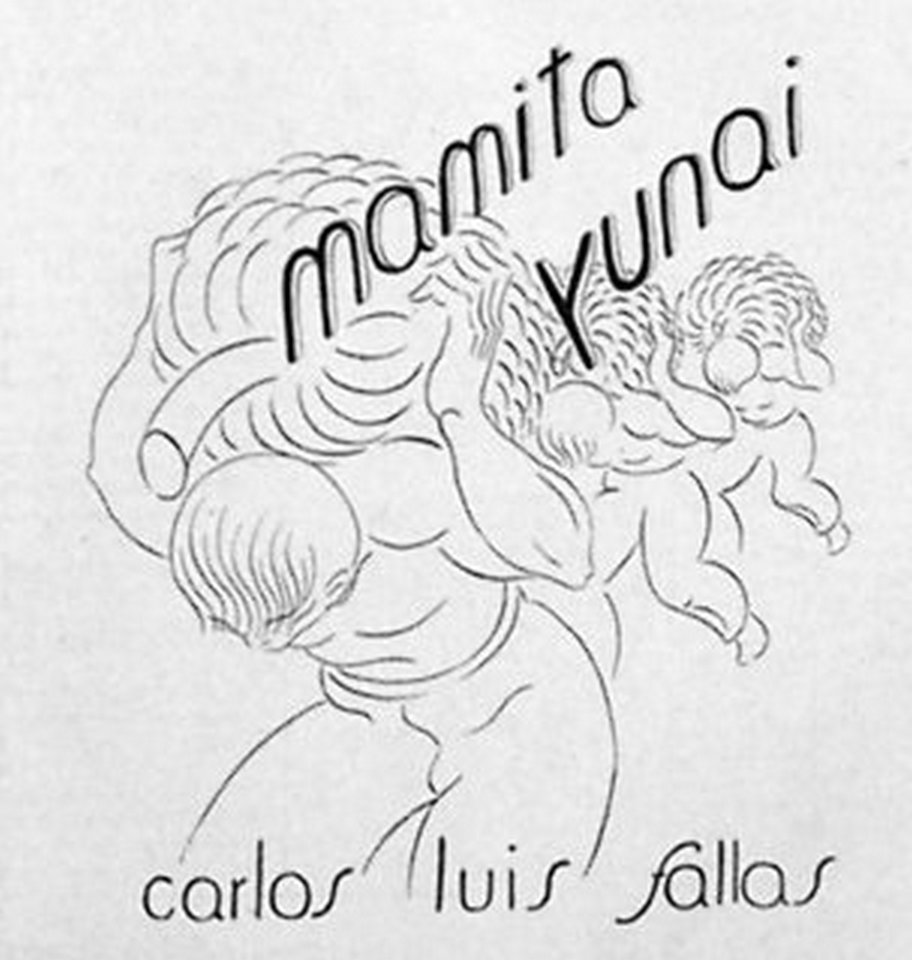
Publicity art for Carlos Luis Fallas' "Mamita Yunai"

Alajuela holds a central place in Costa Rica's literary tradition, as evidenced by the numerous authors born in the country and their commitment to public libraries. There are 14 public libraries in Alajuela, more than any other province in the country. The University of Costa Rica maintains children's literature outreach centers primarily in Alajuela, in Grecia, San Ramón, Naranjo, Palmares and Zarcero. The municipality of Alajuela frequent holds storytelling contests and festivals, as well.

Because of its rich literary tradition, San Ramón is often called "la Tierra de las poetas" ("land of poets"). Many poets and authors were born in the San Ramón area, including José Joaquín Salas Pérez, Carlomagno Araya, Ema Gamboa, and Feliz Ángel Salas. San Ramón's favorite son is often listed as Lisímaco Chavarría. Born in 1878, Chavarría's romantic and naturalist poetry brought him into correspondence with many well-known Latin American authors, such as Rubén Darío, José Enrique Rodó and Joaquín García Monge. Born in 1915, author and naturalist illustrator Rafael Lucas Rodríguez was a pioneering biologist in the country. He wrote numerous articles, books, and illustrative tracts of Costa Rican flora. Author Fernando Contreras Castro, also born and raised in San Ramón, is an internationally recognized author writing in what is described as the "urban generation" style. Contreras teaches literature at the University of Costa Rica.

Social realist Fabián Dobles grew up in Atenas. Dobles' work concentrates on the plight of people experiencing poverty in Costa Rica. Dobles, a member of the Popular Vanguard Party, later spent time in prison for his political beliefs. Author Carlos Luis Fallas was born and educated in Alajuela. Fallas' most well-known work, "Mamita Yunai", was based on his time working on a banana plantation. Historian and journalist Ángela Ulibarri lives in Ciudad Quesada. Contemporary playwright Jorge Arroyo also grew up in Alajuela. His work has been staged in half a dozen countries.

=== Indigenous peoples ===
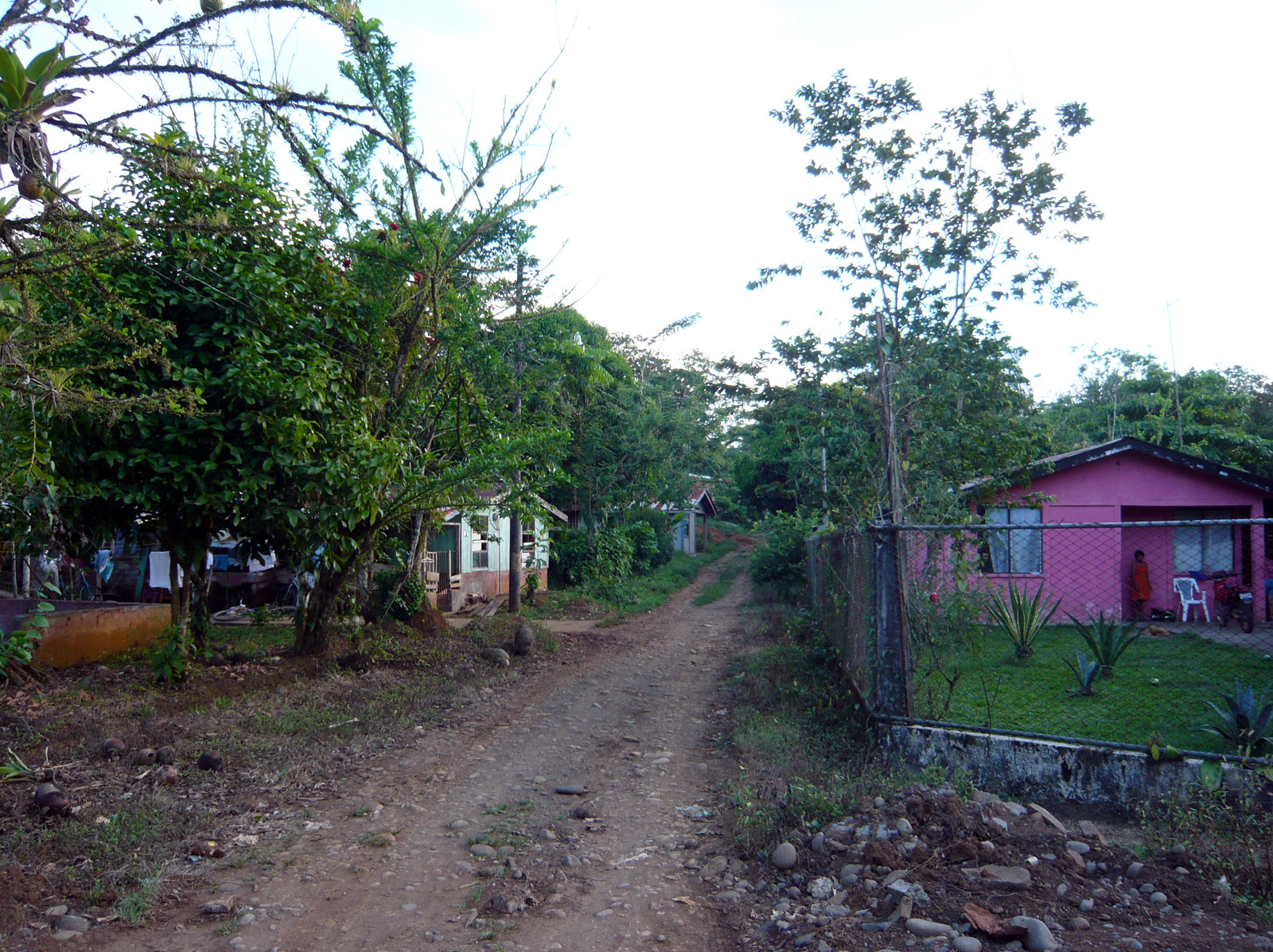
Palenque Margarita

Most of the indigenous tribes of Alajuela were killed during Spanish colonization, although the Botos held out until the mid-1800s. Today, the Maleku are among the few remaining indigenous tribes from the Spanish colonial period. Their reserve is in northern Alajuela, an hour north of La Fortuna at San Rafael de Guatuso. There are three Maleku villages near Guatuso: Palenque Sol, Palenque Tonjibe, and Palenque Margarita, where residents subsist largely from the tourist economy.

=== Education ===
There are many higher-level educational centers in the province. Universidad Técnica Nacional de Costa Rica (UTN) (Technical University of Costa Rica) is the most well-known. UTN was founded in 2008 due to the merger of several colleges. It is the fifth public university in the country and maintains five campuses, including three in Alajuela at San Carlos, Atenas, and close to the municipality of Alajuela. The Instituto Centroamericano de Administración de Empresas (INCAE) (Central American Institute for Business Administration) has a campus in La Garita. INCAE was founded with the help of US during the Cold War with the intention of promoting business education in Central America. The Universidad Adventista de Centroamérica (UAC) (Central American Adventist University) is a private Adventist university in Ceiba. The Universidad Santa Lucía (Santa Lucia University) has a campus in the municipality of Alajuela and San Carlos. San Carlos also has a branch of the Costa Rica Institute of Technology. Founded in 1995, the Universidad de Ciencias Empresariales (UCEM) Business Science University is also located in Alajuela. In addition, there are other higher learning centers with campuses in Costa Rica, such as the Colegio Universitario Boston (Boston University College), which is not associated with Boston University, and the National Learning Institute (INA).

=== Architecture and public art ===
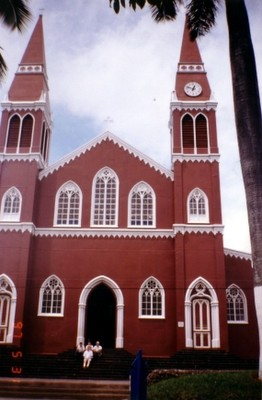
Grecia's sheet metal church

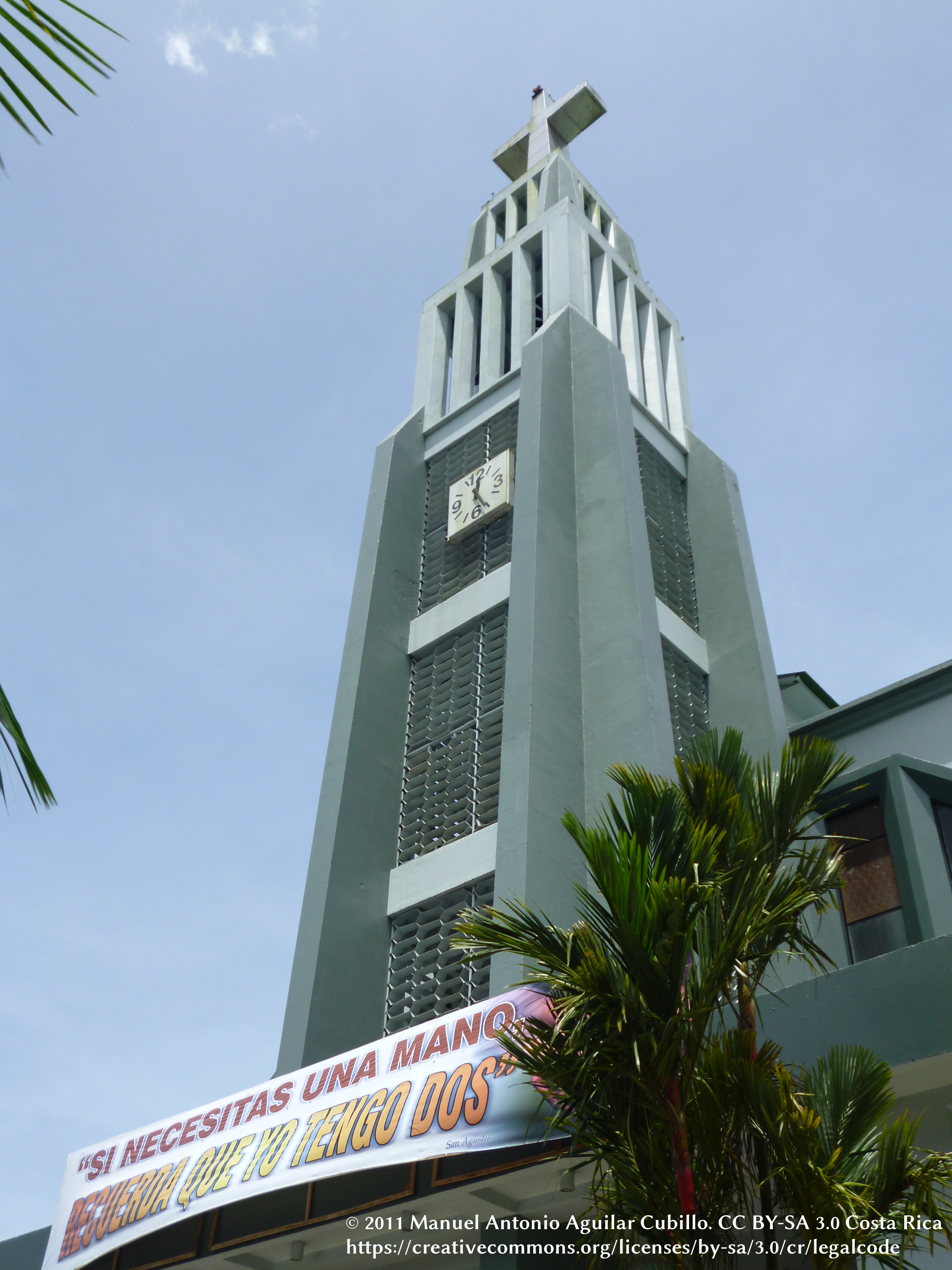
Ciudad Quesada's art deco cathedral

Alajuela has a rich and diverse architectural history, reflected in various styles of churches, schools, houses, and public works projects.

The municipality of Grecia is home to the Iglesia de la Nuestra Señora de las Mercedes (Our Lady of Mercy Church), a church constructed almost entirely of sheet metal. The sheet metal was bought by local investors and shipped from Belgium. Today, it is painted dark red. The province is home to many of Costa Rica's historic churches, including the gothic church in Sarchí, the neo-classical church of Nuestra Señora de las Piedades (Our Lady of Piety) in Naranjo, the neo-classical church of Templo San José in the municipality of Alajuela, and the wooden church in Venecia. At the beginning of the 1900s, an attempt was made to build a church and monument near the top of Cerro Espíritu Santo (Holy Spirit Mountain) outside of San Miguel de Naranjo. The church was never completed due to frequent tremors and difficulties financing its construction. Today, the partially constructed church and amphitheater are a popular tourist stop on the way toward Volcán Arenal.

Several schools in the province are also national monuments, including the art deco Escuela Jorge Washington in San Ramón built in 1931, the neo classical Escuela Pedro Aguirre Cerda in Poas, and the neo-colonial Escuela de Hacienda Vieja. The Escuela Central (Central School) of Atenas is national monument, built of galvanized steel. It is an art deco design built in the first half of the 20th century.

In the municipality of Alajuela, there are three well-known churches. The Ermita de la Concepción en El Llano (The Hermitage of Plains Conception) is one of the few remaining adobe-and-cane churches in the country. Built in 1881, a project for its restoration began in 2000. The current site of the Central Cathedral of Alajuela was first blessed as a church in 1790. It was expanded in 1813, but replaced with the current Cathedral between 1854 and 1863, designed by Francisco Kurtze. In 1888, the red cupola was added based on designs from Swiss architect Gustavo Casallini, giving the Central Cathedral its distinctive look.

Also in the municipality are several other buildings from the 1800s, built in neo-classical style. They are directly off the central plaza, including the Antigua Carcel (Old Prison), Antigua Gobernación (Old Capital), Templo Metodista "El Mesías" ("Messiah" Methodist Temple), Antiguo Cuartel (Old Barracks), and the neo-classical Antiguo Instituto de Alajuela y Salón de Actos (Old Alajuelan Government Building). Iglesia de la Agonía, built in 1825, is an adobe colonial church with white Spanish style brickwork. The art deco Escuela Ascensión Esquivel Ibarra and Hospital San Rafael are also within the municipality.

The Puente de Las Damas (Ladies' Bridge), built in 1844, is another national monument in Atenas. Stories differ on the origin of the name. According to many people, construction was organized by well-known "high society" women, including the widow of former head-of-state Manuel Fernández Chacón, Dolores Oreamuno. Other sources claim the name comes from the nearby planting of cestrum nocturnum, which is often called "lady of the night" in Spanish. In 1853, German traveler Wilhelm Marr commented that the bridge was a "spectacular mix of nature and art". Reconstructed, the bridge still stands on the old highway to Puntarenas, providing an avenue for farmers to transport coffee to the Pacific coast, as it did in the past. Outside of Grecia, El Puente de Piedra (the Stone Footbridge) has given rise to so many folk-tales and legends that it is also a national monument. It is a natural formation that has been complemented to allow visitors to traverse.

There are many examples of public art in the province—several statues dedicated to the national hero Juan Santamaría. The most famous is the municipality of Alajuela, which was supported and initially financed by the Legislative Assembly of Costa Rica. Funding for the statue was first approved in 1887 and it was built by Aristide Croisy, a French sculptor. The statue and the two cannons next to it were installed in 1891. Nicaraguan poet Rubén Darío's poem, "¡Bronce al soldado Juan!" was inspired by the statue. Also in the municipality are statues dedicated to Próspero Fernández Oreamuno, José Joaquín Mora Porras, León Fernández Bonilla, Miguel Obregón Lizano, Juan Manuel Meoño Herrera, Santiago Crespo Calvo (outside the Santiago Crespo Retirement Home), and Francisco de Paula Pereira Matamoros. Opposite the airport is the Farmer's Park, where the Monumento al Agricultor (Farmer's Monument) is located. It was vandalized in 2014 but quickly restored. In addition, there are numerous murals throughout the urban centers of Alajuela, including César Valverde Vega's in the Clínica de Alajuela.

Sarchí is home to the world's largest ox cart. It is displayed in the central park.

Architect Ibo Bonilla was born in Sarchí. Bonilla designed the Latin American Science and Technology University (ULACIT) and the Ibero American Hospital, among other projects. In addition, Bonilla remodeled the Central Bank of Costa Rica, the International Bank of Costa Rica, and many cultural spots in San José, including the Pre-Columbian Gold Museum.

== Sport ==
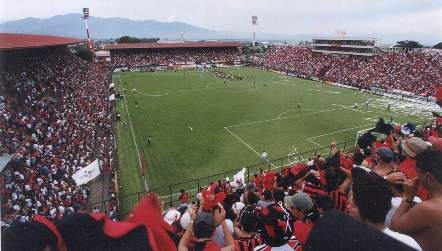
Alejandro Morera Soto Stadium

The municipality of Alajuela is home to the Liga Deportiva Alajuelense, one of Costa Rica's most successful soccer clubs. La Liga was founded in 1919 and became a founding member of the Liga Nacional de Fútbol (National Football League) two years later. Between 1928 and 2018, La Liga won 29 national championships. La Liga plays at the Alejandro Morera Soto Stadium, which has served as a national stadium and seats 18,000 spectators.

Frequent Costa Rica First Division teams in the province include Asociación Deportiva Carmelita, which won the national championship in 1961, A.D. San Carlos, and Asociación Deportiva Ramonense. Other teams include Municipal Grecia, Selección de Cacao, Municipal Santa Ana, Sarchí, Selección de Canoas, Higuiteña, Upala (Guatuso), and COFUTPA Palmarés. Club Deportivo Alajuela Junior existed between 1933 and 1936.

Bullfighting in Costa Rica is less dangerous for animals than in other parts of the world, and Alajuela is no exception. Every January in Palmares, bullfighting is the center of the city's annual festival. In 2013, an amateur rodeo clown was killed while trying to annoy the bulls in the Palmares bullfighting ring. The speedway track in La Guacima is often the site of such bullfighting events. Other smaller events are staged at festivals throughout the province.

== Infrastructure ==
=== Transportation ===
Aeropuerto Internacional Juan Santamaría

Costa Rica's busiest airport is in southern Alajuela. The Aeropuerto Internacional Juan Santamaría (Juan Santamaría International Airport) is the second busiest airport in Central America. There are other local airports in La Fortuna, Los Chiles, and Upala.

Asphalted roads connect the major cities in Alajuela, whether they are highways or secondary roads. The General Cañas Highway connects the municipality of Alajuela to San José and was the subject of national ridicule when a sinkhole temporarily closed it in 2012, causing enormous traffic problems throughout the metropolitan region. The Colon of Mora to Orotina connects Orotina to San José. The Pan-American Highway runs through the province.

In 1926, Alajuela was the scene of one of the worst railroad disasters in history. High above the Virilla River, a train carrying pilgrims to the Virgen de los Ángeles derailed, killing 248 passengers and injuring a further 93. Two of Alajuela's defunct railroad stations are classified as national monuments: the Estación del Ferrocarril al Pacífico (Pacific Railroad Station) in Orotina and the Antigua Estación del Ferrocarril en Río Grande (Old Río Grande Railroad Station) in Atenas. Río Grande's railroad bridge is also a national monument.

President José María Figueres Olsen closed the rail transportation system following damage during an earthquake and external pressure to liberalize the nation's resources; however, work is underway to reopen the rails. The Instituto Costarricense de Ferrocarriles (INCOFER) (Costa Rican Railroad Institute) is working to reopen the terminals and rails that link Alajuela and the other cities in the Central Valley. It is scheduled to open in 2014. In 2012, a proposal was made to build a train from Alajuela to Cartago but the project never got underway and was eventually scrapped.

=== Health services ===
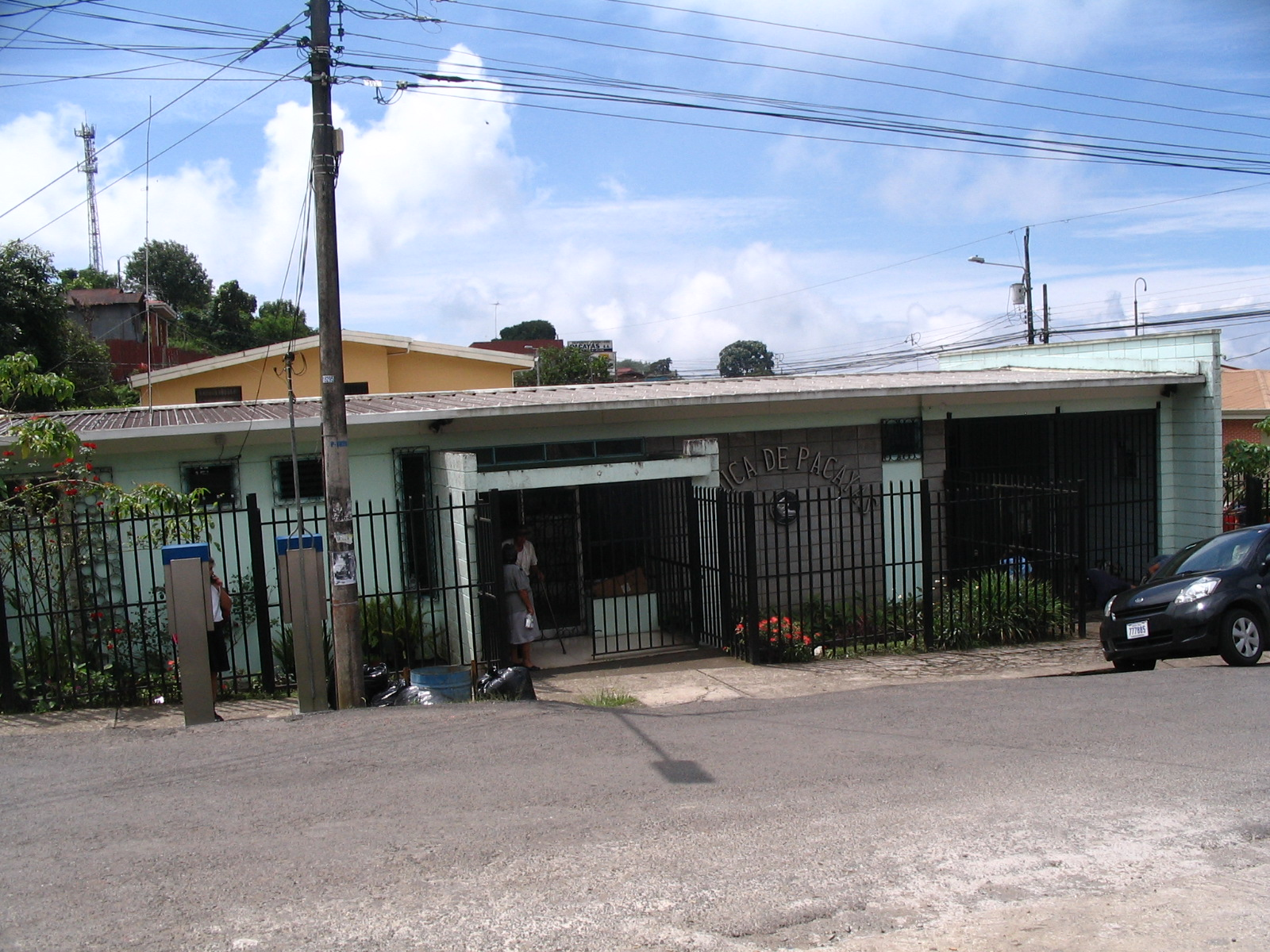
Typical EBAIS

The entire province is serviced through the Caja Costarricense del Seguro Social (Caja) (Costa Rican Department of Social Insurance). Cities and towns of significant size have Equipos Básicos de Atención Integral en Salud (EBAIS) (Basic Medical Attention Center) facilities. In addition, one of Costa Rica's largest hospitals, Hospital San Rafael, is in the municipality of Alajuela. Grecia is home to the Hospital San Francisco de Asís, built-in 1858 by Ramón Quesada. Hospital Los Chiles is the northernmost hospital in the country. The old hospital in Quesada, built in the first half of the 20th century and no longer in use, is a national monument.

=== Other public services ===
Like the rest of the country, nearly half of the water services are provided by the Instituto Costarricense de Acueductos y Alcantarillados (AyA) (Costa Rican Institute of Aqueducts and Sewers). Water service did not arrive to the northern city of Upala until 1976, but it was recently bolstered in the cantons of the north of Los Chiles, La Urruca, and Coquitales.

National trash collection is governed by the 8839 Law (Gestión Integral de Residuos Sólidos). The municipalities of Alajuela, Atenas, Grecia, Naranjo, Palmares, Poás, and San Ramón have collective trash removal services.

Electricity did not arrive in the northern part of the province until 1978. Grecia is home to a new hydroelectric plant, constructed in 2012. The hydroelectric dam at Lake Arenal generates between 12% and 17% of the country's electricity. There are a growing number of wind turbines that generate electricity in the province, including a plant at Tierras Morenas.

== Political divisions ==
Alajuela has 16 cantons.

Canton (Head city)

1. Alajuela (Alajuela)
2. San Ramón (San Ramón)
3. Grecia (Grecia)
4. San Mateo (San Mateo)
5. Atenas (Atenas)
6. Naranjo (Naranjo)
7. Palmares (Palmares)
8. Poás (San Pedro de Poás)
9. Orotina (Orotina)
10. San Carlos (Quesada)
11. Zarcero (Zarcero)
12. Sarchí (Sarchí Norte)
13. Upala (Upala)
14. Los Chiles (Los Chiles)
15. Guatuso (San Rafael)
16. Río Cuarto (Río Cuarto)

== Notable residents ==
- Gabriela Traña, Olympic marathon runner
- Alejandro Morera Soto – Barcelona soccer player
- Juan Santamaría – hero of 1856
- Ibo Bonilla Oconitrillo, sculptor, architect, and teacher
- Julio Acosta García, 24th President of Costa Rica
- Anastasio Alfaro, zoologist, geologist, genealogist, and explorer
- Fernando Contreras Castro, Novelist
- León Cortés Castro, 28th President of Costa Rica
- Carlos Luis Fallas, writer and Communist leader
- Rafael Lucas Rodríguez, biologist, botanist, and artist
- José Figueres Ferrer, first president of the new republic

== See also ==
- Grecia, the first toucan to receive a prosthetic beak

== Gallery ==
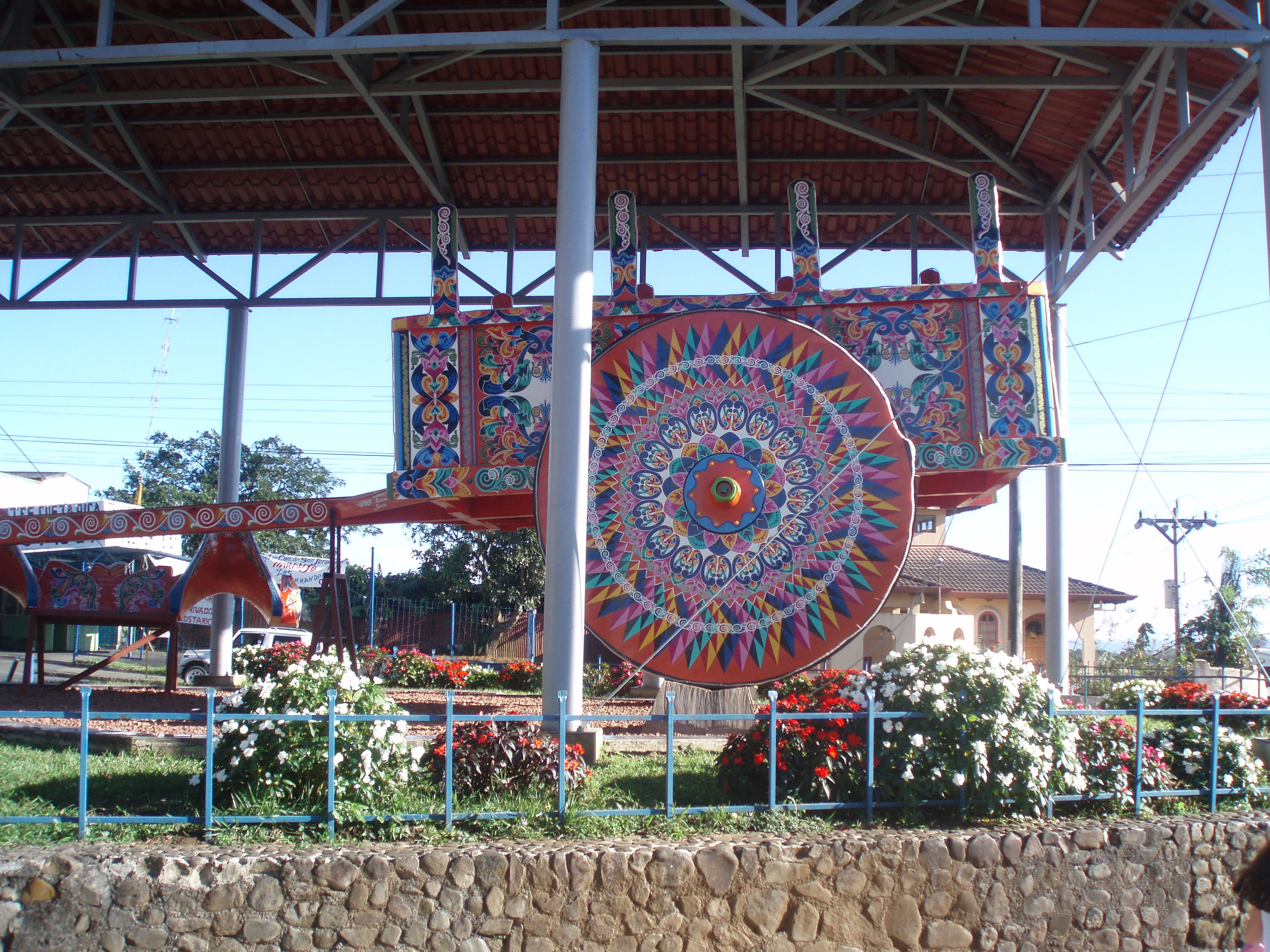
World's Largest Oxcart, Sarchí

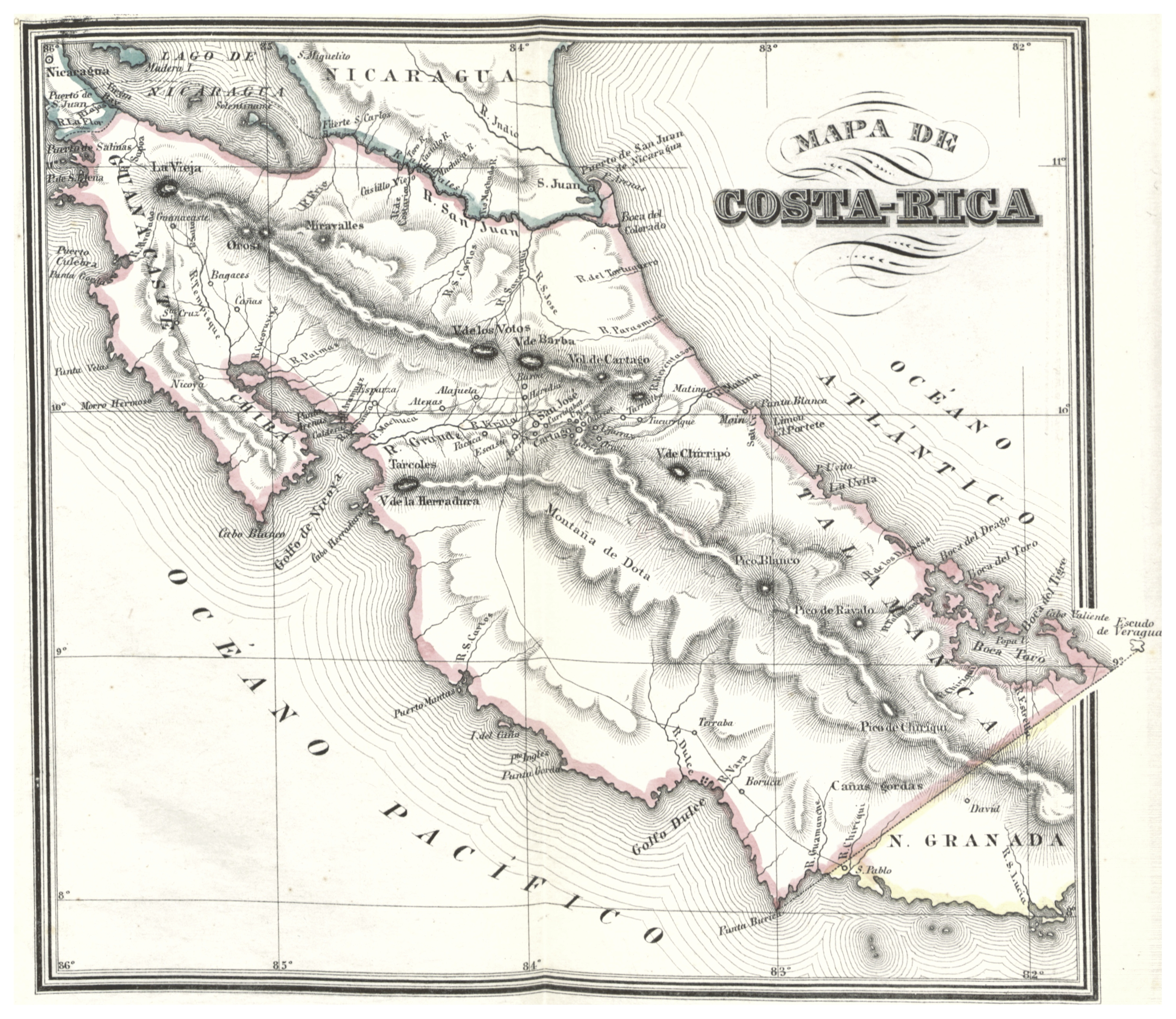
Map of Costa Rica (1850) showing the municipalities of Alajuela and Atenas

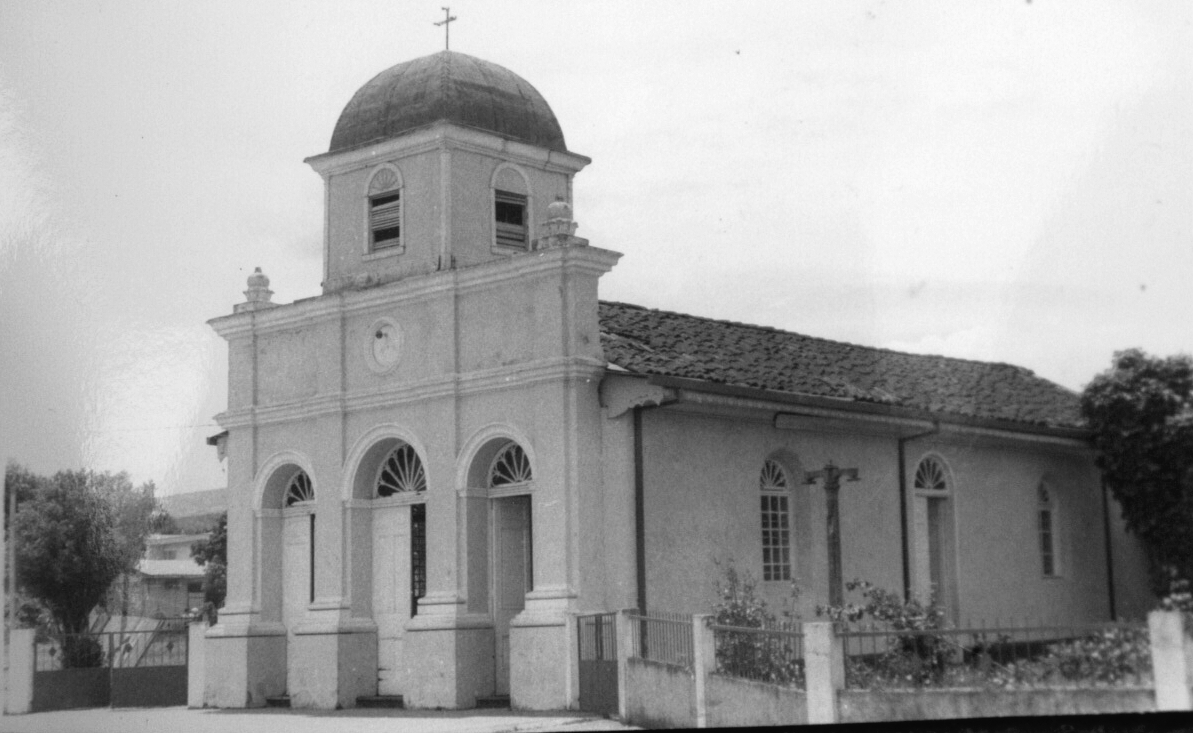
The Plains Hermitage, Alajuela

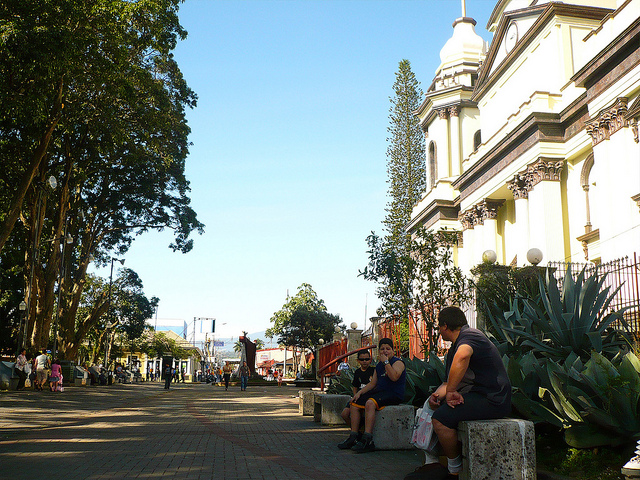
Cathedral of Alajuela and Central Park

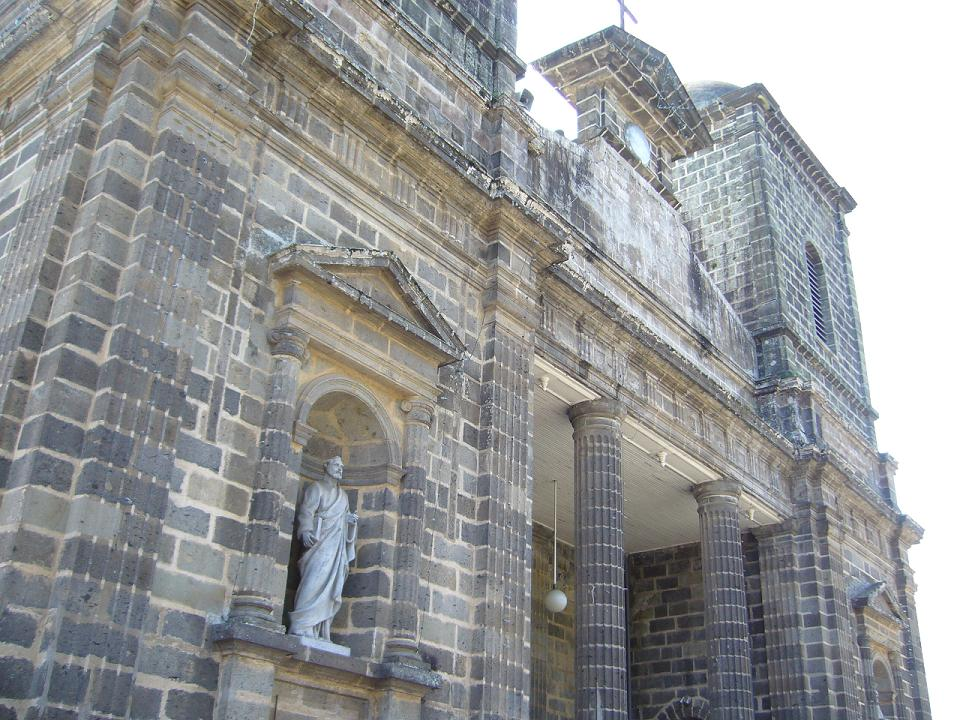
Cathedral of Palmares

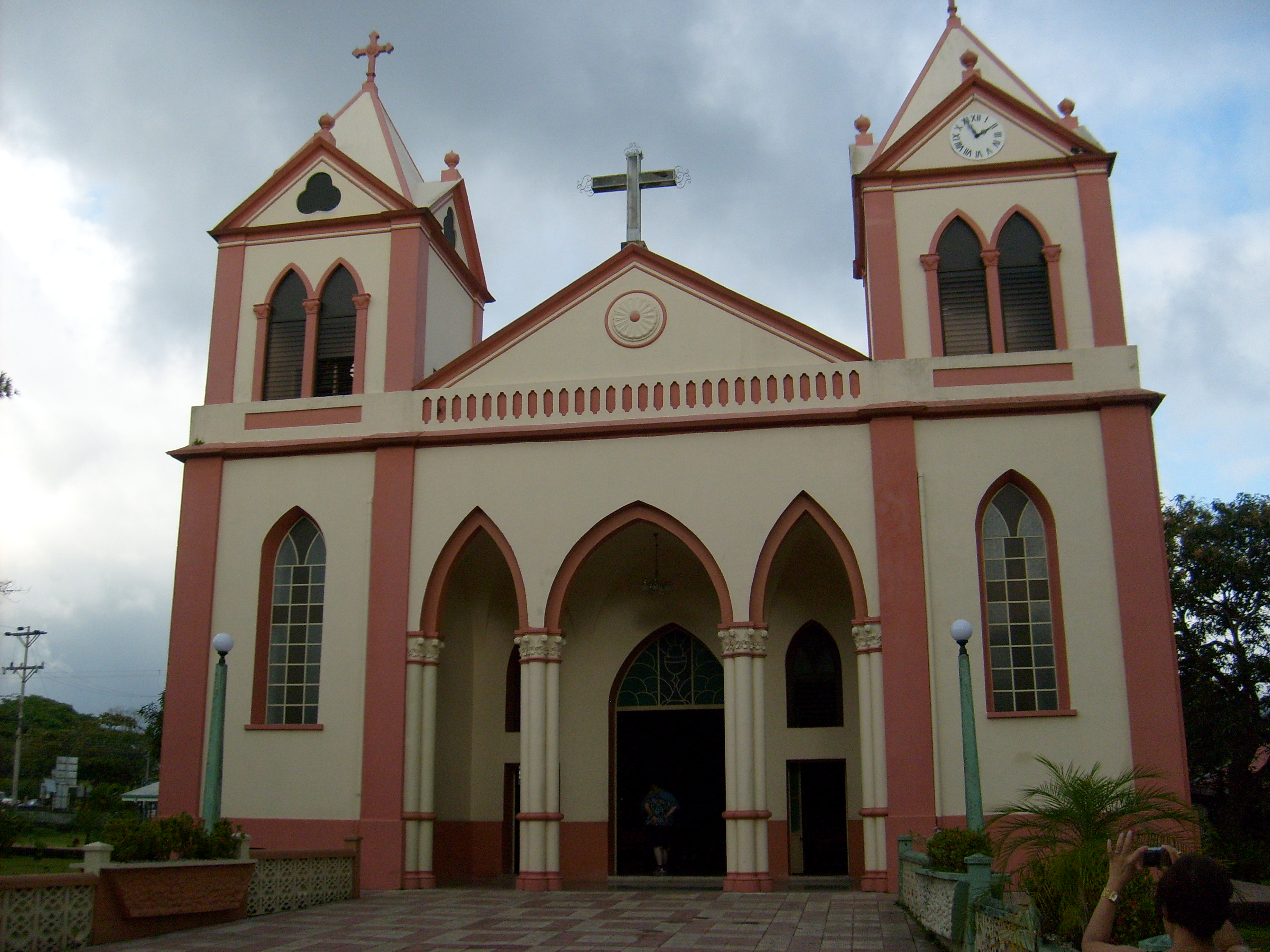
Church in San Mateo de Alajuela

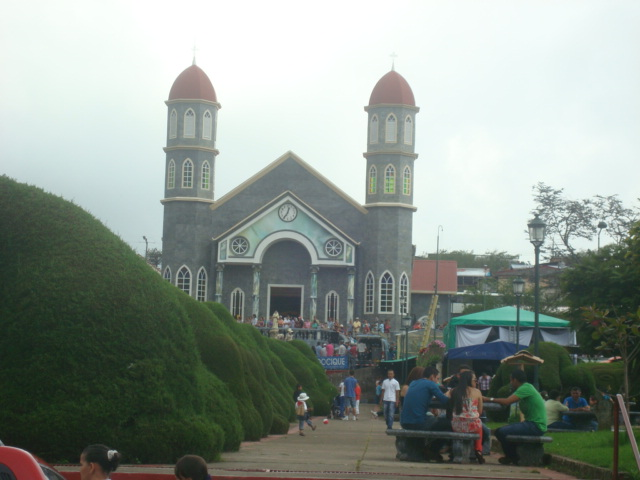
Zarcero church and topiary

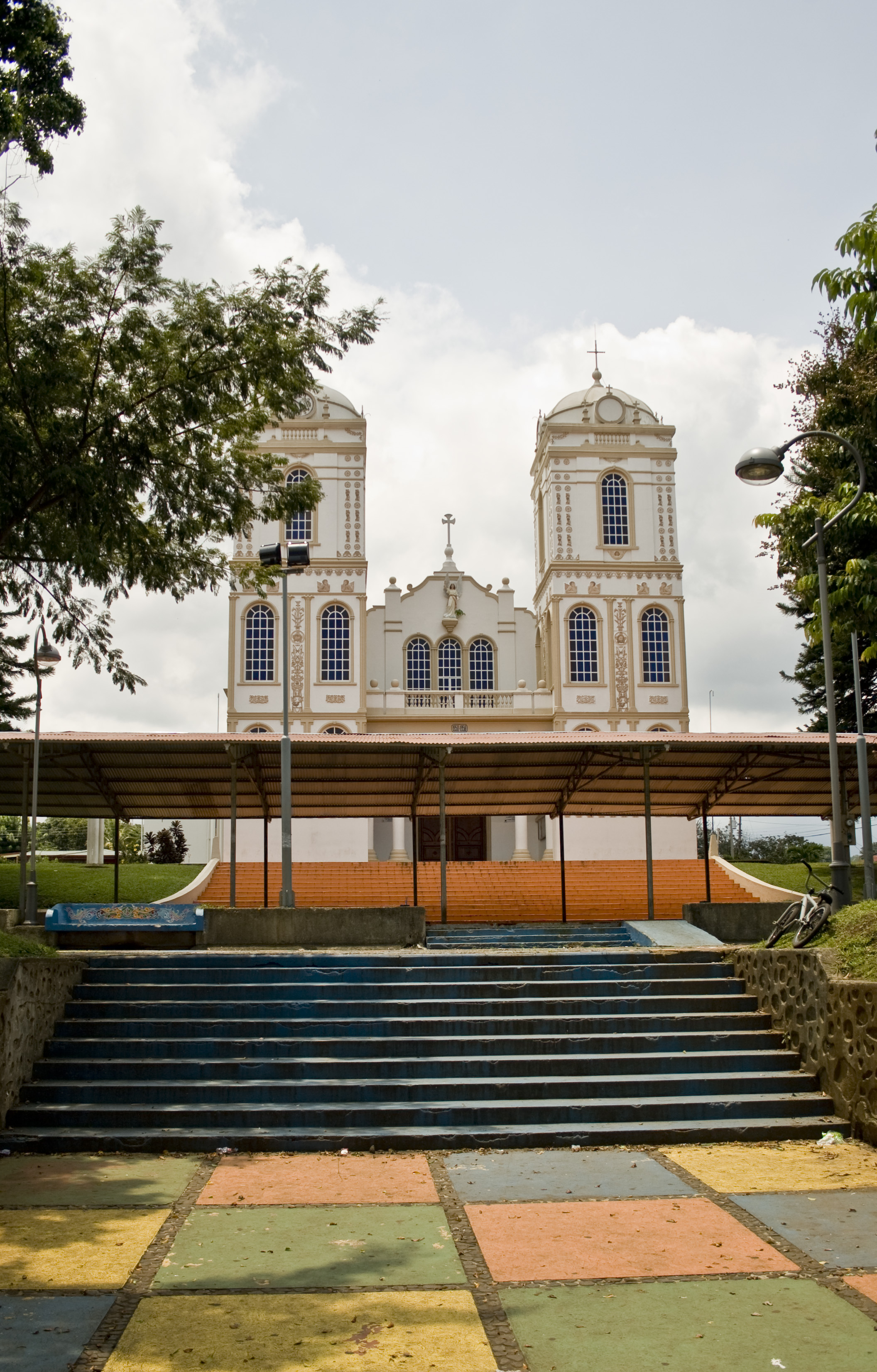
Sarchí Norte church

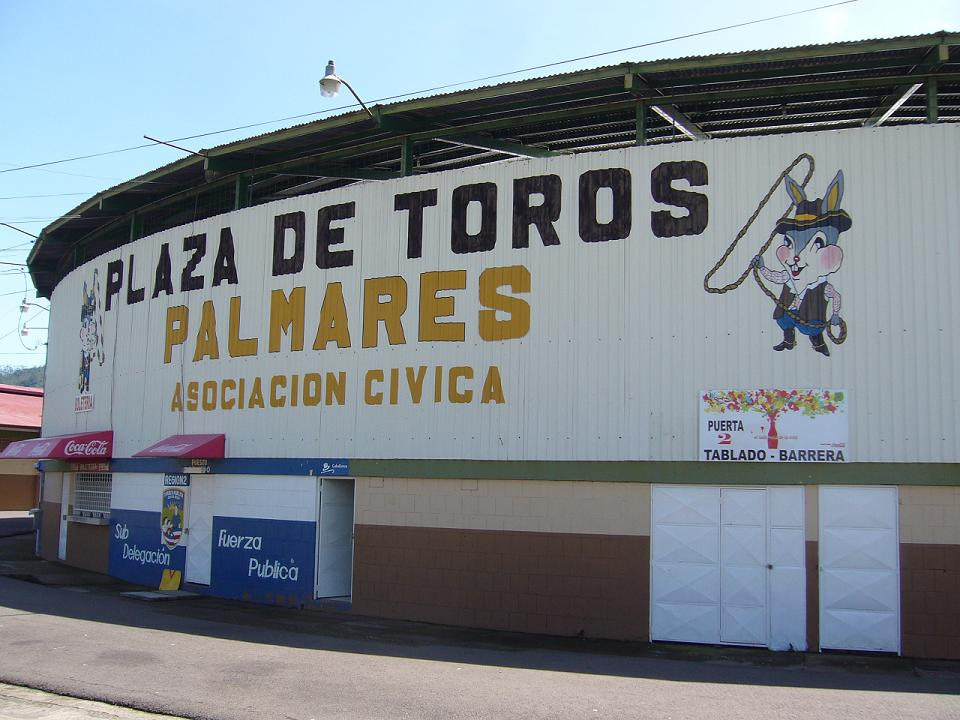
Bullfighting ring in Palmares

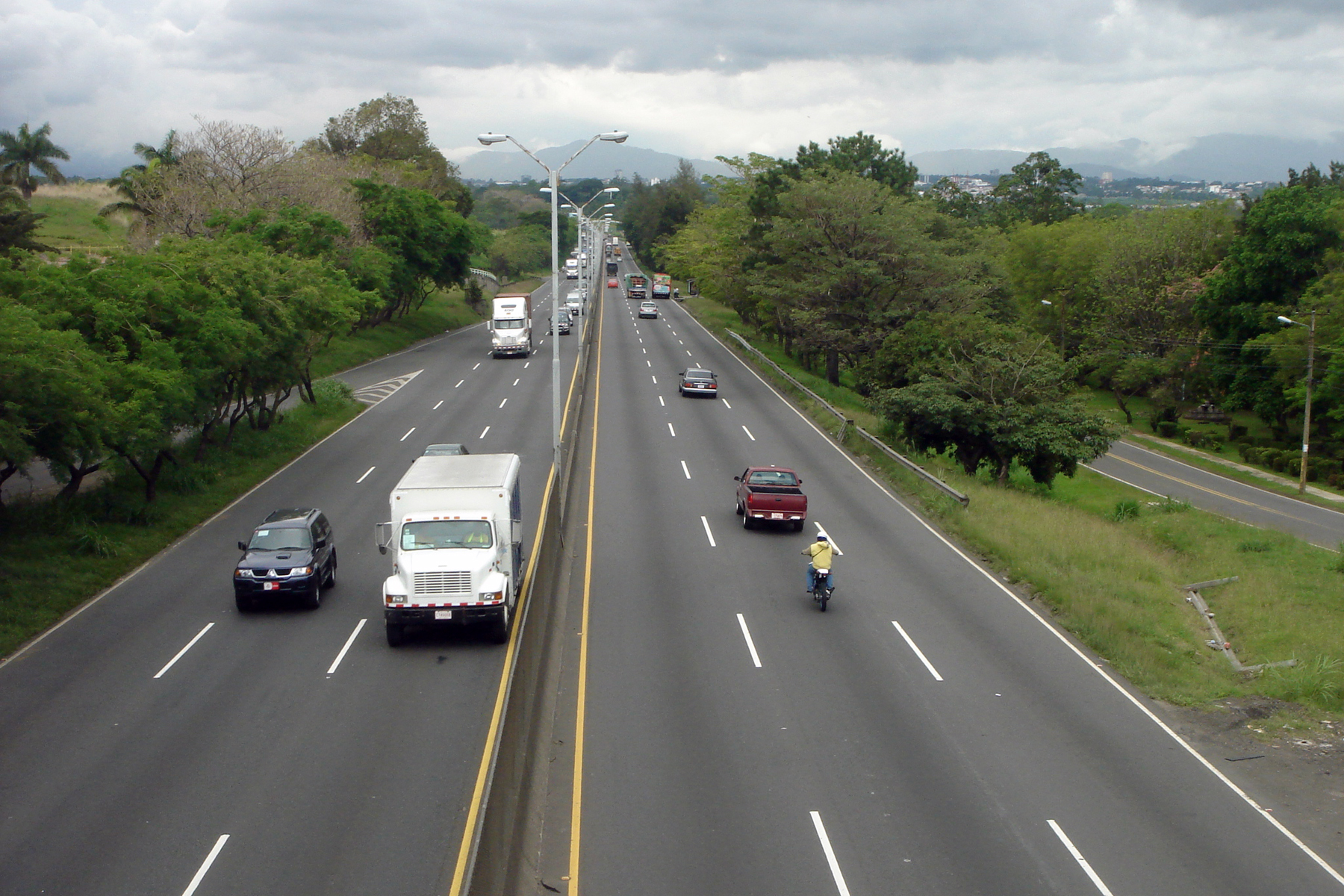
General Cañas Highway

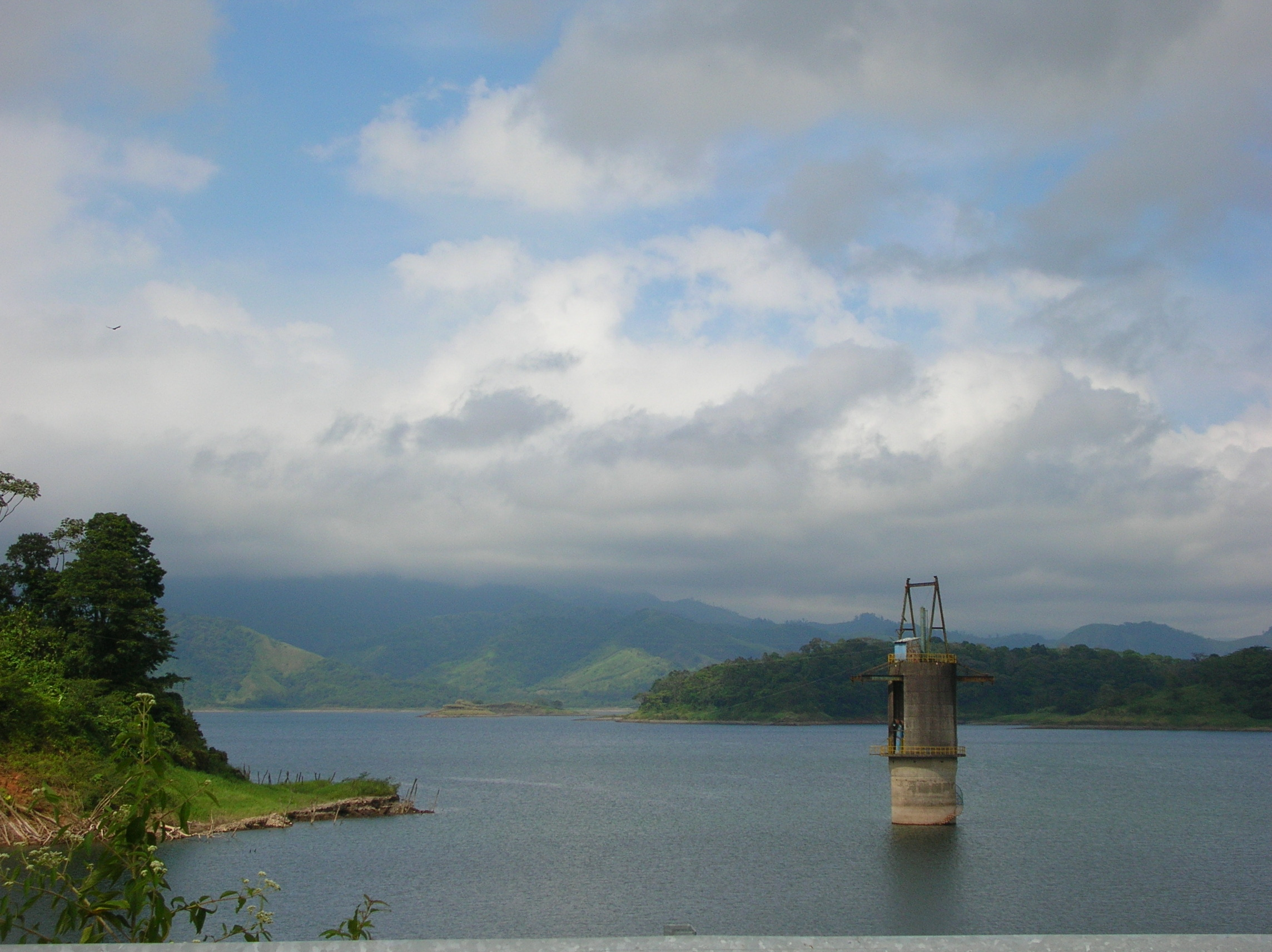
Lake Arenal created by hydroelectric dam

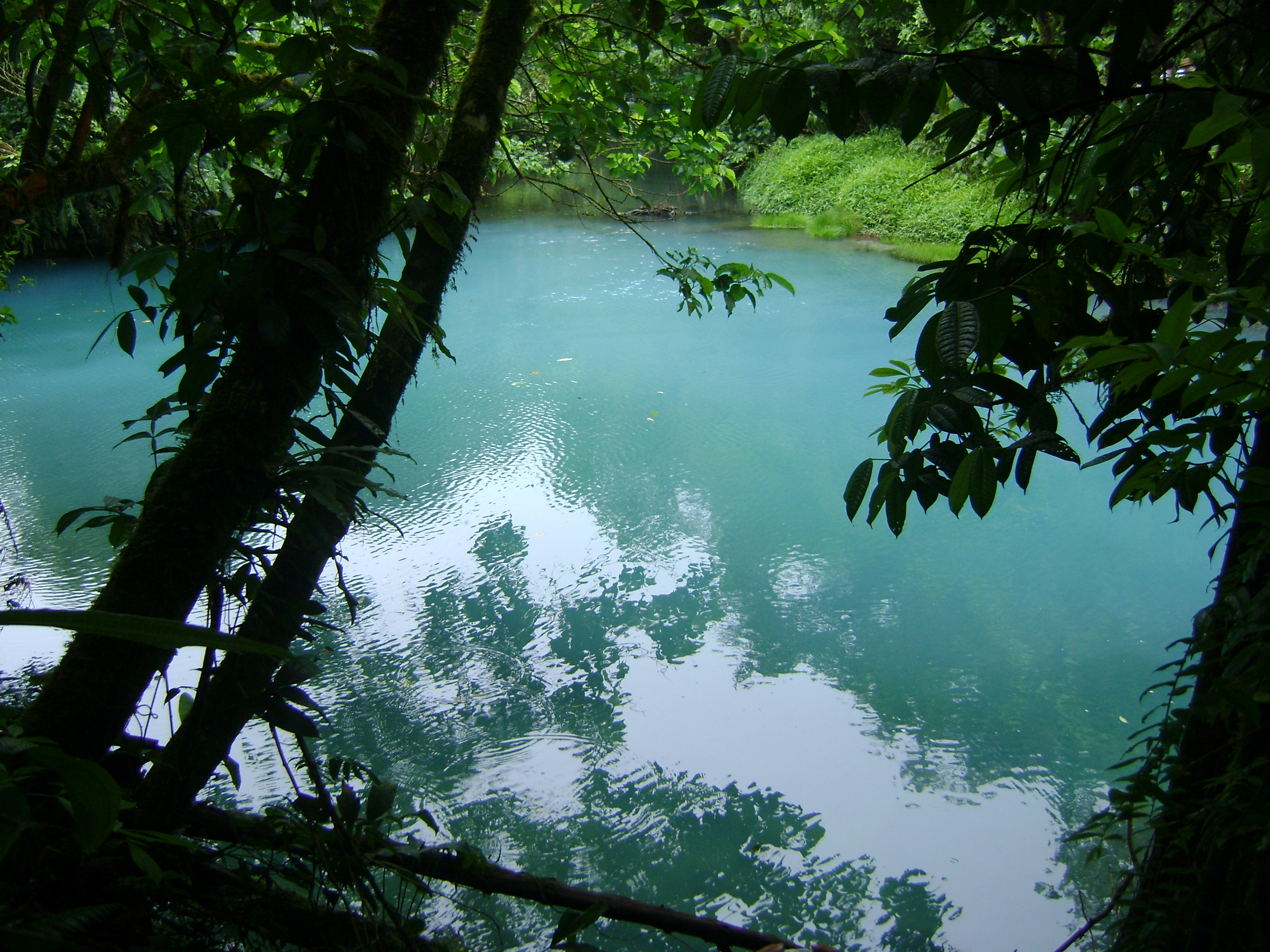
River Celeste in Upala

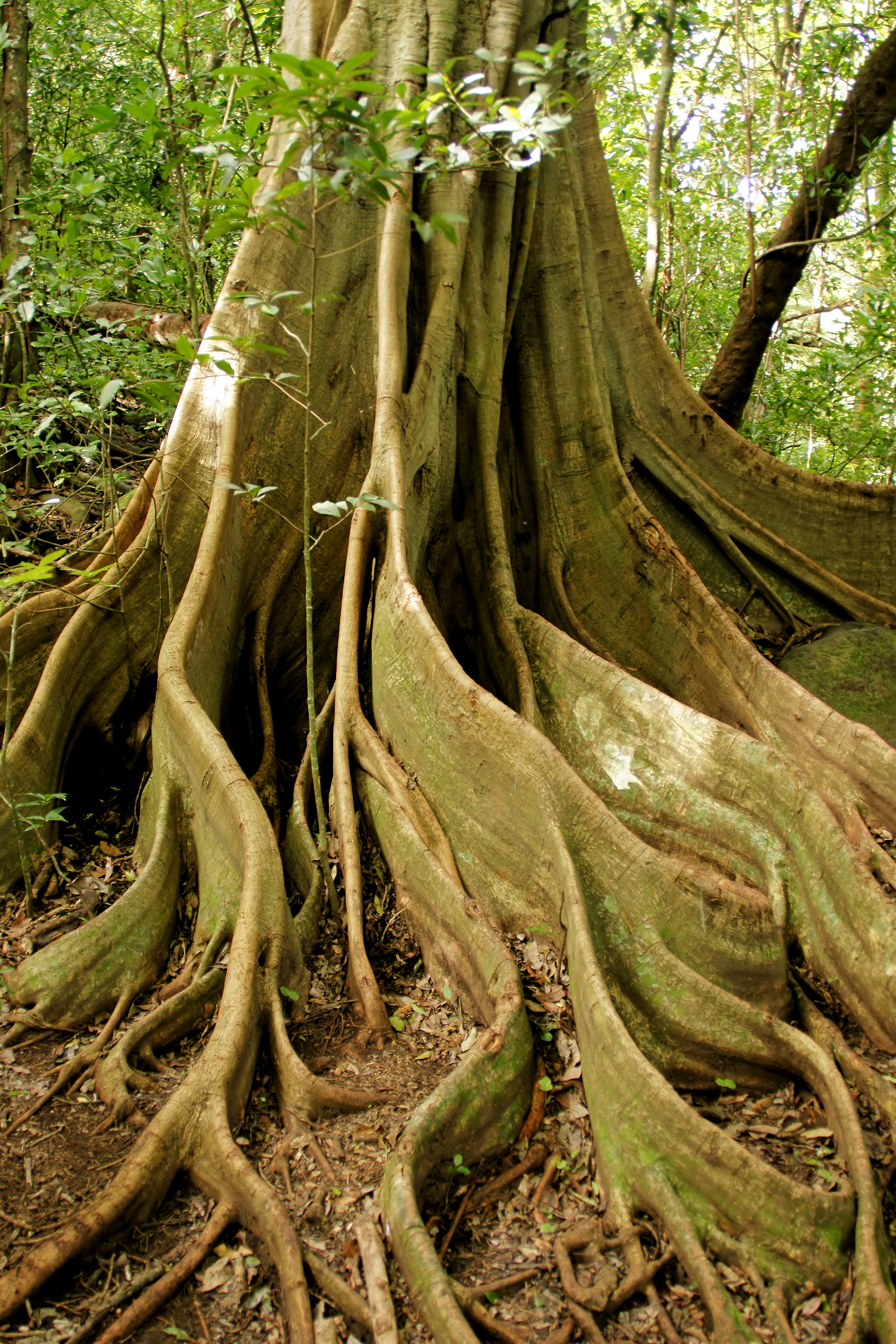
Ficus aurea (buttresses)

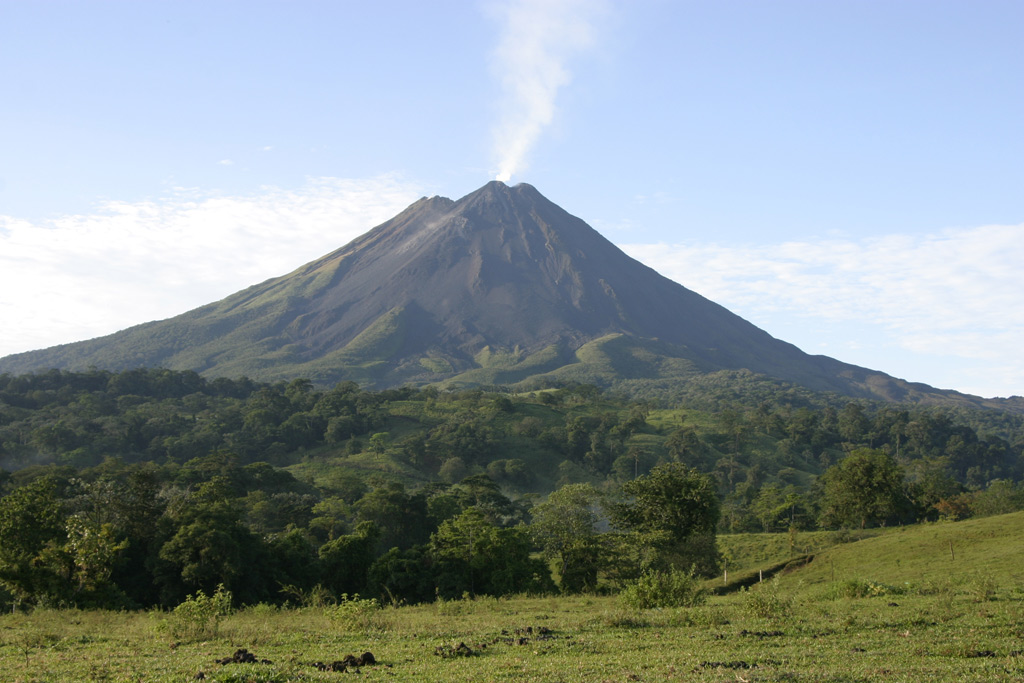
Arenal Volcano
