= Arenal Eco Zoo =

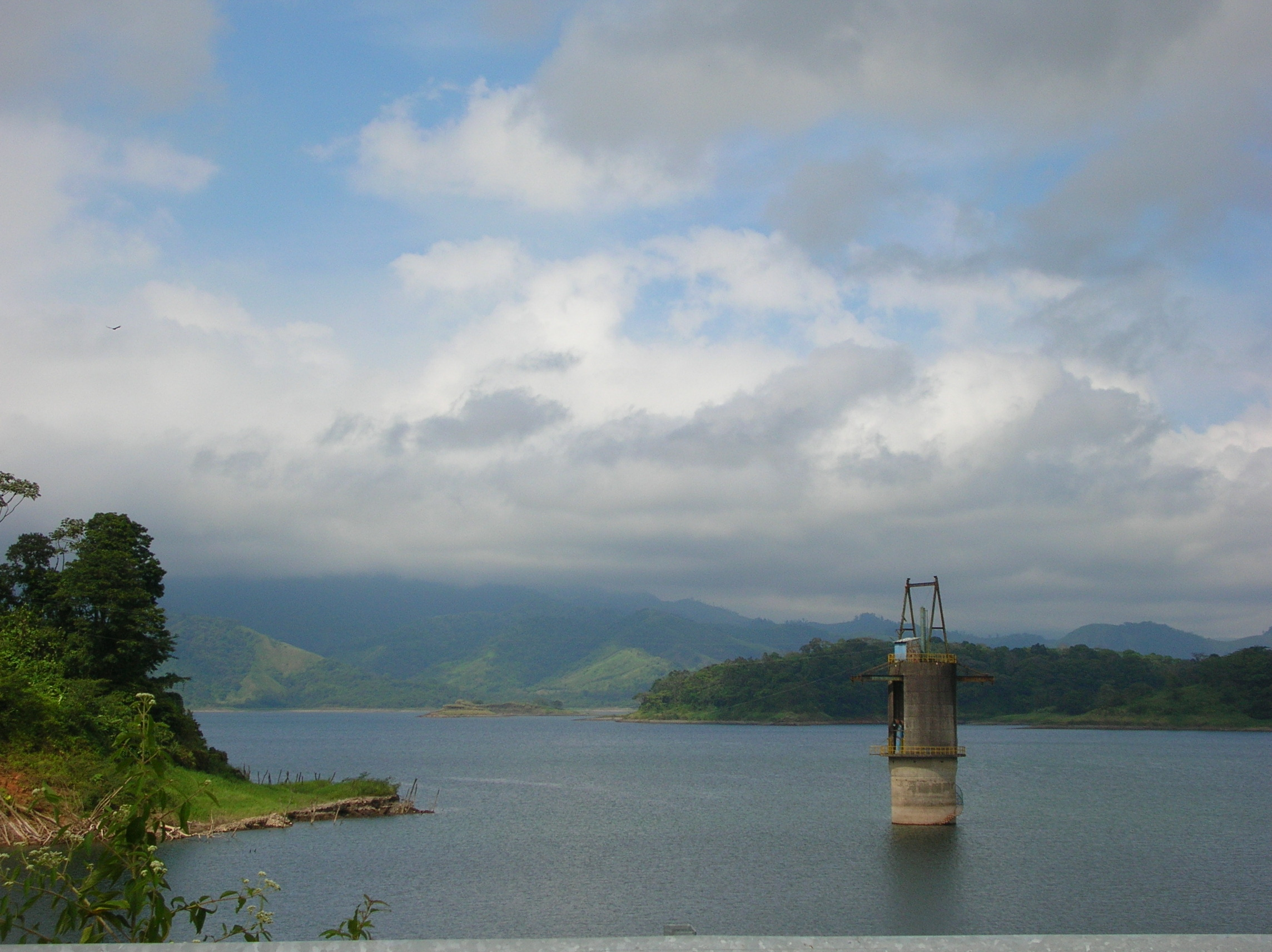
- Lake Arenal
- Interactive map of Arenal Eco Zoo
- 10.4248187°N 84.752048°W
- Location: Alajuela Province; Costa Rica
- No. of animals: 70+ species
- Website: ArenalEcoZoo.com/

The Arenal Eco Zoo is a nature center located in western Alajuela Province, Costa Rica. It is located across Lake Arenal, west of Arenal Volcano National Park, right at the border between Alajuela and Guanacaste Provinces.

== Description ==
The center has a number of educational exhibits, a wide variety of more than 70 snake species, reptiles are also on display, as are more than 30 species of frogs, and a display of spiders and insects. The zoo also organizes naturalist trips and tours to view of over 40 species of butterfly into the surrounding jungle to emulate that of the natural habitats of the species.

The center also has many arachnid and insect species including tarantulas, rhinoceros beetles and giant 5 inch caterpillars.

The zoo was founded by Victor Hugo Quesada and his wife Ofelia in 2000. Its original name was El Serpentario Zoologico del Castillo. Today it is known as the Arenal Eco Zoo.

== See also ==
- List of zoos by country: Costa Rica zoos
