= Iglesia de la Agonía =

Church in Alajuela, Costa Rica

Coordinates: 10°1′2.90″N 84°12′31.20″W

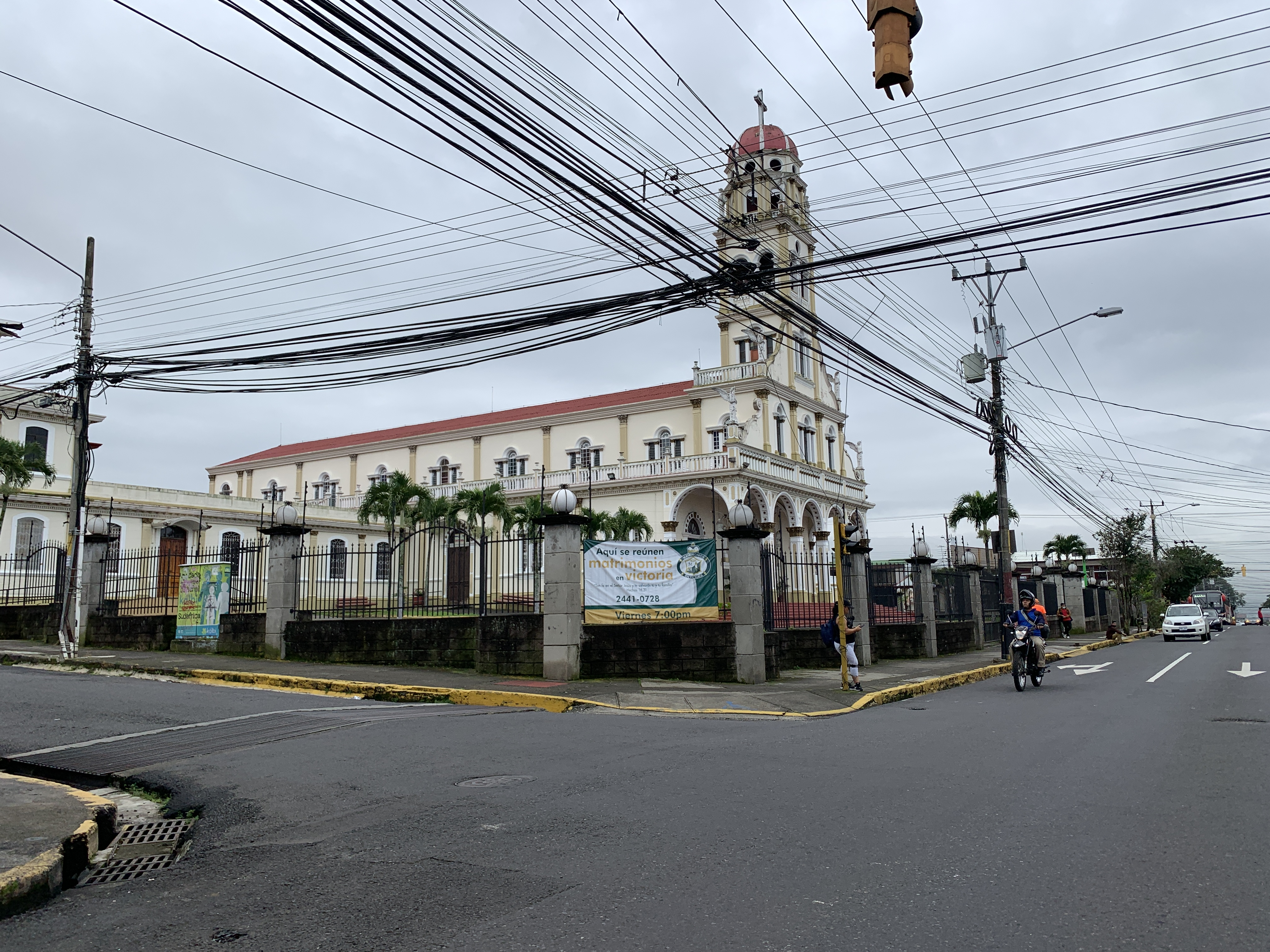
Exterior view

The Iglesia de la Agonía is a Roman Catholic church in Alajuela, Costa Rica. Built in 1825, it is an adobe colonial church and is recognisable by its white Spanish style brickwork.

The church contains a small museum of notable religious artwork.

Homeless people congregate near the church.
