= Tabacón =

Thermal springs in Costa Rica

Coordinates: 10.487990°N 84.722374°W

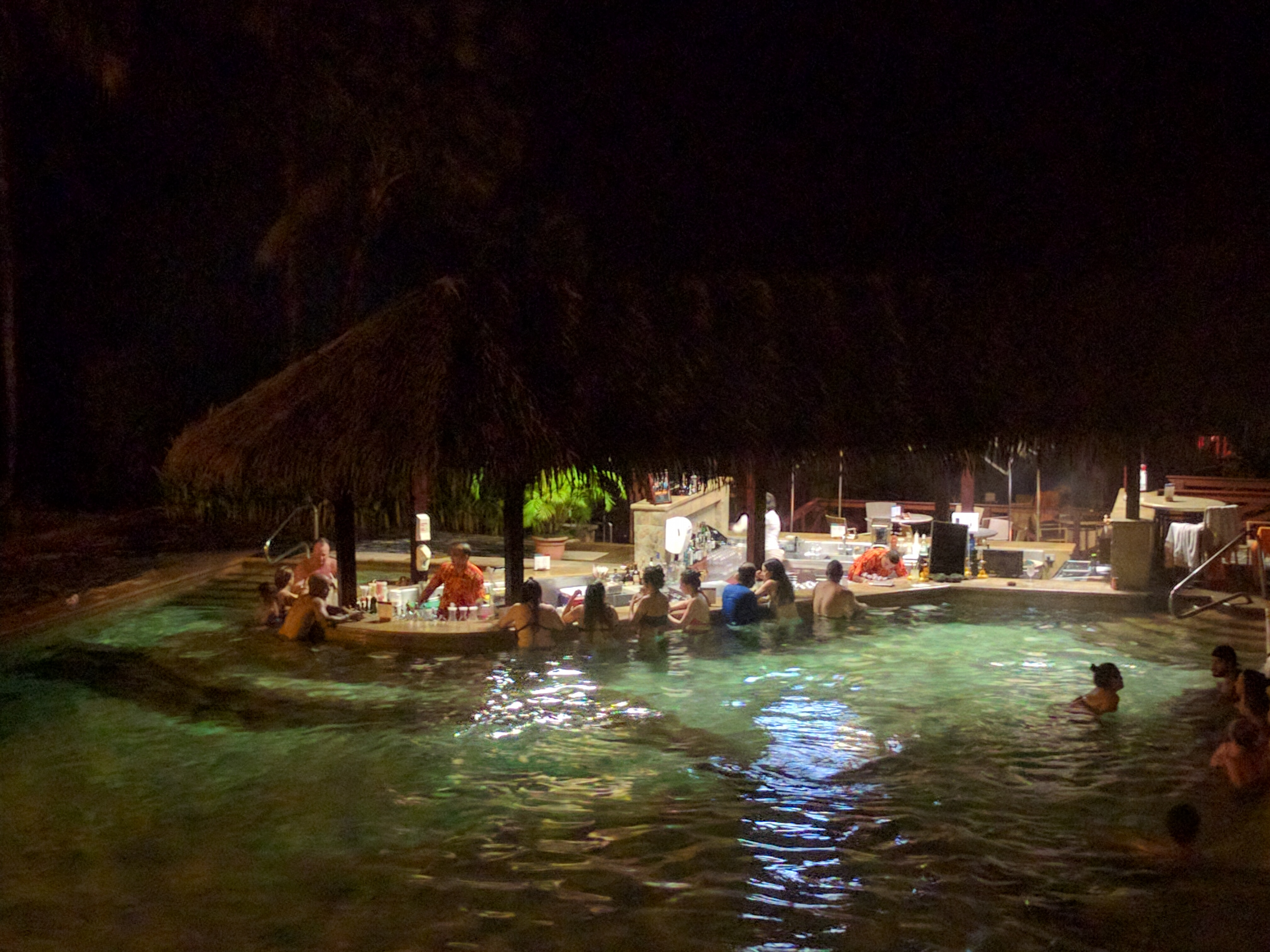
A bar by the hot springs located in the resort.

Tabacón is a hot spring resort and ecohotel located in Nuevo Arenal, Alajuela Province, Costa Rica, twelve kilometres (7.5 mi) northwest of La Fortuna. It lies on the flanks of Arenal Volcano, which it uses to heat its springs. The geothermal springs have a range between 72 and 105°F (22–41°C).

The resort was founded in 1991 by Costa Rican architect Jaime Mikowski, taking two years to develop the resort, and was opened in April 1993. It consists of 105 rooms, three restaurants, five bars, a spa and event room. It occupies 300 hectares of rainforest.

Tabacón aims to be environmentally friendly, and has a rating of 5 'leaves' from the Costa Rican Tourism Board. The hotel has furthermore won several awards for sustainability, including Sustainable Travel International's Luxury Eco Certification Standard in June 2010, and the Green World Award by Seven Stars and Stripes in 2009. The resort is carbon neutral.
