= La Marina Wildlife Rescue Center =

- Interactive map of La Marina Wildlife Rescue Center
- 10.3777852°N 84.3755827°W
- Date opened: 1957
- Location: Alajuela Province; Costa Rica
- No. of animals: 450+ species
- Website: ZooCostaRica.com

La Marina Wildlife Rescue Center (Spanish: Centro de Rescate La Marina), or La Marina Zoo is an animal rescue centre located 8.5 km northeast of Ciudad Quesada, between Palmera and Aguas Zarcas, in the Alajuela Province of Costa Rica. The centre is dedicated to the rehabilitation of mistreated, injured, orphaned, and/or confiscated animals. Once the animals are fully rehabilitated, they are reintroduced into their natural habitats in protected areas within Costa Rica, primarily in the Parque Nacional Juan Castro Blanco to the south of the centre.

== See also ==
- List of zoos by country: Costa Rica zoos
