= El Virilla train accident =

1926 train derailment while crossing Virilla River Canyon in Costa Rica

Coordinates: 9°57′58″N 84°05′25″W

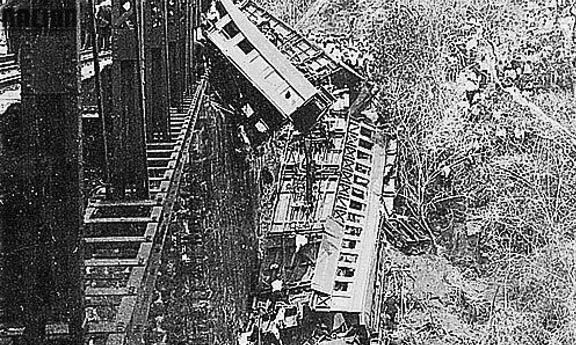
- Part of the train after falling

Details
- Date: March 14, 1926
- Location: Virilla River Canyon
- Country: Costa Rica
- Incident type: Derailment
- Cause: Overloaded train / excessive speed

Statistics
- Trains: 1
- Deaths: 385
- Injured: 93

The El Virilla train accident occurred in Costa Rica on 14 March 1926, when an overcrowded train carrying mostly farmers and laborers derailed while crossing a bridge across the Virilla River Canyon, killing 385 and injuring 93.

The train was a special service booked on a Sunday for a religious pilgrimage from Alajuela and Heredia to Cartago where most intended to visit the stone figurine of the La Negrita at the Basílica de Nuestra Señora de Los Ángeles, which supposedly has great healing powers. The pilgrimage was arranged by Professor Francisco Gomez Alizago, to raise money for a home for the elderly. The tickets were inscribed "For the benefit of the elderly of Cartago". A six-carriage train was arranged for the trip but proved grossly inadequate as the offer proved to be popular and was greatly over subscribed; no limit being placed on the sale of tickets with over a thousand being sold.

At 7 am, three carriages arrived at Alajuela and left 30 minutes later. Further stops were made and three more carriages were added at Heredia. Despite this many people were unable to board the train, and it even skipped a later stop as it was too crowded to allow any more on. At 8:20 the train began to cross the bridge which lay on a left-hand curve. A combination of a poorly fastened rail and the excessive weight of the train caused the last carriage to derail and pulled two further carriages from the track, one of which plunged 190 feet (58 m) to the river below, killing 385, including Professor Alizago. The rescue work continued into the evening. Several trains returned to Alajuela and Heredia with the bodies which were left at the stations for identification by friends and families. The government declared three days of national mourning; flags flew at half mast; cinemas, bars and other places of entertainment were closed.
