= List of national routes of Costa Rica =

This list of the National Road Network of Costa Rica contains every national route in Costa Rica. It is generated from the official maps from the Ministry of Public Works and Transport.

== List of national routes ==
Route	Classification	Length (km)	Provinces
Route 1	Primary	290.07	San José, Alajuela, Heredia, Guanacaste, Puntarenas
Route 2	Primary	356.45	San José, Cartago, Puntarenas
Route 3	Primary	67.27	San José, Alajuela, Heredia
Route 4	Primary	256.46	Alajuela, Heredia, Guanacaste, Limón
Route 5	Primary	8.86	San José, Heredia
Route 6	Primary	59.11	Alajuela, Guanacaste
Route 10	Primary	90.40	Cartago, Limón
Route 14	Primary	25.77	Puntarenas
Route 17	Primary	16.71	Puntarenas
Route 18	Primary	49.25	Guanacaste
Route 21	Primary	145.54	Guanacaste, Puntarenas
Route 22	Primary	4.35	San José
Route 23	Primary	12.66	Puntarenas
Route 27	Primary	76.75	San José, Alajuela, Puntarenas
Route 32	Primary	156.85	San José, Heredia, Limón
Route 34	Primary	210.67	Alajuela, Puntarenas
Route 35	Primary	92.38	Alajuela
Route 36	Primary	92.80	Limón
Route 39	Primary	14.91	San José
Route 100	Secondary	3.13	San José
Route 101	Secondary	4.27	San José
Route 102	Secondary	8.14	San José
Route 103	Secondary	3.70	Heredia
Route 104	Secondary	8.39	San José
Route 105	Secondary	13.68	San José
Route 106	Secondary	5.81	Heredia
Route 107	Secondary	22.14	Alajuela
Route 108	Secondary	5.97	San José
Route 109	Secondary	3.35	San José
Route 110	Secondary	3.46	San José
Route 111	Secondary	11.80	Alajuela, Heredia
Route 112	Secondary	11.44	Heredia
Route 113	Secondary	14.06	Heredia
Route 114	Secondary	15.82	Heredia
Route 115	Secondary	1.38	Heredia
Route 116	Secondary	14.92	Heredia
Route 117	Secondary	4.60	San José, Heredia
Route 118	Secondary	29.10	Alajuela
Route 119	Secondary	6.97	Alajuela, Heredia
Route 120	Secondary	15.10	Alajuela, Heredia
Route 121	Secondary	14.61	San José
Route 122	Secondary	8.50	Alajuela, Heredia
Route 123	Secondary	11.47	Alajuela, Heredia
Route 124	Secondary	13.43	Alajuela
Route 125	Secondary	10.66	Alajuela
Route 126	Secondary	73.50	Alajuela, Heredia
Route 127	Secondary	5.07	Heredia
Route 128	Secondary	5.23	Heredia
Route 129	Secondary	5.13	Heredia
Route 130	Secondary	17.29	Alajuela
Route 131	Secondary	20.12	Alajuela, Puntarenas
Route 132	Secondary	10.15	Puntarenas
Route 133	Secondary	4.86	Guanacaste
Route 134	Secondary	3.82	Alajuela
Route 135	Secondary	21.92	Alajuela
Route 136	Secondary	28.62	San José, Alajuela
Route 137	Secondary	41.41	San José, Alajuela
Route 138	Secondary	42.98	Alajuela
Route 139	Secondary	21.66	Alajuela
Route 140	Secondary	38.05	Alajuela
Route 141	Secondary	86.71	Alajuela
Route 142	Secondary	105.68	Alajuela, Guanacaste
Route 143	Secondary	20.14	Alajuela, Guanacaste
Route 144	Secondary	7.29	Puntarenas
Route 145	Secondary	47.15	Guanacaste
Route 146	Secondary	14.99	Alajuela
Route 147	Secondary	5.18	San José, Alajuela
Route 148	Secondary	11.10	Alajuela
Route 149	Secondary	2.58	Limón
Route 150	Secondary	61.95	Guanacaste
Route 151	Secondary	14.64	Guanacaste
Route 152	Secondary	18.52	Guanacaste
Route 153	Secondary	1.67	Alajuela
Route 154	Secondary	9.17	Alajuela
Route 155	Secondary	32.77	Guanacaste
Route 156	Secondary	0.64	Alajuela
Route 157	Secondary	8.93	Guanacaste
Route 158	Secondary	39.22	Guanacaste
Route 159	Secondary	10.91	Guanacaste
Route 160	Secondary	229.04	Guanacaste, Puntarenas
Route 161	Secondary	5.20	Guanacaste
Route 163	Secondary	35.67	Guanacaste, Puntarenas
Route 164	Secondary	65.95	Alajuela, Guanacaste
Route 165	Secondary	13.88	Guanacaste
Route 167	Secondary	4.84	San José
Route 168	Secondary	4.00	Puntarenas
Route 169	Secondary	5.71	Alajuela
Route 170	Secondary	22.88	Alajuela, Guanacaste
Route 171	Secondary	3.89	Heredia
Route 174	Secondary	1.13	San José
Route 175	Secondary	2.29	San José
Route 176	Secondary	2.33	San José
Route 177	Secondary	5.10	San José
Route 180	Secondary	11.11	Guanacaste
Route 200	Secondary	1.41	San José
Route 201	Secondary	1.55	San José
Route 202	Secondary	13.43	San José, Cartago
Route 203	Secondary	3.62	San José
Route 204	Secondary	3.09	San José
Route 205	Secondary	6.72	San José
Route 206	Secondary	10.79	San José
Route 207	Secondary	1.87	San José
Route 209	Secondary	46.90	San José
Route 210	Secondary	4.00	San José
Route 211	Secondary	3.06	San José
Route 212	Secondary	4.71	San José
Route 213	Secondary	3.42	San José
Route 214	Secondary	6.86	San José
Route 215	Secondary	6.64	San José
Route 216	Secondary	13.25	San José
Route 217	Secondary	7.46	San José
Route 218	Secondary	32.78	San José, Cartago
Route 219	Secondary	32.74	Cartago
Route 220	Secondary	7.39	San José, Heredia
Route 221	Secondary	7.96	San José, Cartago
Route 222	Secondary	26.89	San José, Cartago
Route 223	Secondary	15.29	Puntarenas
Route 224	Secondary	31.58	Cartago
Route 225	Secondary	31.74	Cartago
Route 226	Secondary	40.74	San José
Route 227	Secondary	36.45	Alajuela
Route 228	Secondary	26.58	Cartago
Route 229	Secondary	20.70	Heredia
Route 230	Secondary	39.58	Cartago
Route 231	Secondary	4.75	Cartago
Route 232	Secondary	5.80	Cartago
Route 233	Secondary	2.45	Cartago
Route 234	Secondary	9.70	Limón
Route 235	Secondary	7.10	Puntarenas
Route 236	Secondary	4.13	Cartago
Route 237	Secondary	78.98	Puntarenas
Route 238	Secondary	50.99	Puntarenas
Route 239	Secondary	87.50	San José, Puntarenas
Route 240	Secondary	10.50	Limón
Route 241	Secondary	12.36	Limón
Route 242	Secondary	18.25	San José
Route 243	Secondary	33.42	San José, Puntarenas
Route 244	Secondary	21.66	San José
Route 245	Secondary	117.72	Puntarenas
Route 246	Secondary	6.43	Puntarenas
Route 247	Secondary	67.94	Limón
Route 248	Secondary	39.88	Limón
Route 249	Secondary	46.65	Limón
Route 250	Secondary	62.47	Alajuela
Route 251	Secondary	6.91	San José, Cartago
Route 252	Secondary	1.56	San José
Route 253	Secondary	19.66	Guanacaste
Route 254	Secondary	8.38	Guanacaste
Route 255	Secondary	1.78	Guanacaste
Route 256	Secondary	18.38	Limón
Route 257	Secondary	1.94	Limón
Route 301	Tertiary	53.71	San José, Puntarenas
Route 303	Tertiary	16.40	San José
Route 304	Tertiary	15.12	San José, Cartago
Route 306	Tertiary	3.61	San José
Route 307	Tertiary	11.52	San José
Route 308	Tertiary	7.19	San José, Heredia
Route 309	Tertiary	6.88	San José
Route 310	Tertiary	10.05	San José
Route 311	Tertiary	3.18	San José
Route 312	Tertiary	1.25	San José
Route 313	Tertiary	37.70	San José
Route 314	Tertiary	9.77	San José
Route 315	Tertiary	14.96	San José
Route 316	Tertiary	8.91	San José
Route 317	Tertiary	9.48	San José
Route 318	Tertiary	18.22	San José, Puntarenas
Route 319	Tertiary	61.31	San José
Route 320	Tertiary	17.83	San José, Puntarenas
Route 321	Tertiary	3.13	San José
Route 322	Tertiary	17.94	San José
Route 323	Tertiary	11.35	San José
Route 324	Tertiary	26.08	San José
Route 325	Tertiary	10.19	San José
Route 326	Tertiary	18.57	San José
Route 327	Tertiary	10.11	San José
Route 328	Tertiary	23.16	San José
Route 329	Tertiary	10.26	San José
Route 330	Tertiary	9.71	San José
Route 331	Tertiary	8.24	San José
Route 332	Tertiary	16.34	San José
Route 333	Tertiary	12.32	San José
Route 334	Tertiary	14.67	San José
Route 335	Tertiary	17.66	San José
Route 336	Tertiary	10.99	San José
Route 401	Tertiary	5.44	Cartago
Route 402	Tertiary	21.06	Cartago
Route 403	Tertiary	3.37	Cartago
Route 404	Tertiary	8.79	Cartago
Route 405	Tertiary	14.21	Cartago
Route 406	Tertiary	10.86	San José, Cartago
Route 407	Tertiary	6.85	Cartago
Route 408	Tertiary	28.78	Cartago
Route 409	Tertiary	8.67	San José, Cartago
Route 411	Tertiary	12.64	Cartago
Route 413	Tertiary	20.80	Cartago
Route 414	Tertiary	29.34	Cartago
Route 415	Tertiary	49.20	Cartago, Limón
Route 416	Tertiary	1.23	Cartago
Route 417	Tertiary	16.83	Cartago
Route 502	Tertiary	5.97	Heredia
Route 503	Tertiary	1.50	Heredia
Route 504	Tertiary	3.02	Heredia
Route 505	Tertiary	19.21	Heredia
Route 506	Tertiary	5.93	Heredia
Route 507	Tertiary	63.95	Heredia
Route 510	Tertiary	21.24	Heredia
Route 601	Tertiary	38.33	Guanacaste, Puntarenas
Route 602	Tertiary	13.09	Guanacaste, Puntarenas
Route 603	Tertiary	10.16	Puntarenas
Route 604	Tertiary	18.00	Puntarenas
Route 605	Tertiary	14.89	Puntarenas
Route 606	Tertiary	52.88	Guanacaste, Puntarenas
Route 607	Tertiary	8.71	Puntarenas
Route 608	Tertiary	28.97	Puntarenas
Route 609	Tertiary	13.87	Puntarenas
Route 610	Tertiary	21.24	Puntarenas
Route 611	Tertiary	18.99	Puntarenas
Route 612	Tertiary	31.47	Puntarenas
Route 613	Tertiary	30.86	Puntarenas
Route 614	Tertiary	20.94	Puntarenas
Route 615	Tertiary	11.07	Puntarenas
Route 616	Tertiary	9.71	Puntarenas
Route 617	Tertiary	11.50	Puntarenas
Route 618	Tertiary	6.34	Puntarenas
Route 619	Tertiary	11.98	Guanacaste, Puntarenas
Route 620	Tertiary	5.71	Puntarenas
Route 621	Tertiary	4.17	Puntarenas
Route 622	Tertiary	13.59	Puntarenas
Route 623	Tertiary	13.65	Guanacaste, Puntarenas
Route 624	Tertiary	6.59	Puntarenas
Route 625	Tertiary	41.00	Puntarenas
Route 700	Tertiary	3.37	Alajuela
Route 702	Tertiary	71.31	Alajuela
Route 703	Tertiary	19.01	Alajuela
Route 704	Tertiary	12.16	Alajuela
Route 705	Tertiary	13.66	Alajuela
Route 706	Tertiary	3.32	Alajuela
Route 707	Tertiary	24.64	San José, Alajuela
Route 708	Tertiary	44.50	Alajuela
Route 709	Tertiary	10.44	Alajuela
Route 710	Tertiary	4.24	Alajuela
Route 711	Tertiary	4.79	Alajuela
Route 712	Tertiary	9.00	Alajuela
Route 713	Tertiary	17.46	Alajuela
Route 714	Tertiary	5.93	Alajuela
Route 715	Tertiary	14.80	Alajuela
Route 716	Tertiary	6.07	Alajuela
Route 717	Tertiary	8.69	Alajuela
Route 718	Tertiary	5.08	Alajuela
Route 719	Tertiary	5.13	Alajuela
Route 720	Tertiary	5.96	Alajuela
Route 721	Tertiary	14.36	Alajuela
Route 722	Tertiary	6.18	Alajuela
Route 723	Tertiary	8.48	Alajuela
Route 725	Tertiary	5.30	Alajuela
Route 726	Tertiary	5.62	Alajuela
Route 727	Tertiary	4.21	Alajuela
Route 728	Tertiary	15.12	Alajuela
Route 729	Tertiary	4.14	Alajuela
Route 730	Tertiary	6.64	Alajuela
Route 731	Tertiary	12.16	Alajuela
Route 732	Tertiary	14.83	Alajuela
Route 733	Tertiary	41.48	Alajuela
Route 734	Tertiary	29.76	Alajuela, Guanacaste
Route 735	Tertiary	10.99	Alajuela
Route 737	Tertiary	13.53	Alajuela
Route 738	Tertiary	5.60	Alajuela
Route 739	Tertiary	10.40	Alajuela
Route 741	Tertiary	16.11	Alajuela
Route 742	Tertiary	51.77	Alajuela, Puntarenas
Route 744	Tertiary	13.96	Alajuela
Route 745	Tertiary	49.08	Alajuela, Heredia
Route 746	Tertiary	4.90	Alajuela
Route 747	Tertiary	7.79	Alajuela
Route 748	Tertiary	17.90	Alajuela
Route 749	Tertiary	12.04	Alajuela
Route 750	Tertiary	8.45	Alajuela
Route 751	Tertiary	26.69	Alajuela
Route 752	Tertiary	20.98	Alajuela
Route 753	Tertiary	17.78	Alajuela
Route 755	Tertiary	11.18	Alajuela, Puntarenas
Route 756	Tertiary	9.95	Alajuela, Puntarenas
Route 757	Tertiary	11.80	Alajuela
Route 760	Tertiary	21.69	Alajuela
Route 761	Tertiary	43.59	Alajuela
Route 801	Tertiary	19.95	Limón
Route 802	Tertiary	10.67	Limón
Route 803	Tertiary	10.07	Limón
Route 804	Tertiary	17.30	Limón
Route 805	Tertiary	14.23	Limón
Route 806	Tertiary	36.84	Limón
Route 807	Tertiary	3.18	Limón
Route 809	Tertiary	6.11	Limón
Route 810	Tertiary	11.29	Limón
Route 811	Tertiary	19.28	Limón
Route 812	Tertiary	22.44	Limón
Route 813	Tertiary	12.53	Limón
Route 814	Tertiary	12.11	Limón
Route 816	Tertiary	7.01	Limón
Route 817	Tertiary	29.27	Heredia, Limón
Route 901	Tertiary	23.85	Guanacaste
Route 902	Tertiary	27.22	Guanacaste
Route 903	Tertiary	29.34	Guanacaste
Route 904	Tertiary	21.68	Guanacaste
Route 905	Tertiary	13.21	Guanacaste
Route 906	Tertiary	19.86	Guanacaste
Route 907	Tertiary	13.41	Guanacaste
Route 909	Tertiary	11.60	Guanacaste
Route 910	Tertiary	9.35	Guanacaste
Route 911	Tertiary	21.82	Guanacaste
Route 912	Tertiary	12.05	Guanacaste
Route 913	Tertiary	7.49	Guanacaste
Route 914	Tertiary	12.38	Guanacaste
Route 915	Tertiary	16.49	Guanacaste
Route 917	Tertiary	40.49	Alajuela, Guanacaste
Route 918	Tertiary	22.37	Guanacaste
Route 920	Tertiary	36.75	Guanacaste
Route 921	Tertiary	12.42	Guanacaste
Route 922	Tertiary	20.08	Guanacaste
Route 923	Tertiary	14.70	Guanacaste
Route 925	Tertiary	32.89	Guanacaste
Route 926	Tertiary	41.80	Guanacaste
Route 927	Tertiary	22.21	Guanacaste
Route 928	Tertiary	8.02	Guanacaste
Route 929	Tertiary	13.41	Guanacaste
Route 930	Tertiary	8.65	Guanacaste
Route 931	Tertiary	15.33	Guanacaste
Route 933	Tertiary	6.13	Guanacaste
Route 934	Tertiary	8.64	Guanacaste
Route 935	Tertiary	16.29	Guanacaste
Route 936	Tertiary	30.82	Alajuela, Guanacaste
Route 937	Tertiary	8.76	Guanacaste
Route 938	Tertiary	10.59	Guanacaste
Route 939	Tertiary	6.65	Guanacaste
