= National Route 2 (Costa Rica) =

Highway in Costa Rica

National Primary Route 2
- Ruta nacional primaria 2
- Carretera Interamericana Sur (South Interamerican Road); Autopista Florencio del Castillo (Florencio del Castillo Highway) segment
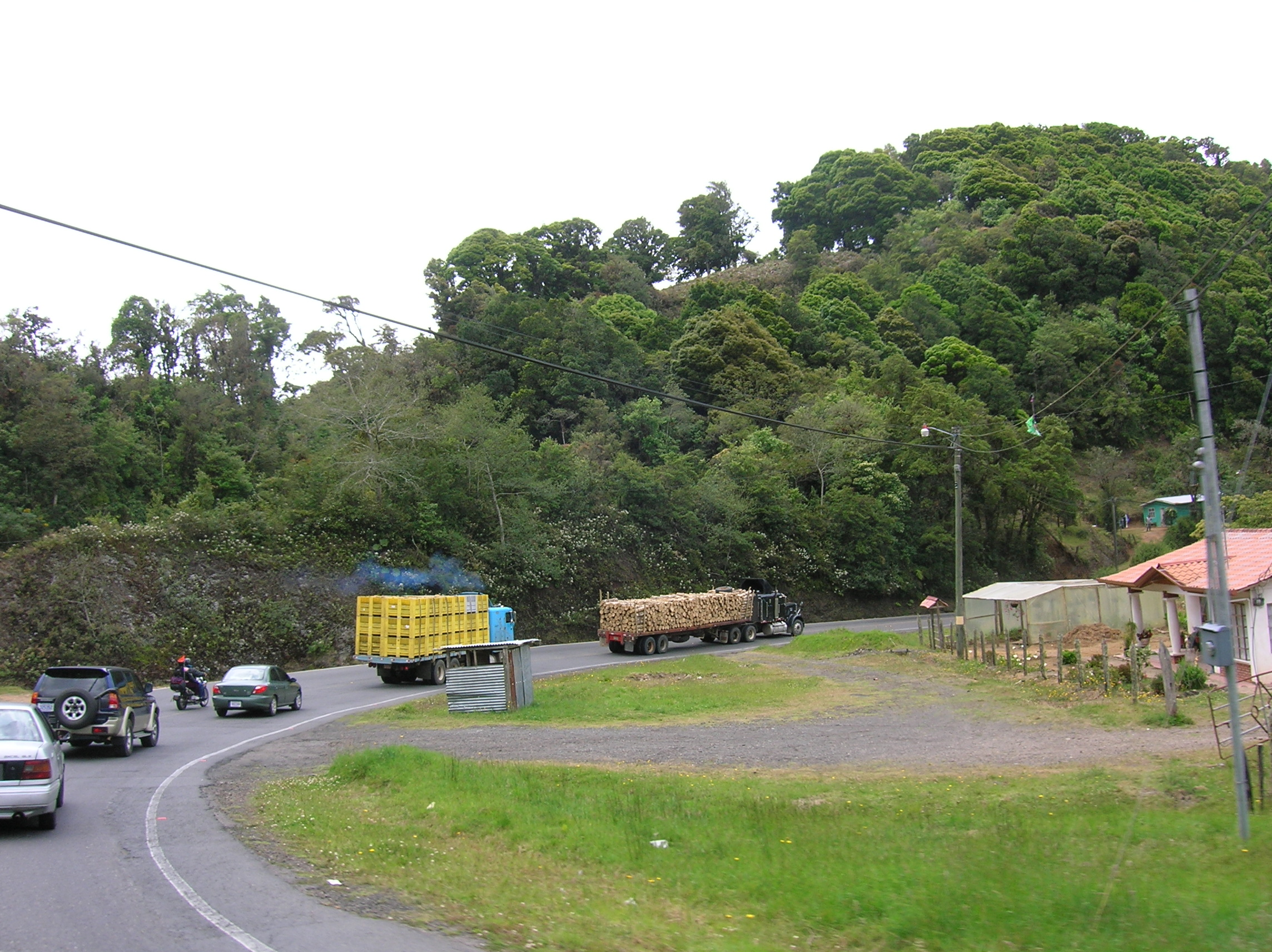
- Carretera Interamericana Sur, Costa Rica. March 2008.

Route information
- Maintained by Ministry of Public Works and Transport

Major junctions
- West end: Route 1
- Route 39 (Hispanidad roundabout); Route 215 (La Galera); Route 251 (La Galera); Route 252 (La Galera); Route 219 (Taras, Cartago); Route 10 (Cartago); Route 228 (Tejar); Route 406 (To Cristóbal Norte); Route 222 (To Frailes); Route 226 (To Santa María, Dota); Route 315 (To Copey, Dota); Route 243 (To Dominical); Route 242 (To Chirripó); Route 244 (Pejibaye); Route 246 (Buenos Aires); Route 237 (To San Vito de Coto Brús at Paso Real); Route 34 (Palmar Norte); Route 245 (To Puerto Jiménez); Route 14 (Golfito); Route 237 (To San Vito de Coto Brús, at Ciudad Neily)
- East end: Panama Route 1

Location
- Country: Costa Rica
- Provinces: San José, Cartago, Puntarenas

Highway system
- National Road Network of Costa Rica
← Route 1	→ Route 3

National Primary Route 2, formally known as Carretera Interamericana Sur (South Interamerican Road), is the southern segment of the Pan-American Highway (locally in Central America known as the Inter-American Highway) that traverses Costa Rica.

== Description ==
The road begins in the casco central (downtown, city center) districts of San José canton, just where Route 1 ends, at the east side of the La Sabana Metropolitan Park. The segment between Curridabat and Cartago canton is named Autopista Florencio del Castillo, further south it is just known as Interamericana Sur.

In San José province the route covers San José canton (Hospital and Catedral districts), Montes de Oca canton (San Pedro district), Dota canton (Copey district), Curridabat canton (Curridabat and Sánchez districts), and Pérez Zeledón canton (San Isidro de El General, Daniel Flores, Rivas, San Pedro, Cajón, and Páramo districts).

In Cartago province the route covers Cartago canton (San Nicolás, Aguacaliente o San Francisco, Guadalupe o Arenilla, Dulce Nombre districts), Paraíso canton (Orosi district), La Unión canton (Tres Ríos, San Diego, San Juan, and San Rafael districts), and El Guarco canton (Tejar and San Isidro districts).

In Puntarenas province the route covers Buenos Aires canton (Buenos Aires, Volcan, Potrero Grande, Boruca, and Brunka districts), Osa canton (Palmar and Piedras Blancas districts), and Golfito canton (Guaycará district), Corredores canton (Corredor and Canoas districts).

=== Route and access ===
It traverses the Cerro de la Muerte (Death Mountain) and at 3,335 meters (10,942 feet), it is the highest point in the Pan-American Highway.

It then goes south and downward from Cerro de la Muerte to San Isidro de El General district, Buenos Aires town, Térraba river, Palmar Norte town, Palmar Sur town, and Paso Canoas border town, which borders with Panamá.

Some places of interest along the route are Los Quetzales National Park, the páramo ecosystem of Cerro de la Muerte, and Finca 6 archaeological park displaying the stone spheres of Costa Rica.

=== Toll booths ===
There is a toll booth in Tres Ríos district, La Unión canton.

== History ==
Before the development of the road, crossing the mortally and aptly named Cerro de la Muerte took four to five days on foot, and many people died due to the low temperatures and lack of sanitary infrastructure.

On August 5, 1908, the scholar Pedro Pérez Zeledón proposed the creation of three rest stops, named “División”, “La Muerte”, and “Ojo de Agua”, which were built between 1910 and 1912, located at around ten to two hours on foot of each other.

The design and construction of the segment between Cartago and Paso Canoas from 1930 until 1959 was by the Army Engineers, Public Roads Administration and Bureau of Public Roads (Both now the Federal Highway Administration) of the United States of America. On February 10, 1942, a memorandum detailed the corresponding route to Route 2 as Panamá-Cañas Gordas-Buenos Aires-San Isidro de El General-Empalme-Cartago, later Cerro de la Muerte was selected and finally in 1949 the segment of Cañas Gordas-Buenos Aires was removed in favor of Buenos Aires-Palmar Sur-Paso Canoas. Works started in 1942 and by 1946 it was possible to use the route, the Route 2 segment was completely open by 1963 and it was fully paved with asphalt on 1974.

What is now known as Route 243 between San Isidro de El General and Dominical in the pacific coast was also created at the time as an access road for the construction materials.

President Teodoro Picado Michalski joined the US Army survey team in the 1940s to visit Cerro de la Muerte while the road designs were taking place.

=== New developments ===
==== Plaza del Sol roundabout ====
Will be constructed a hundred meters west of Plaza del Sol, to remove the left turn to Lourdes in Montes de Oca.

==== La Galera tunnel ====
There are plans to build a tunnel on the western initial segment of Autopista Florencio del Castillo, near the border between Curridabat canton of San José and Unión canton of Cartago. The tunnel will allow a more fluid access to San José areas coming from Cartago.

==== Cartago gateway enhancements ====
From Route 2, to access the central district of Cartago (canton), it is possible to use either Route 219 at Taras or Route 10 which is the main route across the Cartago canton. In 2019 a new project by private initiative proposed a series of enhancements to enhance the junction between Route 2 and Route 10, with a series of new roundabouts and elevated highways.

==== New paving ====
From 2019 onward, a replacement of the asphalt is being developed.

=== Natural disasters ===
Landslides are common in this route. It was severely damaged near Cerro de la Muerte in November 2020 due to the indirect effects of Hurricane Eta.
