= La Amistad District =

District in Pérez Zeledón canton, San José province, Costa Rica

La Amistad
- District
- Interactive map of La Amistad
- La Amistad district location in Costa Rica
- Coordinates: 9.2005523°N 83.5396829°W
- Country: Costa Rica
- Province: San José
- Canton: Pérez Zeledón
- Creation: 5 December 2014

Area
  - Total: 76.11 km^{2} (29.39 sq mi)
- Elevation: 780 m (2,560 ft)
- Time zone: UTC−06:00
- Postal code: 11912

La Amistad is a district of the Pérez Zeledón canton, in the San José province of Costa Rica.

== History ==
La Amistad was created on 5 December 2014 by cuerdo Ejecutivo N° 67-2014-MGP. Segregated from districts Platanares and Pejibaye.

== Geography ==
La Amistad has an area of 76.11 km^{2} and an elevation of 780 metres.

== Demographics ==
Historical population
Census	Pop.	±% p.a.
2022	2,984	—
Source: Instituto Nacional de Estadística y Censos; Centro Centroamericano de Población

For the 2011 census, La Amistad had not been created, therefore census data is not available, as the current inhabitants were part of Platanares and Pejibaye districts.

== Transportation ==
=== Road transportation ===
The district is covered by the following road routes:

- National Route 332
