= National Route 243 (Costa Rica) =

National Road Route in Costa Rica

National Secondary Route 243
- Ruta nacional secundaria 243

Route information
- Maintained by Ministry of Public Works and Transport
- Length: 33.425 km (20.769 mi)

Major junctions
- Northeast end: Route 2
- Southwest end: Route 34

Location
- Country: Costa Rica
- Provinces: San José, Puntarenas

Highway system
- National Road Network of Costa Rica
← Route 242	→ Route 244

National Secondary Route 243, or just Route 243 (Spanish: Ruta Nacional Secundaria 243, or Ruta 243) is a National Road Route of Costa Rica, located in the San José, Puntarenas provinces. It connects Route 2 and Route 34.

== Description ==
The road starts at the northeast in San Isidro de El General district and continues southwest to the Dominical beach area in the Pacific coast.

In San José province the route covers Pérez Zeledón canton (San Isidro de El General and Barú districts).

In Puntarenas province the route covers Quepos canton (Savegre district).

== History ==
This road was created around the time of the development of the Pan-American Highway as an access road for the transportation of construction goods and equipment.
