= Juan Gabriel Calderón =

Costa Rican football referee (born 1987)

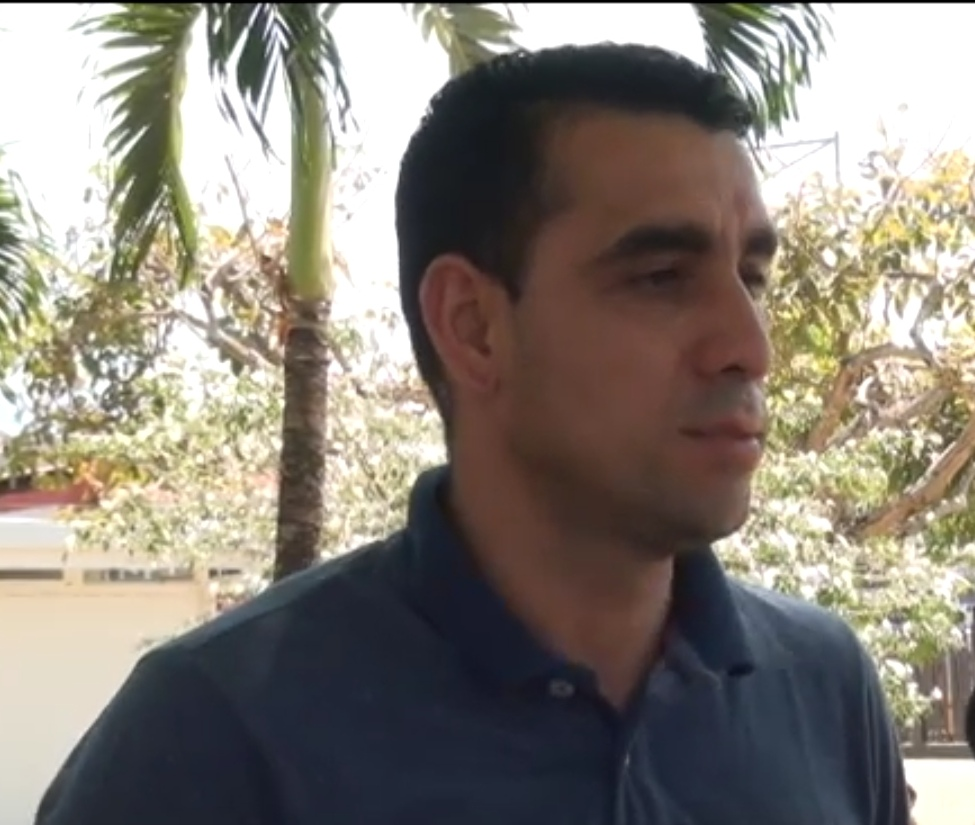
- Calderón in 2019
- Born: Juan Gabriel Calderón Pérez; 11 April 1987 (age 39); La Amistad District, Costa Rica

Domestic
Years	League	Role
2013–present	Liga FPD	Referee

International
Years	League	Role
2017–present	FIFA listed	Referee

Juan Gabriel Calderón Pérez (born 11 April 1987) is a Costa Rican football referee who has been on the FIFA International Referees List since 2017.

== Career ==
Calderón was born in La Amistad District, Pérez Zeledón, Costa Rica, the son of coffee production workers. He began his experiences in refereeing by accompanying his father to see matches in the neighbourhood. Calderón liked the idea of becoming a referee and began overseeing amateur games in the neighbourhood in the early 2000s, when he was 14 years old. In 2006, Calderón became a league referee and joined the Commission of Referees in 2010.

Calderón's professional career started as an assistant referee in Segunda División. In 2013, he refereed his first match as a central official in the Liga FPD and earned his FIFA badge in 2017. Calderón has taken part in five editions of the CONCACAF Gold Cup, the latest being the edition of 2025 in Canada and the US, where he oversaw a semifinal game between Mexico and Honduras. In 2023, Calderón was selected for the FIFA U-20 World Cup in Argentina, where he led his most advanced game in the tournament in a quarter-final match between Israel U21 and Brazil U20 in San Juan.

Other international tournaments for Calderón include the Leagues Cup, friendly matches, and CONCACAF qualification games for the 2022 FIFA World Cup. In April 2026, Calderón was chosen as the referee of the Costa Rican Cup final between Sporting F.C. and Deportivo Saprissa in the Estadio Edgardo Baltodano Briceño.

On 9 April 2026, Calderón was selected by FIFA to be a central referee at the 2026 FIFA World Cup, becoming the first Costa Rican central referee at a World Cup since 2002, when William Mattus participated in the 2002 FIFA World Cup in South Korea and Japan.
