= List of highways numbered 321 =

The following highways are numbered 321:

== Canada ==
- Nova Scotia Route 321
- Saskatchewan Highway 321

== China ==
- China National Highway 321

== Costa Rica ==
- National Route 321

== Cuba ==
- Cuatro Caminos–Arroyo de Agua Road (1–321)
- Las Minas–Comunidad Pedro Pi Road (2–321)
- Santa Clara–Caibarién Road (4–321)

== Japan ==
- Japan National Route 321

== United States ==
- U.S. Highway 321
- Arkansas Highway 321
  - Arkansas Highway 321 Spur
- Florida State Road 321
- Georgia State Route 321 (former)
- Kentucky Route 321
- Louisiana Highway 321
- Mississippi Highway 321
- Nevada State Route 321
- New Mexico State Road 321
- New York:
  - New York State Route 321
  - County Route 321 (Erie County, New York)
- North Carolina Highway 321 (former)
- Ohio State Route 321
- Pennsylvania Route 321
- Puerto Rico Highway 321
- Tennessee State Route 321
- Texas:
  - Texas State Highway 321
  - Texas State Highway Loop 321
  - Farm to Market Road 321
- Virginia State Route 321
  - Virginia State Route 321 (former)
- Wyoming Highway 321

Preceded by 320	Lists of highways 321	Succeeded by 322
