= Barú District, Pérez Zeledón =

District in Pérez Zeledón canton, San José province, Costa Rica

Barú
- District
- Interactive map of Barú
- Barú district location in Costa Rica
- Coordinates: 9.3202634°N 83.8275555°W
- Country: Costa Rica
- Province: San José
- Canton: Pérez Zeledón
- Creation: 3 November 1983

Area
  - Total: 191.42 km^{2} (73.91 sq mi)
- Elevation: 430 m (1,410 ft)

Population (2011)
  - Total: 2,393
  - Density: 12.50/km^{2} (32.38/sq mi)
- Time zone: UTC−06:00
- Postal code: 11909

Barú is a district of the Pérez Zeledón canton, in the San José province of Costa Rica.

== History ==
Barú was created on 3 November 1983 by Acuerdo Ejecutivo 232. It was segregated from San Isidro de El General.

== Geography ==
Barú has an area of 191.42 km^{2} and an elevation of 430 metres.

== Demographics ==
Historical population
Census	Pop.	±% p.a.
1984	2,829	—
2000	2,335	−1.19%
2011	2,393	+0.22%
2022	2,897	+1.75%
Source: Instituto Nacional de Estadística y Censos; Centro Centroamericano de Población

For the 2011 census, Barú had a population of 2,393 inhabitants.

== Transportation ==
=== Road transportation ===
The district is covered by the following road routes:

- National Route 243
