= Cajón District =

District in Pérez Zeledón canton, San José province, Costa Rica

Cajón
- District
- Interactive map of Cajón
- Cajón district location in Costa Rica
- Coordinates: 9.3319297°N 83.5740319°W
- Country: Costa Rica
- Province: San José
- Canton: Pérez Zeledón
- Creation: 3 March 1970

Area
  - Total: 118.86 km^{2} (45.89 sq mi)
- Elevation: 687 m (2,254 ft)

Population (2011)
  - Total: 8,542
  - Density: 71.87/km^{2} (186.1/sq mi)
- Time zone: UTC−06:00
- Postal code: 11908

Cajón is a district of the Pérez Zeledón canton, in the San José province of Costa Rica.

== History ==
Cajón was created on 3 March 1970 by Decreto Ejecutivo 14. Segregated from San Pedro.

== Geography ==
Cajón has an area of 118.86 km^{2} and an elevation of 687 metres.

== Demographics ==
Historical population
Census	Pop.	±% p.a.
1973	3,529	—
1984	4,250	+1.70%
2000	7,467	+3.59%
2011	8,542	+1.23%
2022	11,026	+2.35%
Source: Instituto Nacional de Estadística y Censos; Centro Centroamericano de Población

For the 2011 census, Cajón had a population of 8,542 inhabitants.

== Transportation ==
=== Road transportation ===
The district is covered by the following road routes:

- National Route 2
- National Route 322
- National Route 326
