= List of highways numbered 330 =

The following highways are numbered 330:

== Canada ==
- Manitoba Provincial Road 330
- New Brunswick Route 330
- Newfoundland and Labrador Route 330
- Nova Scotia Route 330
- Prince Edward Island Route 330

== China ==
- China National Highway 330

== Costa Rica ==
- National Route 330

== India ==
- National Highway 330 (India)

== Japan ==
- Japan National Route 330

== United States ==
- U.S. Route 330 (former)
- Arkansas Highway 330
- California State Route 330
- Colorado State Highway 330
- Georgia State Route 330
- Indiana State Road 330 (former)
- Iowa Highway 330
- Kentucky Route 330
- Louisiana Highway 330
- Maryland Route 330
- Minnesota State Highway 330
- Mississippi Highway 330
- Montana Secondary Highway 330
- New Mexico State Road 330
- New York:
  - New York State Route 330 (former)
  - County Route 330 (Erie County, New York)
- Ohio State Route 330
- Puerto Rico Highway 330
- Tennessee State Route 330
- Texas:
  - Texas State Highway 330 (former)
  - Texas State Highway Spur 330
  - Farm to Market Road 330
- Virginia State Route 330
  - Virginia State Route 330 (former)
- Wyoming Highway 330

Preceded by 329	Lists of highways 330	Succeeded by 331
