= List of highways numbered 326 =

Route 326, or Highway 326, may refer to:

== Canada ==
- Nova Scotia Route 326

== China ==
- China National Highway 326

== Costa Rica ==
- National Route 326

== Japan ==
- Japan National Route 326

== United States ==
- Interstate 326 (former)
- Arkansas Highway 326
- Florida:
  - Florida State Road 326
  - County Road 326 (Levy County, Florida)
  - County Road 326 (Marion County, Florida)
- Georgia State Route 326
- Kentucky Route 326
- Louisiana Highway 326
- Maryland Route 326
- Minnesota State Highway 326 (former)
- Montana Secondary Highway 326
  - Montana Secondary Highway 326 (former)
- New York State Route 326
- Ohio State Route 326
- Pennsylvania Route 326
- Puerto Rico Highway 326
- Tennessee State Route 326
- Texas:
  - Texas State Highway 326
  - Texas State Highway Spur 326
  - Farm to Market Road 326
- Virginia State Route 326

Preceded by 325	Lists of highways 326	Succeeded by 327
