= List of highways numbered 325 =

The following highways are numbered 325:

== Canada ==
- Nova Scotia Route 325
- Quebec Route 325

== China ==
- China National Highway 325

== Costa Rica ==
- National Route 325

== Finland ==
- National Highway 325 (Finland)

== India ==
- National Highway 325 (India)

== Japan ==
- Japan National Route 325

== United States ==
- Arkansas Highway 325
- Colorado State Highway 325
- Florida State Road 325 (former)
- Georgia State Route 325
- Iowa Highway 325 (former)
- Louisiana Highway 325 (former)
- Kentucky Route 325
- Montana Secondary Highway 325
- New Mexico State Road 325
- New York:
  - New York State Route 325
  - County Route 325 (Erie County, New York)
- Ohio State Route 325
- Oklahoma State Highway 325
- Pennsylvania Route 325
- Puerto Rico Highway 325
- Tennessee State Route 325
- Texas:
  - Texas State Highway 325 (former)
  - Texas State Highway Spur 325
  - Farm to Market Road 325
- Virginia State Route 325

Preceded by 324	Lists of highways 325	Succeeded by 326
