= National Route 334 (Costa Rica) =

National Road Route in Costa Rica

National Tertiary Route 334
- Ruta nacional terciaria 334

Route information
- Maintained by Ministry of Public Works and Transport
- Length: 14.670 km (9.116 mi)

Location
- Country: Costa Rica
- Provinces: San José

Highway system
- National Road Network of Costa Rica
← Route 333	→ Route 335

National Tertiary Route 334, or just Route 334 (Spanish: Ruta Nacional Terciaria 334, or Ruta 334) is a National Road Route of Costa Rica, located in the San José province.

== Description ==
In San José province the route covers Pérez Zeledón canton (San Isidro de El General, Daniel Flores districts).
