= National Route 335 (Costa Rica) =

National Road Route in Costa Rica

National Tertiary Route 335
- Ruta nacional terciaria 335

Route information
- Maintained by Ministry of Public Works and Transport
- Length: 17.665 km (10.977 mi)

Location
- Country: Costa Rica
- Provinces: San José

Highway system
- National Road Network of Costa Rica
← Route 334	→ Route 336

National Tertiary Route 335, or just Route 335 (Spanish: Ruta Nacional Terciaria 335, or Ruta 335) is a National Road Route of Costa Rica, located in the San José province.

== Description ==
In San José province the route covers Pérez Zeledón canton (Páramo district).
