= National Route 333 (Costa Rica) =

National Road Route in Costa Rica

National Tertiary Route 333
- Ruta nacional terciaria 333

Route information
- Maintained by Ministry of Public Works and Transport
- Length: 12.315 km (7.652 mi)

Location
- Country: Costa Rica
- Provinces: San José

Highway system
- National Road Network of Costa Rica
← Route 332	→ Route 334

National Tertiary Route 333, or just Route 333 (Spanish: Ruta Nacional Terciaria 333, or Ruta 333) is a National Road Route of Costa Rica, located in the San José province.

== Description ==
In San José province the route covers Pérez Zeledón canton (San Pedro district).
