= List of highways numbered 324 =

The following highways are numbered 324:

== Brazil ==
- BR-324

== Canada ==
- Nova Scotia Route 324
- Saskatchewan Highway 324

== China ==
- China National Highway 324

== Costa Rica ==
- National Route 324

== Japan ==
- Japan National Route 324

== United States ==
- Arkansas Highway 324
- Georgia State Route 324
- Louisiana Highway 324
- Maryland Route 324 (unsigned)
- Minnesota State Highway 324 (former)
- New Jersey Route 324
- New York:
  - New York State Route 324
  - County Route 324 (Erie County, New York)
- Ohio State Route 324
- Pennsylvania Route 324
- Puerto Rico Highway 324
- South Carolina Highway 324
- South Dakota Highway 324
- Texas State Highway 324 (former)
- Virginia State Route 324
  - Virginia State Route 324 (former)
- Montana Highway 324

Preceded by 323	Lists of highways 324	Succeeded by 325
