= List of highways numbered 328 =

The following highways are numbered 328:

== Australia ==
- Cameron Drive (No through road)

== Canada ==
- Nova Scotia Route 328

== China ==
- China National Highway 328

== Costa Rica ==
- National Route 328

== Japan ==
- Japan National Route 328

== United States ==
- Arkansas Highway 328
- Florida:
  - Florida State Road 328 (former)
  - County Road 328 (Marion County, Florida)
- Georgia State Route 328
- Kentucky Route 328
- Louisiana Highway 328
- Maryland Route 328
- Mississippi Highway 328
- Montana Secondary Highway 328
- New York:
  - New York State Route 328
    - New York State Route 328A (former)
  - County Route 328 (Erie County, New York)
- Ohio State Route 328
- Pennsylvania Route 328
- Puerto Rico Highway 328
- Tennessee State Route 328
- Texas:
  - Texas State Highway 328 (former)
  - Texas State Highway Loop 328
  - Farm to Market Road 328
- Virginia State Route 328
  - Virginia State Route 328 (former)

Preceded by 327	Lists of highways 328	Succeeded by 329
