= List of highways numbered 329 =

The following highways are numbered 329:

== Australia ==
- Holmes Road

== Canada ==
- Nova Scotia Route 329
- Quebec Route 329

== China ==
- China National Highway 329

== Costa Rica ==
- National Route 329

== Japan ==
- Japan National Route 329

== United Kingdom ==
- A329 road, Wentworth, Virginia Water to Thame

== United States ==
- Arkansas Highway 329
- Florida State Road 329
- Georgia State Route 329
- Indiana State Road 329 (former)
- Kentucky Route 329
  - Kentucky Route 329 Bypass
- Louisiana Highway 329
- Maryland Route 329
- Minnesota State Highway 329
- New Mexico State Road 329
- New York:
  - New York State Route 329
  - County Route 329 (Erie County, New York)
- Ohio State Route 329
- Pennsylvania Route 329
- Puerto Rico Highway 329
- South Carolina Highway 329
- Tennessee State Route 329
- Texas:
  - Texas State Highway 329
  - Farm to Market Road 329
- Virginia State Route 329

Preceded by 328	Lists of highways 329	Succeeded by 330
