= List of highways numbered 327 =

The following highways are numbered 327:

== Canada ==
- Manitoba Provincial Road 327
- Nova Scotia Route 327
- Quebec Route 327

== China ==
- China National Highway 327

== Costa Rica ==
- National Route 327

== India ==
- National Highway 327 (India)

== Japan ==
- Japan National Route 327

== United States ==
- Arkansas Highway 327
- Florida State Road 327
- Georgia State Route 327
- Indiana State Road 327
- Iowa Highway 327 (former)
- Kentucky Route 327
- Louisiana Highway 327
- Maryland Route 327
- Montana Secondary Route 327
- New Mexico State Road 327
- New York:
  - New York State Route 327
  - County Route 327 (Erie County, New York)
- Ohio State Route 327
- Pennsylvania Route 327 (former)
- Puerto Rico Highway 327
- South Carolina Highway 327
- Tennessee State Route 327
- Texas:
  - Texas State Highway 327
  - Texas State Highway Spur 327
  - Farm to Market Road 327
- Virginia State Route 327

Preceded by 326	Lists of highways 327	Succeeded by 328
