= List of highways numbered 322 =

The following highways are numbered 322:

== Canada ==
- Nova Scotia Route 322
- Saskatchewan Highway 322

== China ==
- China National Highway 322

== Costa Rica ==
- National Route 322

== India ==
- National Highway 322 (India)

== Japan ==
- Japan National Route 322

== United States ==
- U.S. Route 322
- Arkansas Highway 322
- Connecticut Route 322
- County Road 322 (Levy County, Florida)
- Georgia State Route 322 (former)
- Iowa Highway 322 (former)
- Kentucky Route 322
- Louisiana Highway 322
- Maryland Route 322
- Minnesota State Highway 322 (former)
- Mississippi Highway 322
- Montana Secondary Highway 322
- Nevada State Route 322
- New Mexico State Road 322
- New York:
  - New York State Route 322
  - County Route 322 (Erie County, New York)
- South Carolina Highway 322
- Tennessee State Route 322
- Texas:
  - Texas State Highway 322
  - Texas State Highway Loop 322
  - Farm to Market Road 322
- Virginia State Route 322
  - Virginia State Route 322 (former)
- Wyoming Highway 322 (former)

Other areas:

- Puerto Rico Highway 322
- U.S. Virgin Islands Highway 322

Preceded by 321	Lists of highways 322	Succeeded by 323
