= List of highways numbered 331 =

Route 331, or Highway 331, may refer to:

== Australia ==
- Myrtle Street

== Canada ==
- Manitoba Provincial Road 331
- Newfoundland and Labrador Route 331
- Nova Scotia Route 331
- Prince Edward Island Route 331

== Costa Rica ==
- National Route 331

== Hungary ==
- Main road 331 (Hungary)

== India ==
- National Highway 331 (India)

== Japan ==
- Japan National Route 331

== United States ==
- U.S. Route 331 (former)
- U.S. Route 331
- Arkansas Highway 331
- Florida:
  - Florida State Road 331
  - County Road 331A (Levy County, Florida)
- Georgia State Route 331
- Indiana State Road 331
- Kentucky Route 331
- Louisiana Highway 331
- Maryland Route 331
- M-331 (Michigan highway)
- Mississippi Highway 331 (unsigned)
- Montana Secondary Highway 331
- New York State Route 331
- Ohio State Route 331
- Oregon Route 331
- Pennsylvania Route 331
- Puerto Rico Highway 331
- Tennessee State Route 331
- Texas:
  - Texas State Highway 331 (former)
  - Texas State Highway Spur 331
  - Farm to Market Road 331
- Virginia State Route 331
- West Virginia Route 331
- Wyoming Highway 331

Preceded by 330	Lists of highways 331	Succeeded by 332
