= List of highways numbered 323 =

The following highways are numbered 323:

== Canada ==
- Quebec Route 323

== China ==
- China National Highway 323

== Costa Rica ==
- National Route 323

== Japan ==
- Japan National Route 323

== United States ==
- County Road 323 (Levy County, Florida)
- Georgia State Route 323
- Kentucky Route 323
- Louisiana Highway 323
- Minnesota State Highway 323
- Montana Secondary Highway 323
- New York State Route 323 (former)
- Ohio State Route 323
- Puerto Rico Highway 323
- Tennessee State Route 323
- Texas:
  - Texas State Highway 323
  - Texas State Highway Loop 323
  - Farm to Market Road 323
- Virginia State Route 323

Preceded by 322	Lists of highways 323	Succeeded by 324
