= List of highways numbered 332 =

Route 332, or Highway 332, may refer to:

== Canada ==
- Manitoba Provincial Road 332
- Newfoundland and Labrador Route 332
- Nova Scotia Route 332
- Prince Edward Island Route 332
- Saskatchewan Highway 332

== Costa Rica ==
- National Route 332

== India ==
- National Highway 332 (India)

== Japan ==
- Japan National Route 332

== United States ==
- Florida State Road 332 (former)
- Georgia State Route 332
- Indiana State Road 332
- Kentucky Route 332
- Louisiana Highway 332
- Maryland Route 332
- Minnesota State Highway 332
- Mississippi Highway 332
- Montana Secondary Highway 332
- New York State Route 332
- Ohio State Route 332
- Oregon Route 332
- Pennsylvania Route 332
- South Carolina Highway 332
- Tennessee State Route 332
- Texas:
  - Texas State Highway 332
  - Texas State Highway Loop 332 (former)
  - Farm to Market Road 332
- Virginia State Route 332
- Wyoming Highway 332

Other areas:

- Puerto Rico Highway 332
- U.S. Virgin Islands Highway 332

Preceded by 331	Lists of highways 332	Succeeded by 333
