= National Route 322 (Costa Rica) =

National Road Route in Costa Rica

National Tertiary Route 322
- Ruta nacional terciaria 322

Route information
- Maintained by Ministry of Public Works and Transport
- Length: 17.940 km (11.147 mi)

Location
- Country: Costa Rica
- Provinces: San José

Highway system
- National Road Network of Costa Rica
← Route 321	→ Route 323

National Tertiary Route 322, or just Route 322 (Spanish: Ruta Nacional Terciaria 322, or Ruta 322) is a National Road Route of Costa Rica, located in the San José province.

== Description ==
In San José province the route covers Pérez Zeledón canton (El General, Rivas, Cajón districts).
