= National Route 323 (Costa Rica) =

National Road Route in Costa Rica

National Tertiary Route 323
- Ruta nacional terciaria 323

Route information
- Maintained by Ministry of Public Works and Transport
- Length: 11.345 km (7.049 mi)

Location
- Country: Costa Rica
- Provinces: San José

Highway system
- National Road Network of Costa Rica
← Route 322	→ Route 324

National Tertiary Route 323, or just Route 323 (Spanish: Ruta Nacional Terciaria 323, or Ruta 323) is a National Road Route of Costa Rica, located in the San José province.

== Description ==
In San José province the route covers Pérez Zeledón canton (Rivas district).
