= National Route 327 (Costa Rica) =

National Road Route in Costa Rica

National Tertiary Route 327
- Ruta nacional terciaria 327

Route information
- Maintained by Ministry of Public Works and Transport
- Length: 10.110 km (6.282 mi)

Location
- Country: Costa Rica
- Provinces: San José

Highway system
- National Road Network of Costa Rica
← Route 326	→ Route 328

National Tertiary Route 327, or just Route 327 (Spanish: Ruta Nacional Terciaria 327, or Ruta 327) is a National Road Route of Costa Rica, located in the San José province.

== Description ==
In San José province the route covers Pérez Zeledón canton (San Pedro district).
