= National Route 242 (Costa Rica) =

National Road Route in Costa Rica

National Secondary Route 242
- Ruta nacional secundaria 242

Route information
- Maintained by Ministry of Public Works and Transport
- Length: 18.245 km (11.337 mi)

Location
- Country: Costa Rica
- Provinces: San José

Highway system
- National Road Network of Costa Rica
← Route 241	→ Route 243

National Secondary Route 242, or just Route 242 (Spanish: Ruta Nacional Secundaria 242, or Ruta 242) is a National Road Route of Costa Rica, located in the San José province.

== Description ==
In San José province the route covers Pérez Zeledón canton (San Isidro de El General, Daniel Flores, and Rivas districts).
