= National Route 324 (Costa Rica) =

National Road Route in Costa Rica

National Tertiary Route 324
- Ruta nacional terciaria 324

Route information
- Maintained by Ministry of Public Works and Transport
- Length: 26.080 km (16.205 mi)

Location
- Country: Costa Rica
- Provinces: San José

Highway system
- National Road Network of Costa Rica
← Route 323	→ Route 325

National Tertiary Route 324, or just Route 324 (Spanish: Ruta Nacional Terciaria 324, or Ruta 324) is a National Road Route of Costa Rica, located in the San José province.

== Description ==
In San José province the route covers Puriscal canton (Mercedes Sur district), Turrubares canton (Carara district).
