= Pejibaye District, Pérez Zeledón =

District in Pérez Zeledón canton, San José province, Costa Rica

Pejibaye
- District
- Pejibaye district
- Pejibaye district location in Costa Rica
- Coordinates: 9.149549°N 83.5602382°W
- Country: Costa Rica
- Province: San José
- Canton: Pérez Zeledón
- Creation: 13 May 1966

Area
  - Total: 140.78 km^{2} (54.36 sq mi)
- Elevation: 400 m (1,300 ft)

Population (2011)
  - Total: 7,995
  - Density: 56.79/km^{2} (147.1/sq mi)
- Time zone: UTC−06:00
- Postal code: 11907

Pejibaye is a district of the Pérez Zeledón canton, in the San José province of Costa Rica.

== History ==
Pejibaye was created on 13 May 1966 by Decreto Ejecutivo 2. Segregated from San Pedro.

== Geography ==
Pejibaye has an area of 140.78 km^{2} and an elevation of 400 metres.

== Demographics ==
Historical population
Census	Pop.	±% p.a.
1973	7,981	—
1984	7,916	−0.07%
2000	8,627	+0.54%
2011	7,995	−0.69%
2022	6,079	−2.46%
Source: Instituto Nacional de Estadística y Censos; Centro Centroamericano de Población

For the 2011 census, Pejibaye had a population of 7,995 inhabitants.

== Transportation ==
=== Road transportation ===
The district is covered by the following road routes:

- National Route 244
- National Route 329
- National Route 330
- National Route 331
- National Route 332
