= National Route 330 (Costa Rica) =

National Road Route in Costa Rica

National Tertiary Route 330
- Ruta nacional terciaria 330

Route information
- Maintained by Ministry of Public Works and Transport
- Length: 9.705 km (6.030 mi)

Location
- Country: Costa Rica
- Provinces: San José

Highway system
- National Road Network of Costa Rica
← Route 329	→ Route 331

National Tertiary Route 330, or just Route 330 (Spanish: Ruta Nacional Terciaria 330, or Ruta 330) is a National Road Route of Costa Rica, located in the San José province.

== Description ==
In San José province the route covers Pérez Zeledón canton (Pejibaye district).
