= National Route 325 (Costa Rica) =

National Road Route in Costa Rica

National Tertiary Route 325
- Ruta nacional terciaria 325

Route information
- Maintained by Ministry of Public Works and Transport
- Length: 10.190 km (6.332 mi)

Location
- Country: Costa Rica
- Provinces: San José

Highway system
- National Road Network of Costa Rica
← Route 324	→ Route 326

National Tertiary Route 325, or just Route 325 (Spanish: Ruta Nacional Terciaria 325, or Ruta 325) is a National Road Route of Costa Rica, located in the San José province.

== Description ==
In San José province the route covers Pérez Zeledón canton (San Isidro de El General, Páramo districts).
