= National Route 331 (Costa Rica) =

National Road Route in Costa Rica

National Tertiary Route 331
- Ruta nacional terciaria 331

Route information
- Maintained by Ministry of Public Works and Transport
- Length: 8.245 km (5.123 mi)

Location
- Country: Costa Rica
- Provinces: San José, Puntarenas

Highway system
- National Road Network of Costa Rica
← Route 330	→ Route 332

National Tertiary Route 331, or just Route 331 (Spanish: Ruta Nacional Terciaria 331, or Ruta 331) is a National Road Route of Costa Rica, located in the San José, Puntarenas provinces.

== Description ==
In San José province the route covers Pérez Zeledón canton (Pejibaye district).

In Puntarenas province the route covers Buenos Aires canton (Colinas district).
