= Estadio Municipal Pérez Zeledón =

Stadium in Pérez Zeledón, Costa Raca

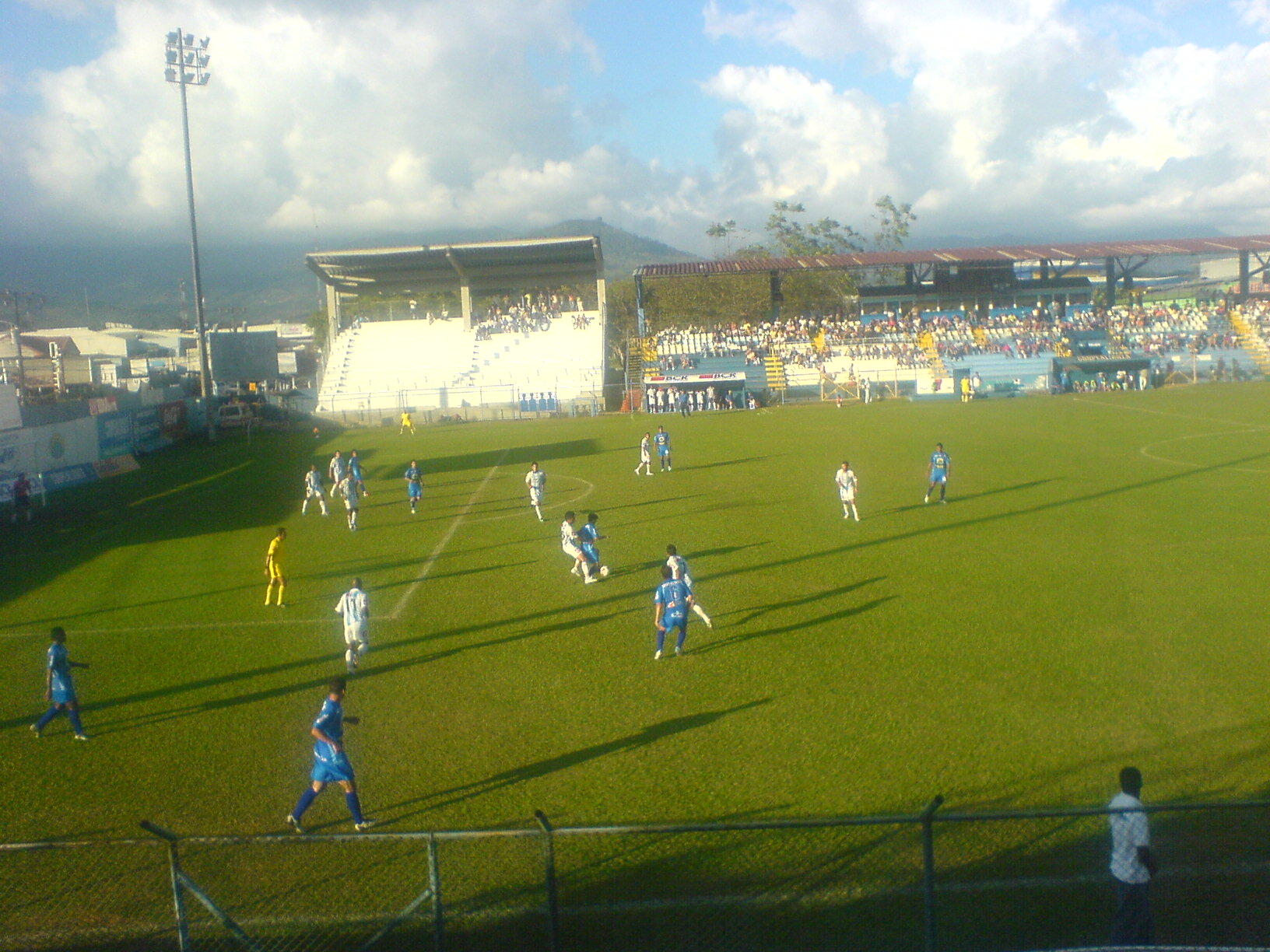
- Interactive map of Estadio Municipal Pérez Zeledón
- Former names: Estadio Municipal Otto Ureña Fallas
- Location: Pérez Zeledón, San José (San José, Costa Rica)
- Coordinates: 09°22′07.63″N 83°42′16.75″W
- Owner: Pérez Zeledón Canton Government
- Capacity: 3,259
- Surface: Grass

Construction
- Opened: 1953

Tenant
- Municipal Pérez Zeledón

Estadio Municipal Pérez Zeledón is a multi-use stadium in Pérez Zeledón, Costa Rica. It is currently used mostly for football matches and is the home stadium of the Costa Rican FPD team Municipal Pérez Zeledón.

== History ==
It was inaugurated in 1953 as Estadio Municipal Otto Ureña Fallas because of the former Costa Rican player and then owner of the A.D. Municipal Pérez Zeledón who used to play for the now defunct A.D. Municipal Generaleña.

Then in 1991 with the ascension of A.D. Municipal Pérez Zeledón to the first division, it became their venue for home games, since there was a conflict between the two teams of the area because back then there can only be one team per area, they merge into one and the stadium became their home venue

== Controversy ==
In 2014, the Municipality of Pérez Zeledón intended the stadium as "Estadio Municipal Keylor Navas Gamboa", named after Costa Rican and Real Madrid's, goalkeeper Keylor Navas, due to his outstanding performance with the Costa Rica national football team at the 2014 FIFA World Cup who get all the way over to the quarter-finals just by losing to Netherlands in a penalty shootout. However, the renaming procedure has been deemed as illegal by the Costa Rican National Committee of Nomenclature, arguing that a stadium can only be named after somebody just as a posthumous tribute. This law enforcement was controversial since many of the stadiums currently active for many of the First Division team are named in honor of former domestic football players who aren't posthumous honors, like the "Cuty" Monge Stadium in Desamparados or the "Colleya" Fonseca in Guadalupe or the Allen Riggioni in Alajuela.
