= Rivas District =

District in Pérez Zeledón canton, San José province, Costa Rica

Rivas
- District
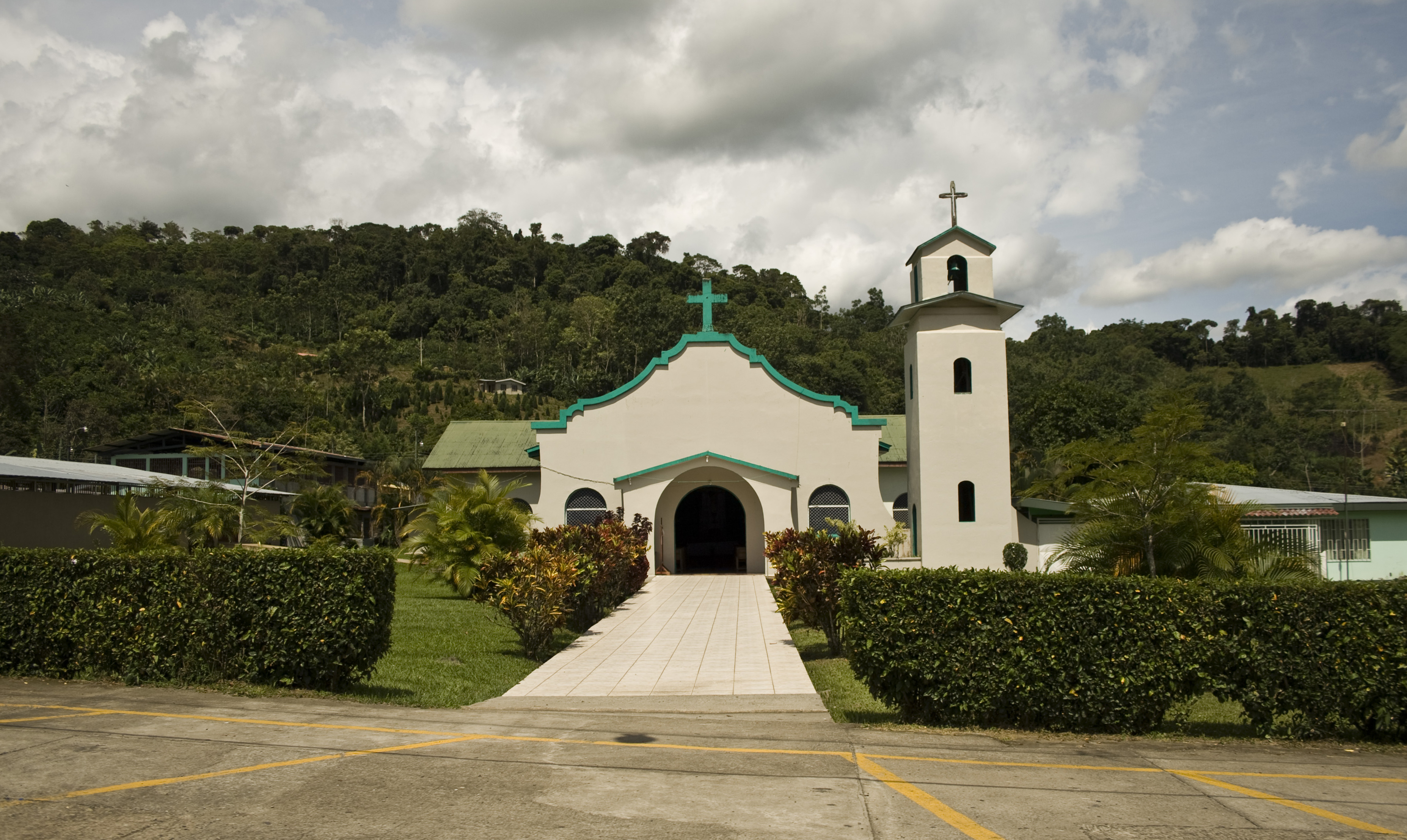
- Rivas Church
- Rivas district
- Rivas district location in Costa Rica
- Coordinates: 9.4851959°N 83.5941563°W
- Country: Costa Rica
- Province: San José
- Canton: Pérez Zeledón

Area
  - Total: 310.28 km^{2} (119.80 sq mi)
- Elevation: 870 m (2,850 ft)

Population (2011)
  - Total: 6,591
  - Density: 21.24/km^{2} (55.02/sq mi)
- Time zone: UTC−06:00
- Postal code: 11904

Rivas is a district of the Pérez Zeledón canton, in the San José province of Costa Rica.

== Geography ==
Rivas has an area of 310.28 km^{2} and an elevation of 870 metres.

This town lies south of a mountain chain Cordillera de Talamanca result of tectonic uplift between Cocos Plate and Caribbean Plate.

The town is positioned a kilometer north of where the Buenavista River and the Chirripó Pacífico River converge to form the General River.

== Demographics ==
Historical population
| Census | Pop. | ±% p.a. |
|---|---|---|
| 1927 | 253 | — |
| 1950 | 1,547 | +8.19% |
| 1963 | 2,449 | +3.60% |
| 1973 | 4,885 | +7.15% |
| 1984 | 4,977 | +0.17% |
| 2000 | 6,531 | +1.71% |
| 2011 | 6,591 | +0.08% |
| 2022 | 8,032 | +1.81% |
Source: Instituto Nacional de Estadística y Censos; Centro Centroamericano de Población

For the 2011 census, Rivas had a population of 6,591 inhabitants.

== Transportation ==
=== Road transportation ===
The district is covered by the following road routes:

- National Route 2
- National Route 242
- National Route 322
- National Route 323

== Economy ==
=== Tourism ===
This town is on the way to the Chirripó National Park.

== Archaeology ==
Originally discovered in the 1980s through archaeological surveys of the region by Robert Drolet, the Rivas site is one of 15 Chiriquí Period (AD 750-1500) archaeological sites known within the river valley. Although the site is covered with agricultural plots, numerous cobble house foundations and upright boulders are present throughout the area indicating the presence of an archaeological site.

Excavations at Rivas began in 1992 under the direction of Jeffrey Quilter of the Peabody Museum of Archaeology and Ethnology, Harvard University. His excavations identified structures similar to those found by Drolet at the site of Murciélago, Costa Rica.

Throughout the 6-year project at Rivas, Quilter identified several residential areas. Construction of these structures consisted of river cobbles aligned in circular patterns of various sizes, typically with adjoining rectangular patios. The smallest structures measured 10m in diameter and the largest were up to 30m in diameter. Additional architectural features including paths, causeways, plazas, and stairways were also recorded throughout the site.

It is unclear what function that these structures served within the broader context of the site as a whole. The majority of ceramic artifacts found in these area were shattered and found on the exterior of these structures. Ceramic sherds were rarely found on the interior. This suggests that many of these structures were living areas where refuse pottery was swept outside.

Chiriqui period cemeteries located near the site may have corresponded to specific habitation areas within the Rivas population. Burials in these areas had no apparent pattern with regards to their placement and were distinguished by carefully placed river cobbles within a defined area. The quality and quantity of grave goods within these burials indicates a possible status differentiation between the two cemeteries. None of the graves contained gold or tumbaga artifacts.

A separate, possibly ceremonial, area was also found at the site. Researchers originally thought that this area was a cemetery site because of the tomb-like concentrations of river cobbles. However, excavations proved that it was neither a cemetery nor a habitation area. A nearby staircase may have connected this portion of the site to the Panteón de La Reina on the overlying ridge. It was therefore concluded that this part of the site was probably an area where rituals were performed in preparation of burial on the ridge.

=== Artifact assemblage ===
Over 600,000 ceramic pot sherds were recovered at the site of Rivas. The research team focused on diagnostic pieces, such as rims and decorated body sherds, in their collection efforts. Further examination showed that 60% of the rims and 72% of the other sherds were decorated in the Buenos Aires Polychrome tradition. This pottery style is generally considered to be "fiesta ware" of the Chiriquí Period in the chronology of Costa Rican art. The second-most represented ceramic style in the assemblage was classified as Red Wares composed of Sangria Red Fine and Turucaca White-On-Red styles.

A total of 8,632 examples of stone artifacts were found at the Rivas site. Made primarily from andesite and basalt, all but 35 of these artifacts were chipped stone tools. The majority of these tools were classified as endscrapers and perforators. Ground stone artifacts were rarely found and consisted of one adze, 8 celts, and fractured remnants of manos and metates.

Several figurines made of solid clay and no larger than 7 cm tall were also uncovered. These figurines generally depicted women in a seated position with their legs extended and open. Often, these figures were found with the head broken off.

The excavations also discovered examples of ceramic musical instruments. One large fragmentary rattle was found in one of the cemeteries was shaped into the form of a squash blossom. A ceramic bead was encased in an open hollow of the instrument to create the desired musical affect. Two ceramic whistles were found at the site as well. One of them was in the form of a human head and was probably intended to be worn around the neck. The other whistle was in the form of a bird with folded wings and was one of the examples of animal figurines at the site.
