= Páramo District =

District in Pérez Zeledón canton, San José province, Costa Rica

Páramo
- District
- Páramo district
- Páramo district location in Costa Rica
- Coordinates: 9.4928201°N 83.7650023°W
- Country: Costa Rica
- Province: San José
- Canton: Pérez Zeledón
- Creation: 18 January 1984

Area
  - Total: 203.17 km^{2} (78.44 sq mi)
- Elevation: 900 m (3,000 ft)

Population (2011)
  - Total: 4,410
  - Density: 21.7/km^{2} (56.2/sq mi)
- Time zone: UTC−06:00
- Postal code: 11911

Páramo is a district of the Pérez Zeledón canton, in the San José province of Costa Rica.

== History ==
Páramo was created on 18 January 1984 by Acuerdo Ejecutivo 129.

== Geography ==
Páramo has an area of 203.17 km^{2} and an elevation of 900 metres.

== Demographics ==
Historical population
Census	Pop.	±% p.a.
1984	3,074	—
2000	4,225	+2.01%
2011	4,410	+0.39%
2022	5,288	+1.66%
Source: Instituto Nacional de Estadística y Censos; Centro Centroamericano de Población

For the 2011 census, Páramo had a population of 4,410 inhabitants.

== Transportation ==
=== Road transportation ===
The district is covered by the following road routes:

- National Route 2
- National Route 325
- National Route 335
