= National Route 244 (Costa Rica) =

National Road Route in Costa Rica

National Secondary Route 244
- Ruta nacional secundaria 244

Route information
- Maintained by Ministry of Public Works and Transport
- Length: 21.665 km (13.462 mi)

Location
- Country: Costa Rica
- Provinces: San José

Highway system
- National Road Network of Costa Rica
← Route 243	→ Route 245

National Secondary Route 244, or just Route 244 (Spanish: Ruta Nacional Secundaria 244, or Ruta 244) is a National Road Route of Costa Rica, located in the San José province.

== Description ==
In San José province the route covers Pérez Zeledón canton (Daniel Flores, Platanares, and Pejibaye districts).
