= National Route 329 (Costa Rica) =

National Road Route in Costa Rica

National Tertiary Route 329
- Ruta nacional terciaria 329

Route information
- Maintained by Ministry of Public Works and Transport
- Length: 10.260 km (6.375 mi)

Location
- Country: Costa Rica
- Provinces: San José

Highway system
- National Road Network of Costa Rica
← Route 328	→ Route 330

National Tertiary Route 329, or just Route 329 (Spanish: Ruta Nacional Terciaria 329, or Ruta 329) is a National Road Route of Costa Rica, located in the San José province.

== Description ==
In San José province the route covers Pérez Zeledón canton (Platanares, Pejibaye districts).
