= National Route 328 (Costa Rica) =

National Road Route in Costa Rica

National Tertiary Route 328
- Ruta nacional terciaria 328

Route information
- Maintained by Ministry of Public Works and Transport
- Length: 23.155 km (14.388 mi)

Location
- Country: Costa Rica
- Provinces: San José

Highway system
- National Road Network of Costa Rica
← Route 327	→ Route 329

National Tertiary Route 328, or just Route 328 (Spanish: Ruta Nacional Terciaria 328, or Ruta 328) is a National Road Route of Costa Rica, located in the San José province. The route covers Pérez Zeledón canton (San Isidro de El General, Río Nuevo districts).
