= El General, Pérez Zeledón =

District in Pérez Zeledón canton, San José province, Costa Rica

El General
- District
- Interactive map of El General
- El General district location in Costa Rica
- Coordinates: 9.3527029°N 83.6041988°W
- Country: Costa Rica
- Province: San José
- Canton: Pérez Zeledón

Area
  - Total: 76.35 km^{2} (29.48 sq mi)
- Elevation: 710 m (2,330 ft)

Population (2011)
  - Total: 6,373
  - Density: 83.47/km^{2} (216.2/sq mi)
- Time zone: UTC−06:00
- Postal code: 11902

El General is a district of the Pérez Zeledón canton, in the San José province of Costa Rica. Its head village is General Viejo.

== History ==
General Viejo's colonization began at the end of the 19th century. Manuel Estrada settled in this land in 1870. Also, Marta Durán Elizondo and her husband Trino Montero, who was known as "Don Trino", were one of the few families that founded what is now the population of the General Valley.

== Geography ==
El General has an area of 76.35 km^{2} and an elevation of 710 metres.

== Demographics ==
Historical population
Census	Pop.	±% p.a.
1892	284	—
1927	479	+1.50%
1950	1,875	+6.11%
1963	2,310	+1.62%
1973	3,250	+3.47%
1984	3,576	+0.87%
2000	5,882	+3.16%
2011	6,373	+0.73%
2022	7,282	+1.22%
Source: Instituto Nacional de Estadística y Censos; Centro Centroamericano de Población

For the 2011 census, El General had a population of 6,373 inhabitants.

== Transportation ==
=== Road transportation ===
The district is covered by the following road routes:

- National Route 321
- National Route 322
- National Route 326
