= National Route 332 (Costa Rica) =

National Road Route in Costa Rica

National Tertiary Route 332
- Ruta nacional terciaria 332

Route information
- Maintained by Ministry of Public Works and Transport
- Length: 16.340 km (10.153 mi)

Location
- Country: Costa Rica
- Provinces: San José

Highway system
- National Road Network of Costa Rica
← Route 331	→ Route 333

National Tertiary Route 332, or just Route 332 (Spanish: Ruta Nacional Terciaria 332, or Ruta 332) is a National Road Route of Costa Rica, located in the San José province.

== Description ==
In San José province the route covers Pérez Zeledón canton (Pejibaye, La Amistad districts).
