= Pérez Zeledón (canton) =

Canton in San José province, Costa Rica

- Canton
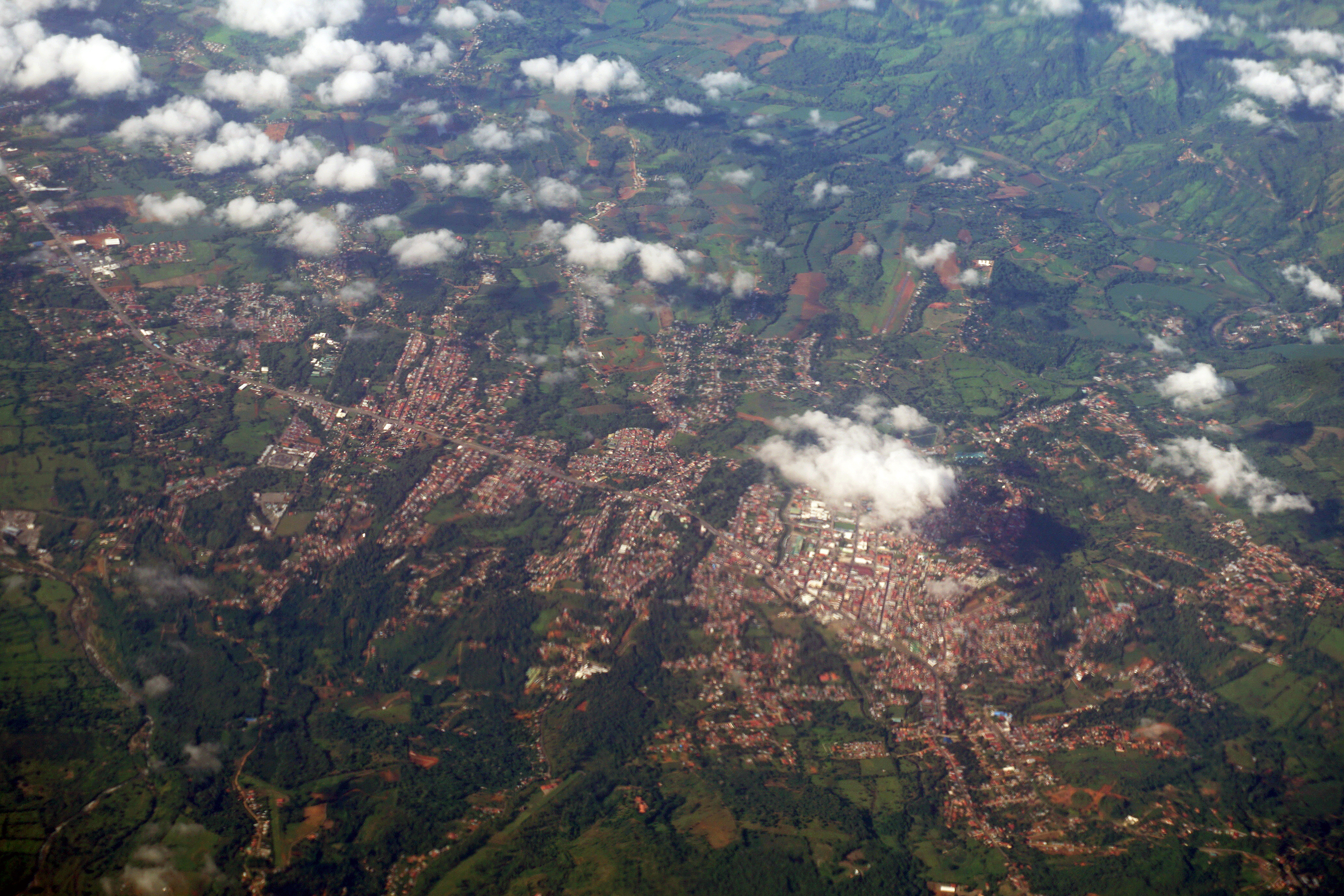
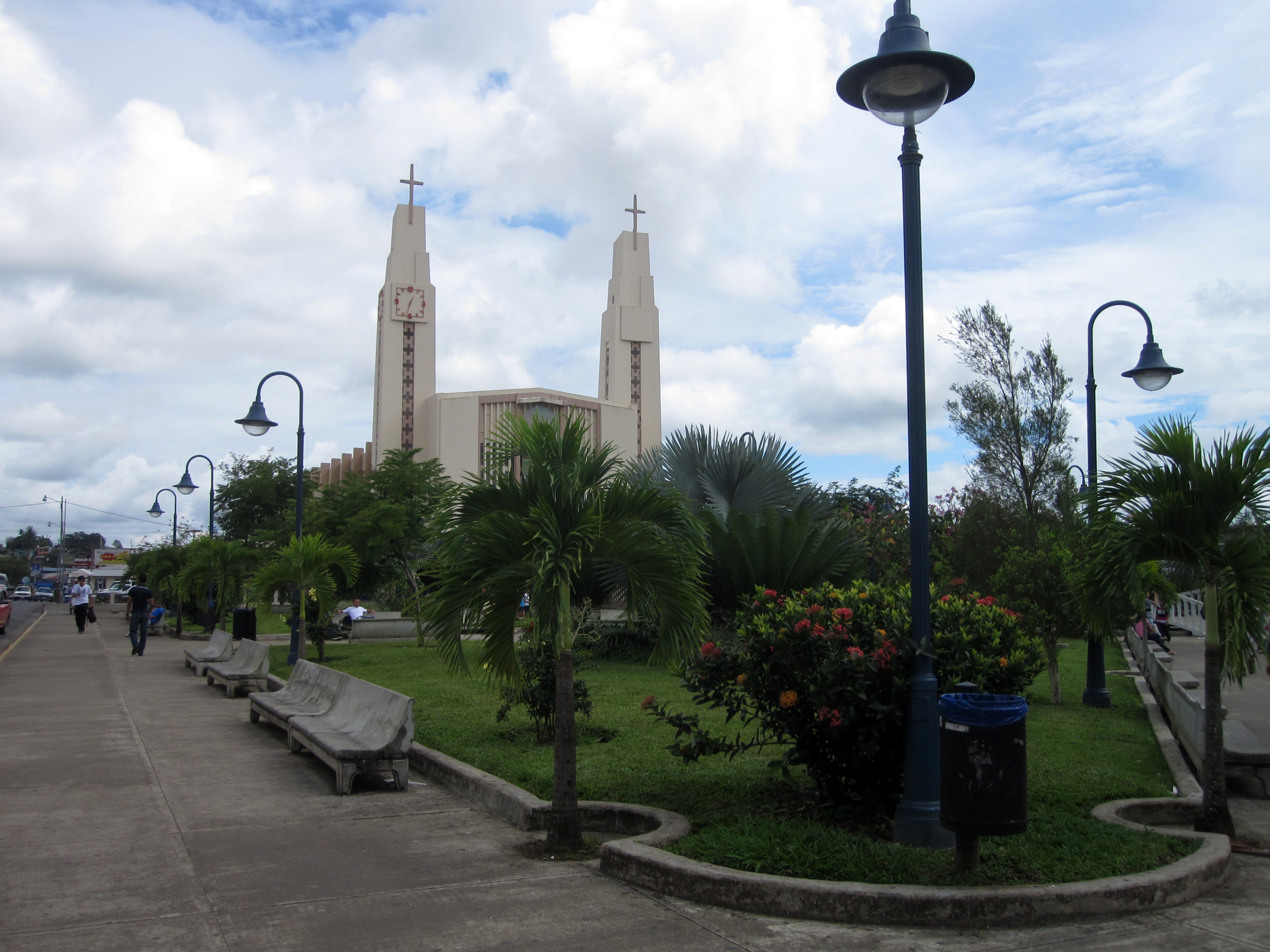
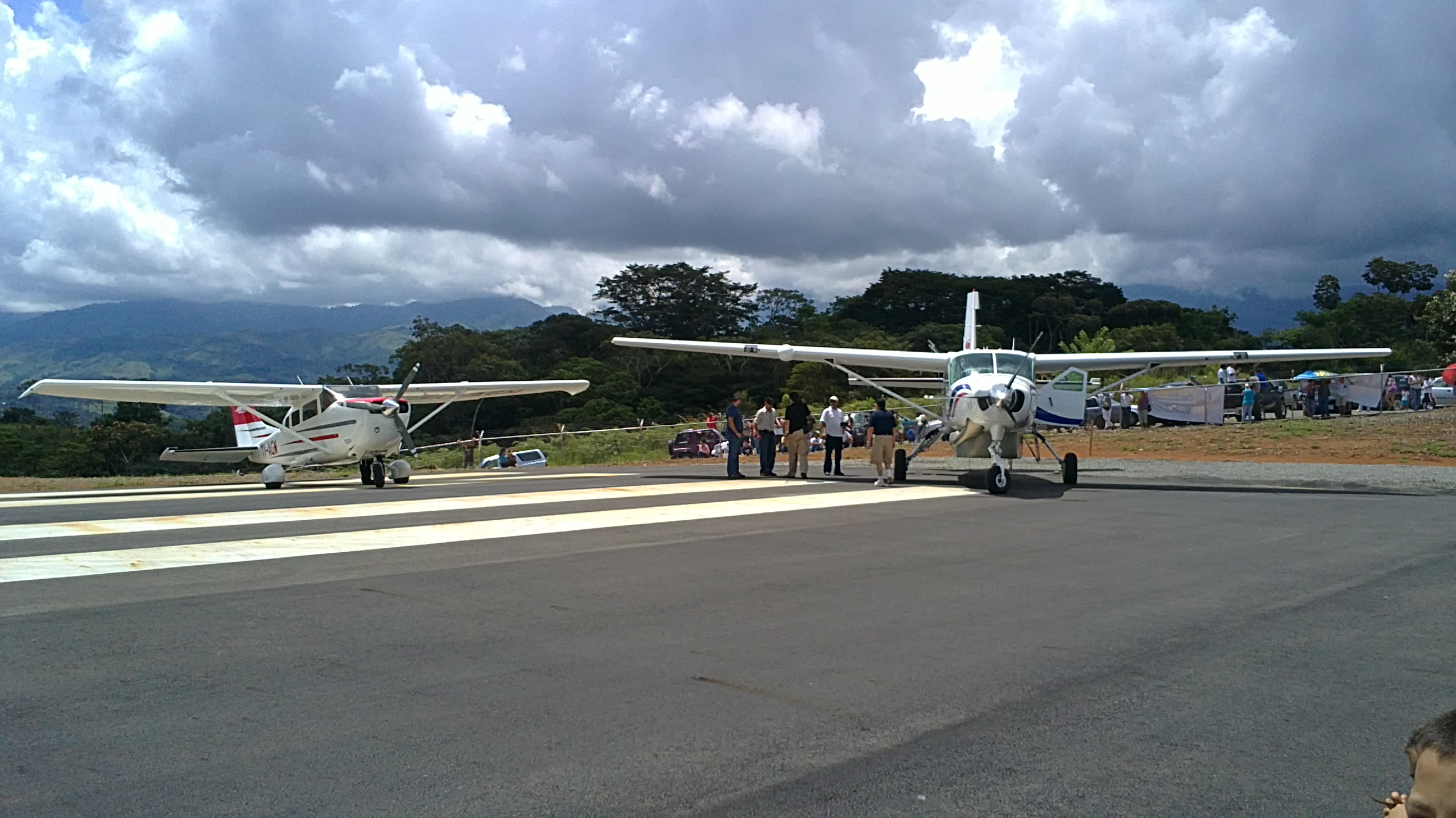
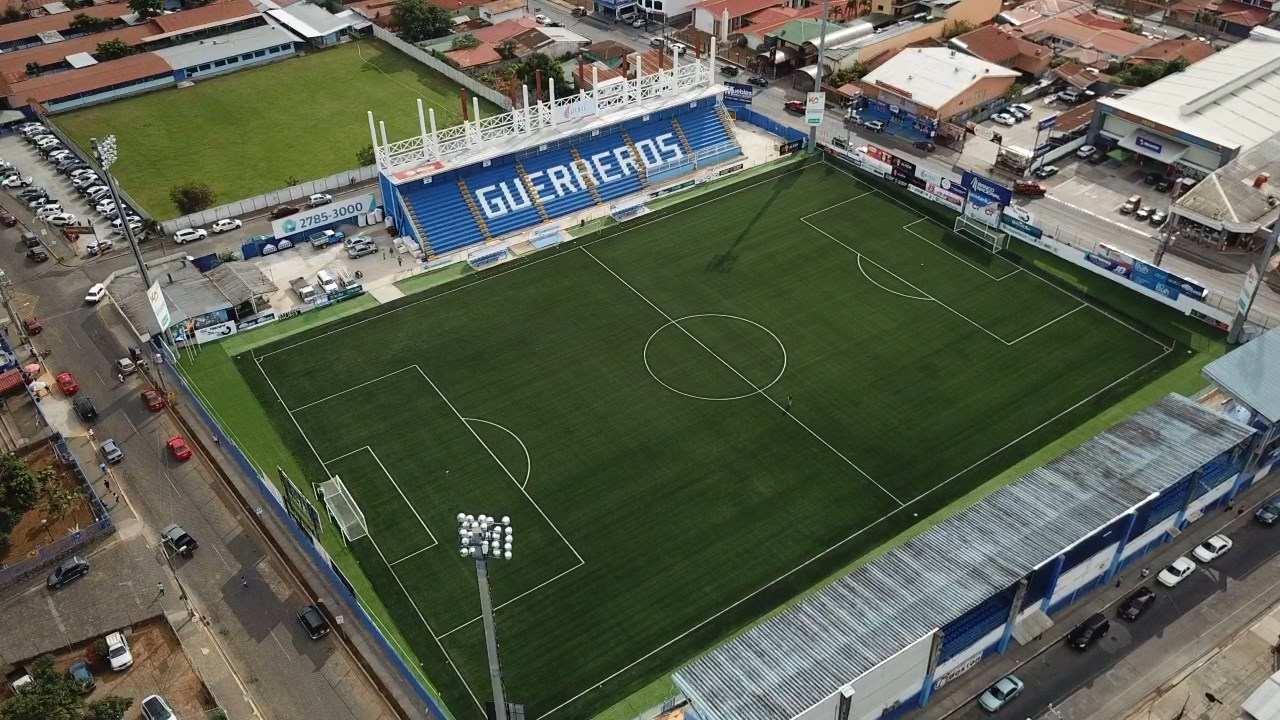
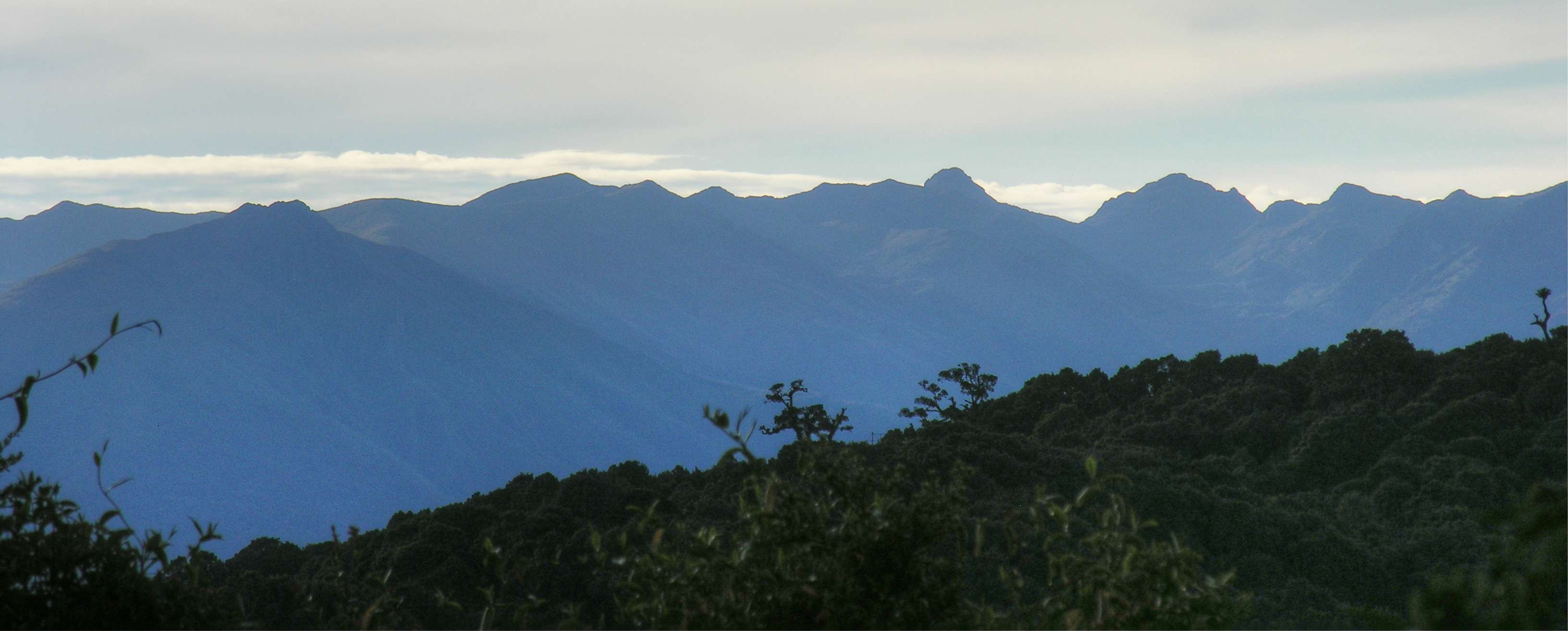
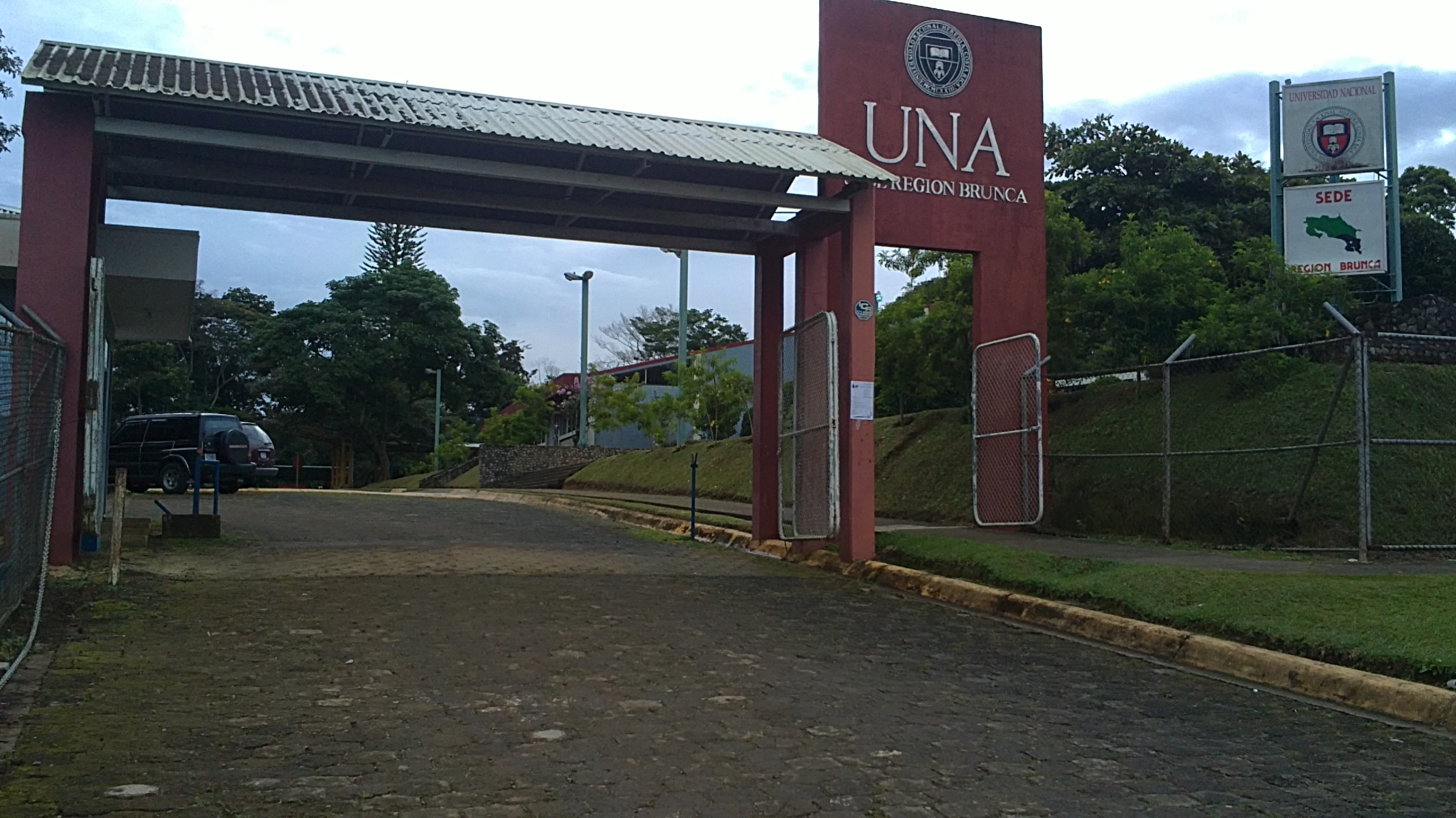
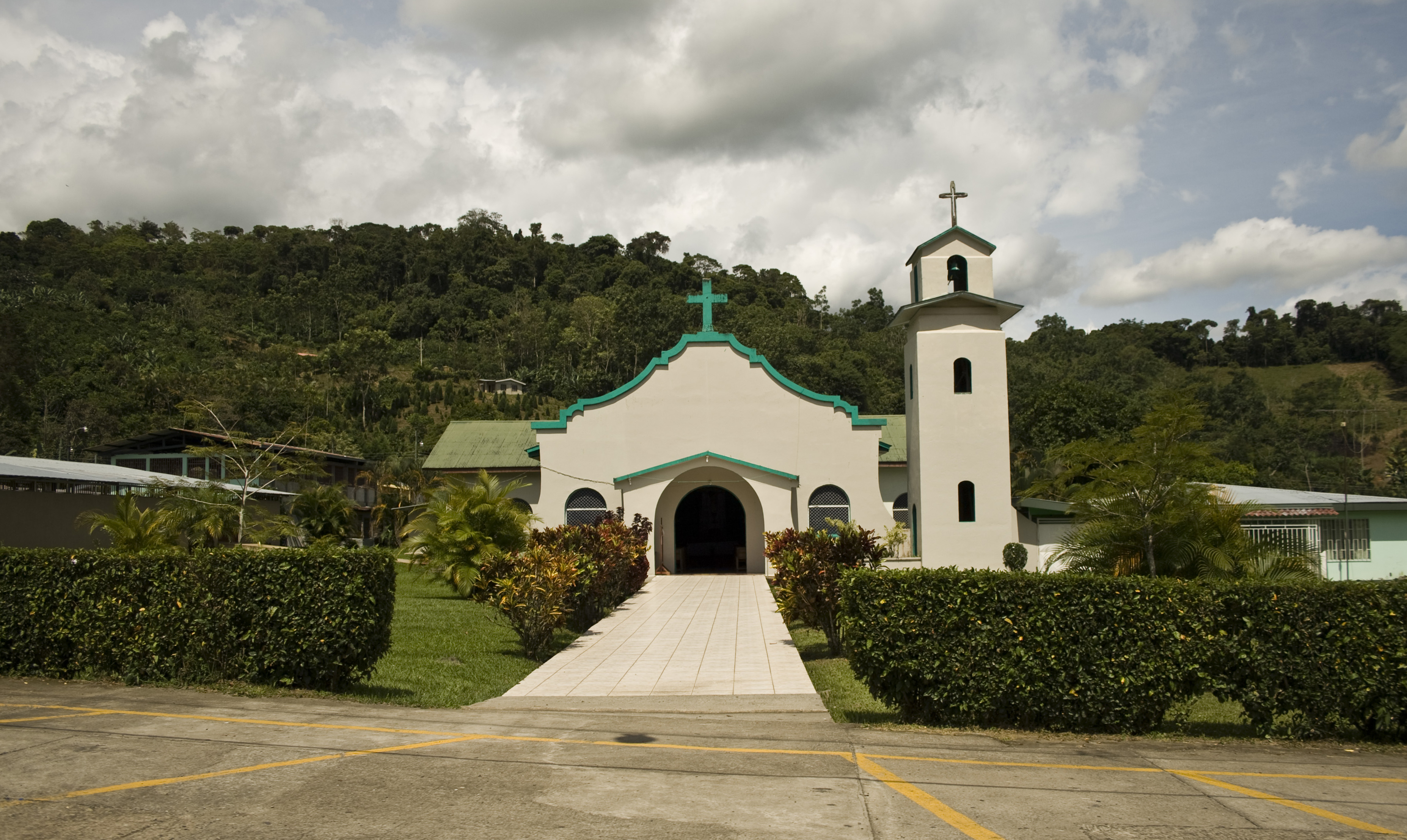
- Aerial view of San Isidro de El General Cathedral of Isidore the Laborer San Isidro de El General Airport Pérez Zeledón Municipal Stadium Cerro de la Muerte Regional Branch of the National University of Costa Rica Immaculate Conception Church in Rivas

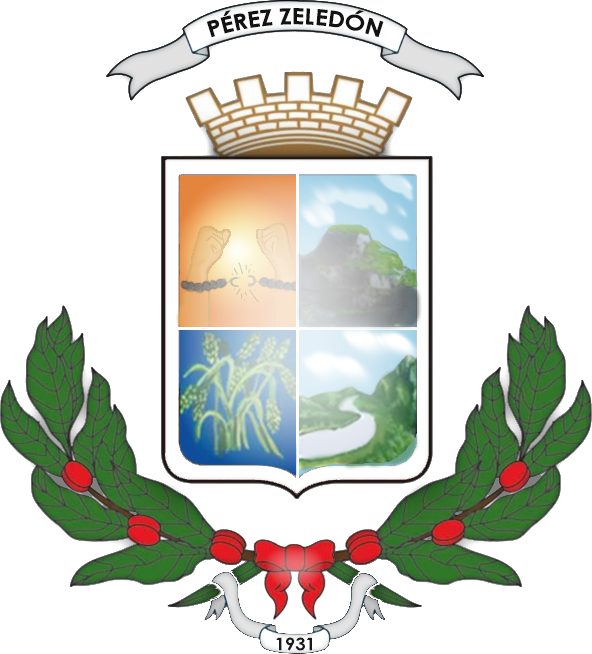
- Flag Seal
- Nickname: Pezeta ("P.Z.")
- Motto: Luchemos Valientemente por el Progreso del Valle (Spanish) "Let us fight bravely for the progress of the Valley"
- Anthem: Himno Municipal de Pérez Zeledón
- Pérez Zeledón canton
- Pérez Zeledón canton location in San José Province Pérez Zeledón canton location in Costa Rica
- Coordinates: 9.3392039°N 83.7152394°W
- Country: Costa Rica
- Province: San José
- Creation: 9 October 1931
- Named for: Pedro Pérez Zeledón
- Head city: San Isidro de El General
- Districts: Districts: San Isidro de El General; El General; Daniel Flores; Rivas; San Pedro; Platanares; Pejibaye; Cajón; Barú; Río Nuevo; Páramo; La Amistad

Government
  - Type: Municipality
  - Body: Municipalidad de Pérez Zeledón
  - Mayor: Emmanuel Ceciliano Alfaro (PUSC)

Area
  - Total: 1,901.08 km^{2} (734.01 sq mi)
- Elevation: 690 m (2,260 ft)

Population (2011)
  - Total: 134,534
  - Estimate (2022): 156,917
  - Density: 70.7671/km^{2} (183.286/sq mi)
- Time zone: UTC−06:00
- Canton code: 119
- Website: www.perezzeledon.go.cr

Pérez Zeledón is the nineteenth canton of the province of San José in Costa Rica, located in the Brunca Region. It is the sixth-most populous canton in the country and is the 7th largest by area. The capital of the canton is San Isidro de El General.

The Río Savegre establishes the canton's boundaries on the northwest, the Río Guabo and a series of coastal mountain ranges on the southwest and south, and the peaks of the highest mountains of the Cordillera de Talamanca (Talamanca Mountain Range) on the east. In the middle of the canton, the Río General, from which the canton's capital city takes its name, runs north to south.

== History ==
Pérez Zeledón was created on 9 October 1931 by decree 31. It originally had four initial districts: Ureña, El General, Daniel Flores, and Rivas, with Ureña being the capital.

=== Early Costa Rican Settlements ===
Near the end of the 19th century, between 1870 and 1899, quite a few families lived in El General valley. The hamlets (Spanish: Caseríos) of El General, Palmares, Rivas, and Ureña were further populated from 1900 onward.

The Caserío area of Ureña grew significantly. By 1911, during Ricardo Jiménez Oreamuno's administration, the Refuges of Ojo de Agua, El Cerro de la Muerte, and División were established. These refuges would further advance the growth of the region known today as Pérez Zeledón and El General Valley.

=== Costa Rican Civil War ===
San Isidro de El General, Pérez Zeledón's capital, was awarded the recognition of Ciudad Mártir, regarding the civil war of 1948, as established by Decree Nº274. This decree established official legal recognition of the city's participation in the civil war of 1948. A section of the decree states (in Spanish):

la Junta Fundadora de la Segunda República, apreciando el noble esfuerzo y la valiosa contribución de San Isidro de El General, se siente obligada a hacer un público y oficial reconocimiento de tan loable conducta para que de ninguna manera quede ella relegada al olvido, sino que constantemente sea exaltada como merecen los grandes hechos dignos de vida eterna en los fastos nacionales.

In English, this would loosely translate into:

The Founding Junta of the Second Republic, appreciating the noble effort and valuable contribution of San Isidro de El General, feels compelled to make a public and official recognition of such praiseworthy conduct that by no means be it relegated to oblivion, but rather constantly be exalted as great deeds merit worth of eternal life in the national splendor.

Pérez Zeledón was also the location of significant battles during the Costa Rican Civil War. The most notable battle was the Battle of San Isidro de El General. This battle was carried out at around 6:30 a.m. when 200 government forces engaged the revolutionaries at the city's central plaza. The fight was won by José Figueres Ferrer and his revolutionary forces, which secured the southern Pacific region of Costa Rica in rebel hands.

== Geography ==
Pérez Zeledón has an area of 1,901.08 km^{2} (734.01 sq mi) and a mean elevation of 690 m (2,260 ft).

== Government ==
=== Mayor ===
Under the Municipal Code of 1998, which regulates local government in Costa Rica, mayors and vice mayors are democratically elected every four years on a joint ticket by the canton’s residents.

As of the latest municipal elections in 2024, the Social Christian Unity Party candidate, Emmanuel Ceciliano Alfaro, was elected mayor of the canton with 28.99% of the votes, with Rosibel Ramos Madrigal and Mario Esteban Saenz Mena as first and second vice mayors, respectively.

Mayors of Pérez Zeledón since the 2002 elections
Period	Name	Party
2002–2006	Rosibel Ramos Madrigal	PUSC
2006–2010	Rosibel Ramos Madrigal	PUSC
2010–2016	Luis Mendieta Escudero	PLN
2016–2020	Jeffry Montoya Rodríguez	PUSC
2020–2024	Jeffry Montoya Rodríguez	PUSC
2024–2028	Emmanuel Ceciliano Alfaro	PUSC

=== Municipal Council ===
Like the mayor and vice mayors, all members of the Municipal Council (known as regidores) are elected every four years through a closed list system, though on a separate ballot from the canton’s executive officials. The Pérez Zeledón Municipal Council consists of nine seats, held by regidores and their substitutes. Substitutes can participate in meetings but do not have voting rights unless the primary regidor (regidor propietario) is absent.

The current president of the Municipal Council is the Broad Front member, Andrea Herrera Chaves, with the National Liberation Party regidor, Edgar Mena Rodríguez, as vice president. The Municipal Council's composition for the 2024–2028 period is as follows:

Current composition of the Municipal Council of Pérez Zeledón after the 2024 municipal elections
Political parties in the Municipal Council of Pérez Zeledón
Political party	Regidores		
Political party	№	Primary	Substitute
Social Christian Unity Party (PUSC)	3	Runny Monge Zúñiga	Andrés Vega Solís
Social Christian Unity Party (PUSC)	3	Anaís Barrantes Mora	María Alejandra Arias Calvo
Social Christian Unity Party (PUSC)	3	Carlos Zúñiga Montero	Carlos Andrés Mora Navarro
Our Town Party (PNP)	3	Marvin Arias Retana	Álvaro Navarro Navarro
Our Town Party (PNP)	3	Milena Elizondo Segura	Dignora Alvarado Roquett (Note: Also legally known as Nora Alvarado Roquett)
Our Town Party (PNP)	3	Wilber Ureña Bonilla (Note: Also legally known as Wilberth Ureña Bonilla)	José Francisco Calderón Fernández
National Liberation Party (PLN)	1	Edgar Mena Rodríguez^{(VP)}	Henry Alberto Mora Espinoza
Broad Front (FA)	1	Andrea Herrera Chaves^{(P)}	Luz María Godínez Méndez
Social Democratic Progress Party (PSD)	1	María Josefa Fallas Ureña	Weslyn Dahianna Mena Ríos

== Districts ==
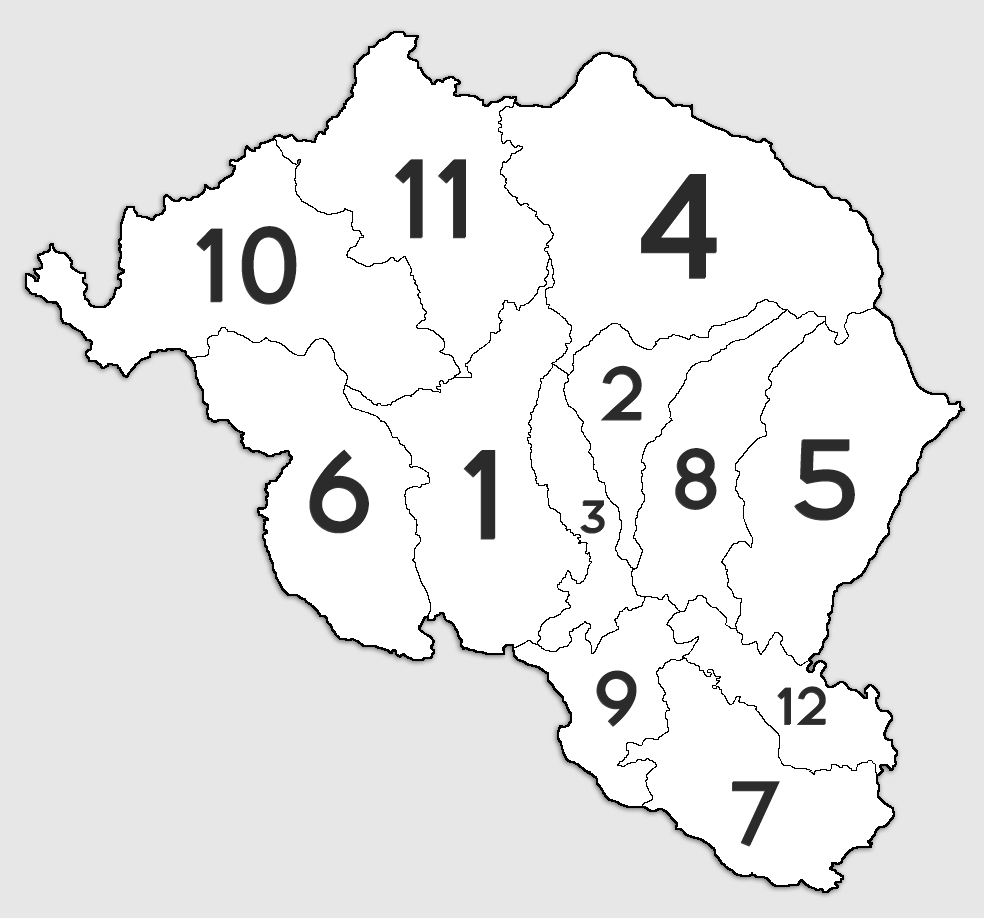
Districts of Pérez Zeledón

The canton of Pérez Zeledón is subdivided into the following districts:

1. San Isidro de El General
2. El General
3. Daniel Flores
4. Rivas
5. San Pedro
6. Platanares
7. Pejibaye
8. Cajón
9. Barú
10. Río Nuevo
11. Páramo
12. La Amistad

== Demographics ==
Historical population
Census	Pop.	±% p.a.
1950	19,630	—
1963	47,319	+7.00%
1973	67,089	+3.55%
1984	82,370	+1.88%
2000	122,187	+2.50%
2011	134,534	+0.88%
2022	156,917	+1.41%
Source: Instituto Nacional de Estadística y Censos; Centro Centroamericano de Población

Pérez Zeledón had an estimated population of 156,917 people in 2022. It had 134,534 inhabitants at the time of the 2011 census.

According to a publication by the United Nations Development Programme, Pérez Zeledón had a Human Development Index of 0.746.

== Economy ==
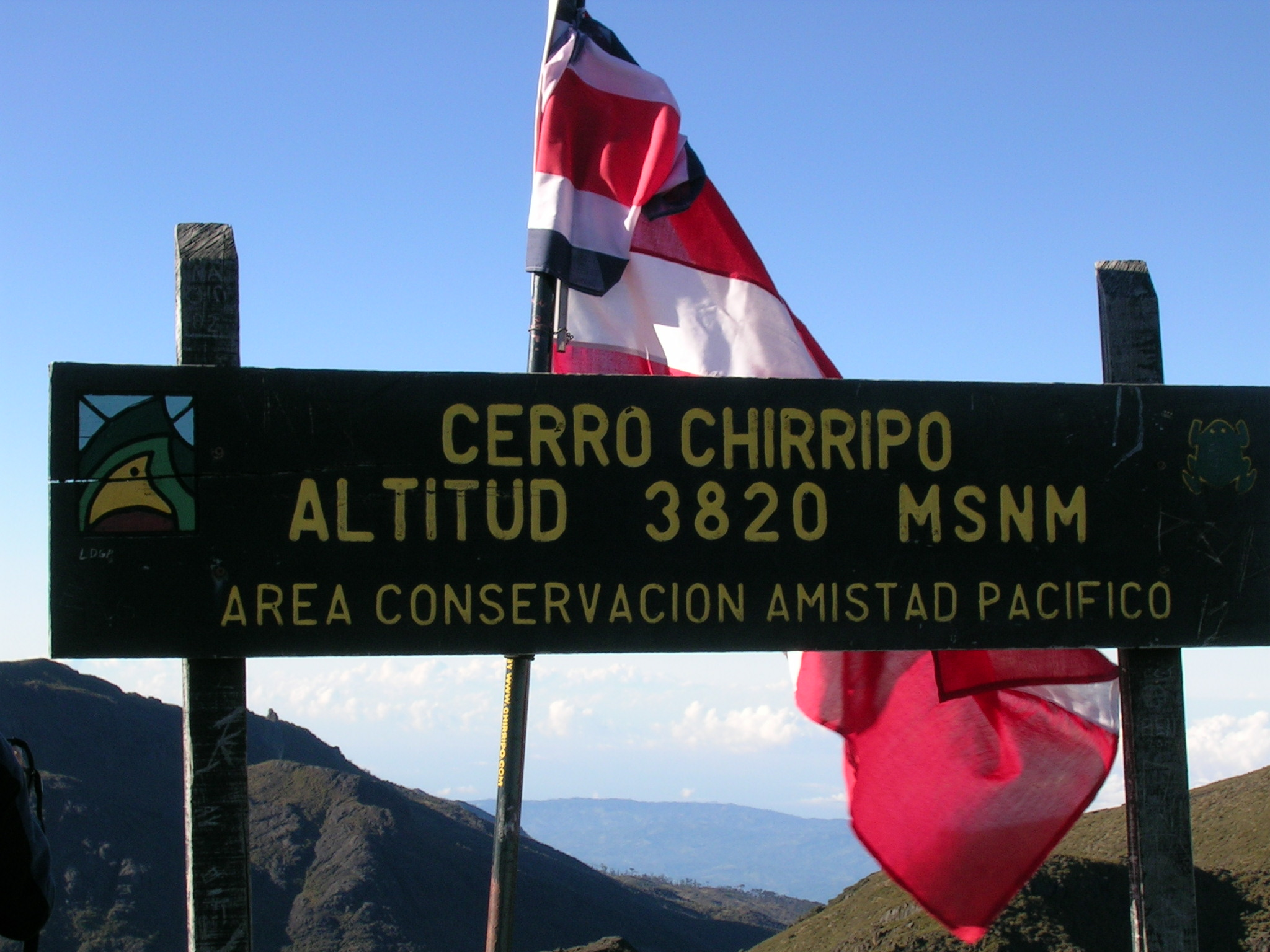
Chirripó National Park 3820 meters above sea level

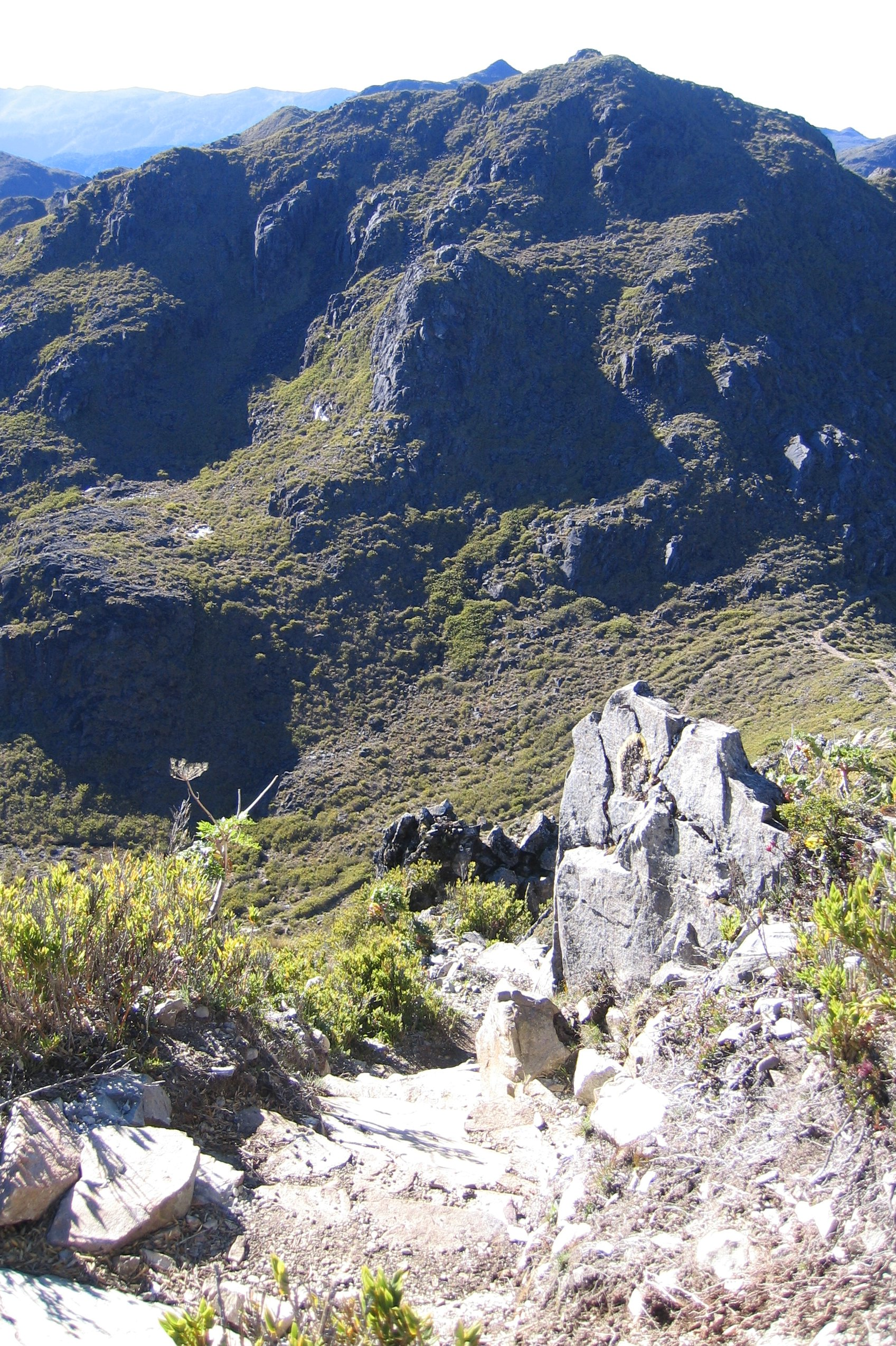
Picture of Cerro Chirripó

The canton of Pérez Zeledón's economic development has been characterized mainly through agriculture, livestock, trade, industry, and tourism. One factor that has driven this economic development is the canton's unique geographic positioning, which makes it a sort of 'bridge' between Costa Rica's capital (San José) and the southern areas of the country, especially those that border Panamá.

Important agricultural activities:

- Sugar Cane cultivation
- Coffee
- Tiquizque cultivation
- Banana cultivation
- Blackberry cultivation

The first two products are the most important in the region.

Livestock activities are also economically relevant, with pigs and cattle being the most important. The latter is used for fattening and dairy.

Commercial activities have boomed in recent decades, mainly due to the establishment of credit unions, banks, local companies, media, and various other companies of the Central Valley (San José) setting up operations in the canton.

=== Tourism ===
The area's main attraction is its ecological diversity. Tourist sites in the area include the Chirripó National Park, one of the highest peaks in Central America and the Caribbean, at 3,820 meters above sea level.

Among other attractions are the journeys along the rapids.

Another prominent park in the area is the Parque Internacional La Amistad, literally 'The Friendship International Park'.

== Education ==
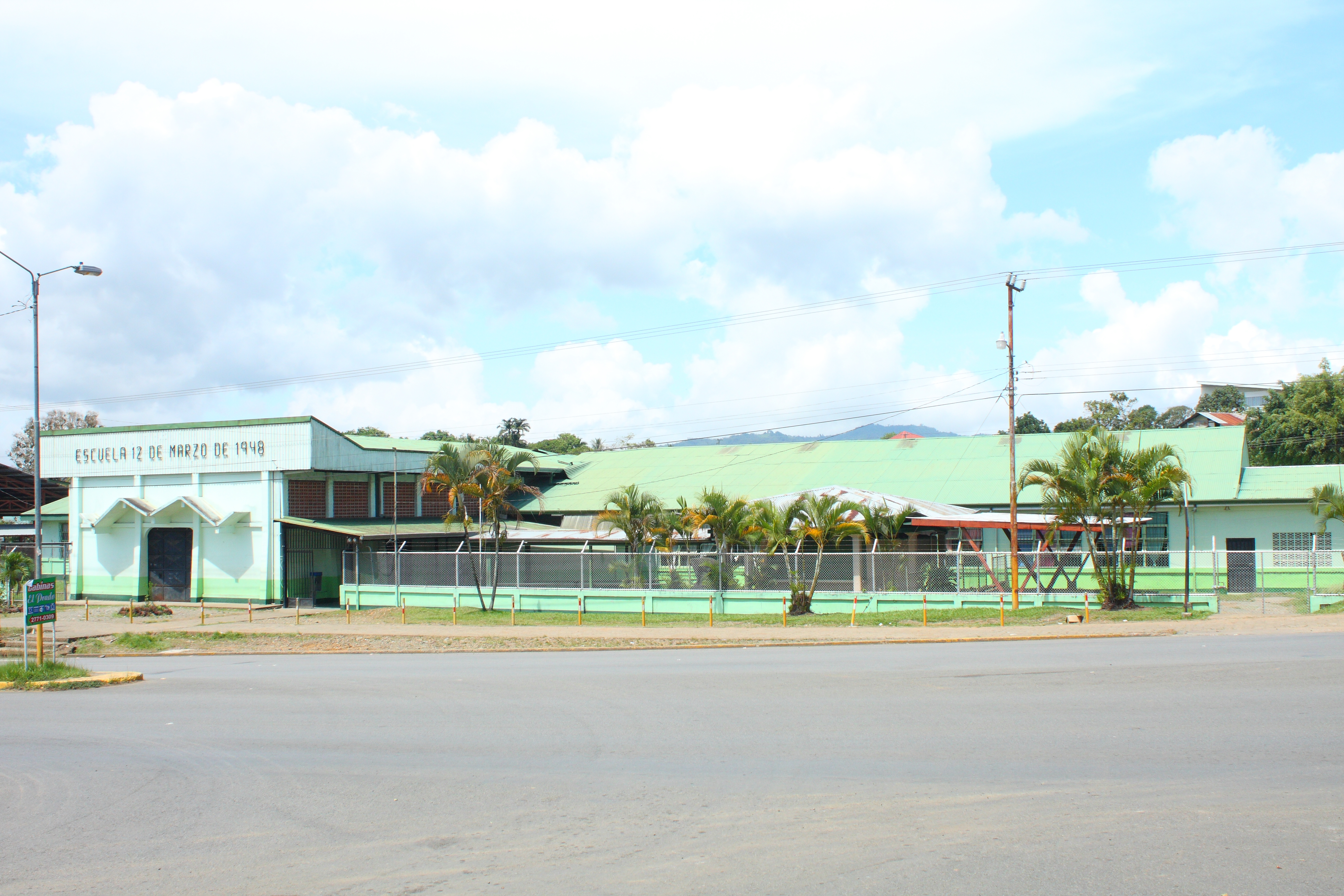
12 de Marzo School, San Isidro de El General, Pérez Zeledón

The first elementary school in Pérez Zeledón was established during Ascensión Esquivel Ibarra's government (1902–1906). It was called Escuela Mixta de Ureña. It was in the Ureña district, south of San Isidro de El General's central park. After the Costa Rican Civil War, the school was moved to a new building 100 meters past San Isidro de El General's main entrance. It currently serves under the name "Escuela 12 de Marzo", in honor of the start of the Costa Rican Civil War (which had just ended when the school was re-inaugurated at its current location).

== Transportation ==
=== Road transportation ===
The following road routes cover the canton:

- National Route 2
- National Route 242
- National Route 243
- National Route 244
- National Route 321
- National Route 322
- National Route 323
- National Route 325
- National Route 326
- National Route 327
- National Route 328
- National Route 329
- National Route 330
- National Route 331
- National Route 332
- National Route 333
- National Route 334
- National Route 335

== Notable people ==
- Juan Gabriel Calderón (born 1987), FIFA football referee
- Keylor Navas (born 1986), football goalkeeper
