= National Route 326 (Costa Rica) =

National Road Route in Costa Rica

National Tertiary Route 326
- Ruta nacional terciaria 326

Route information
- Maintained by Ministry of Public Works and Transport
- Length: 18.570 km (11.539 mi)

Location
- Country: Costa Rica
- Provinces: San José

Highway system
- National Road Network of Costa Rica
← Route 325	→ Route 327

National Tertiary Route 326, or just Route 326 (Spanish: Ruta Nacional Terciaria 326, or Ruta 326) is a National Road Route of Costa Rica, located in the San José province.

== Description ==
In San José province, the route covers Pérez Zeledón canton (El General, Cajón districts).
