= Río Nuevo District =

District in Pérez Zeledón canton, San José province, Costa Rica

Río Nuevo
- District
- Río Nuevo district
- Río Nuevo district location in Costa Rica
- Coordinates: 9.4515046°N 83.8698929°W
- Country: Costa Rica
- Province: San José
- Canton: Pérez Zeledón
- Creation: 18 January 1984

Area
  - Total: 240.68 km^{2} (92.93 sq mi)
- Elevation: 720 m (2,360 ft)

Population (2011)
  - Total: 3,061
  - Density: 12.72/km^{2} (32.94/sq mi)
- Time zone: UTC−06:00
- Postal code: 11910

Río Nuevo is a district of the Pérez Zeledón canton, in the San José province of Costa Rica.

== History ==
Río Nuevo was created on 18 January 1984 by Acuerdo Ejecutivo 128.

== Geography ==
Río Nuevo has an area of 240.68 km^{2} and an elevation of 720 metres.

== Demographics ==
Historical population
Census	Pop.	±% p.a.
1984	2,898	—
2000	3,219	+0.66%
2011	3,061	−0.46%
2022	3,941	+2.32%
Source: Instituto Nacional de Estadística y Censos; Centro Centroamericano de Población

For the 2011 census, Río Nuevo had a population of 3,061 inhabitants.

== Transportation ==
=== Road transportation ===
The district is covered by the following road routes:

- National Route 328
