= Paso Canoas =

- Paso Canoas
- Coordinates: 8°32′0″N 82°50′0″W
- Country: Costa Rica; Panama
- Province: Puntarenas; Chiriquí
- Canton: Corredores (CRI)
- District: Barú (PAN)

Population (2005)
  - Total: 9,543 (CRI)
- Postal code: 61003 (CRI)

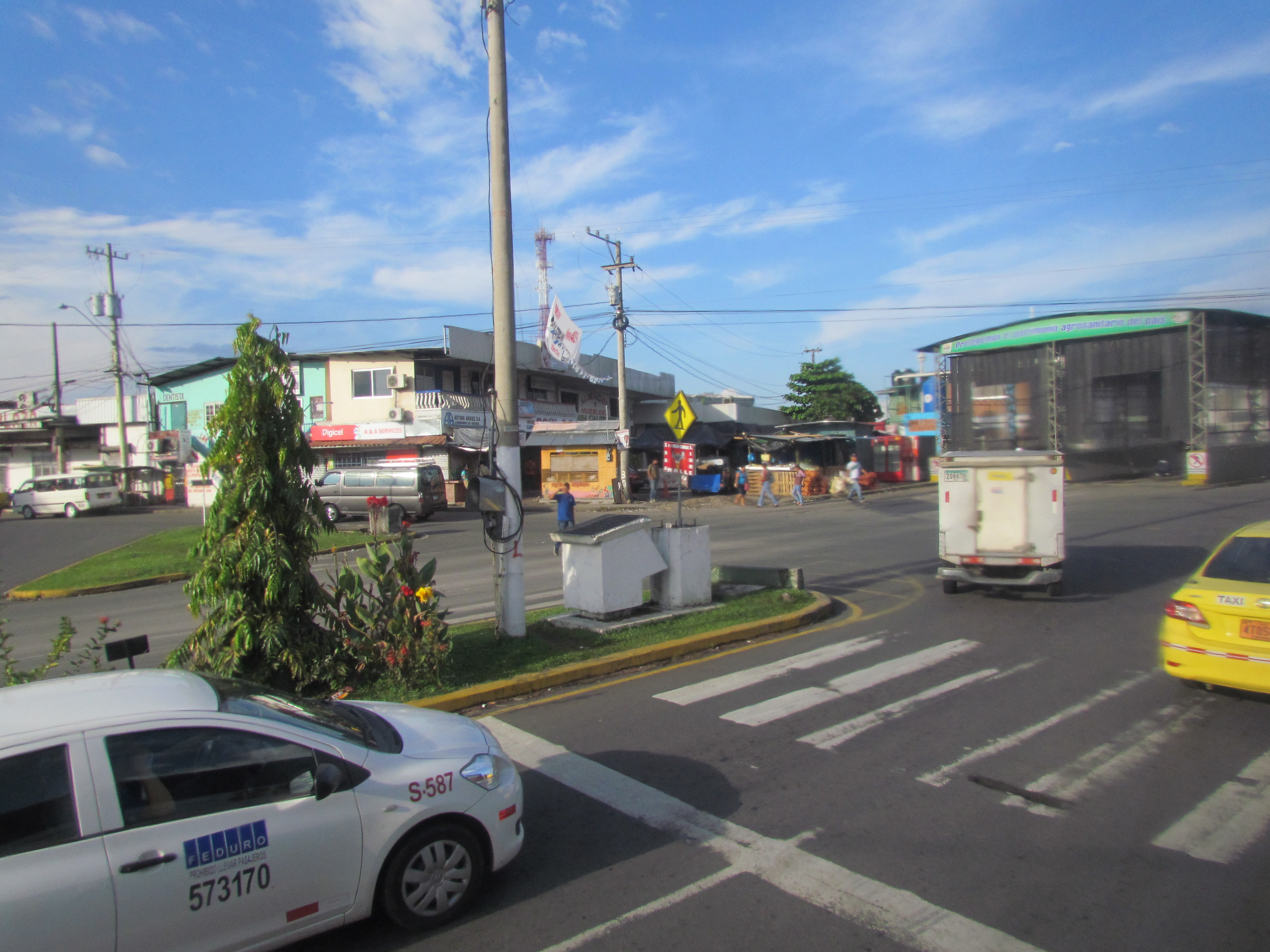
View of Paso Canoas, from the Panamanian side.

Paso Canoas is an international city shared between Puntarenas Province in Costa Rica and Chiriquí Province in the west of Panama. The border between Costa Rica and Panama crosses Paso Canoas from north to south, with the result that the city is both Costa Rican and Panamanian.

In Costa Rica, Paso Canoas is the located in Canoas, the third district of the canton of Corredores, in Puntarenas Province (in the Brunca region in the south of the country).

In Panama, it belongs to the corregimiento of Progreso, in Barú District, Chiriquí.

Because the city is located in a border region, trade is very important for the inhabitants of the area.

== Education ==
Canoas has primary and secondary educational institutions, both private and public. Also, several Costa Rican universities have headquarters in the region: the National University of Costa Rica (Campus Coto) opened a new center for providing public higher education to nearby communities. The Latin University of Costa Rica and the Universidad Metropolitana Castro Carazo are also present in Paso Canoas.

== Health ==
The medical institutions in the area include:

- EBAIS de Paso Canoas
- Hospital de Ciudad Nelly
- Clínica medica de la Cuesta

== Nearby cities ==
=== In Costa Rica ===
- Ciudad Neily (Seat of the canton of Corredores, which includes Paso Canoas)
- La Cuesta
- Laurel
- San Vito
- Río Claro
- Golfito
- San Isidro de El General

=== In Panama ===
- Ciudad de David
- Río Sereno
- Puerto Armuelles
- Concepción
- Progreso
- Bugaba
