= Daniel Flores District =

District in Pérez Zeledón canton, San José province, Costa Rica

Daniel Flores
- District
- Interactive map of Daniel Flores
- Daniel Flores district location in Costa Rica
- Coordinates: 9.3077701°N 83.6591055°W
- Country: Costa Rica
- Province: San José
- Canton: Pérez Zeledón

Area
  - Total: 64.3 km^{2} (24.8 sq mi)
- Elevation: 630 m (2,070 ft)

Population (2011)
  - Total: 33,537
  - Density: 522/km^{2} (1,350/sq mi)
- Time zone: UTC−06:00
- Postal code: 11903

Daniel Flores is a district of the Pérez Zeledón canton, in the San José province of Costa Rica.

== Geography ==
Daniel Flores has an area of 64.3 km^{2} and an elevation of 630 metres.

== Demographics ==
Historical population
Census	Pop.	±% p.a.
1927	540	—
1950	4,252	+9.39%
1963	3,407	−1.69%
1973	5,527	+4.96%
1984	13,069	+8.14%
2000	26,359	+4.48%
2011	33,537	+2.21%
2022	46,344	+2.98%
Source: Instituto Nacional de Estadística y Censos; Centro Centroamericano de Población

As of the 2011 census, Daniel Flores had a population of 33,537 inhabitants.

== Transportation ==
=== Road transportation ===
The district is covered by the following road routes:

- National Route 2
- National Route 242
- National Route 244
- National Route 321
- National Route 334
