= National Route 321 (Costa Rica) =

National Road Route in Costa Rica

National Tertiary Route 321
- Ruta nacional terciaria 321

Route information
- Maintained by Ministry of Public Works and Transport
- Length: 3.135 km (1.948 mi)

Location
- Country: Costa Rica
- Provinces: San José

Highway system
- National Road Network of Costa Rica
← Route 320	→ Route 322

National Tertiary Route 321, or just Route 321 (Spanish: Ruta Nacional Terciaria 321, or Ruta 321) is a National Road Route of Costa Rica, located in the San José province.

== Description ==
In San José province the route covers Pérez Zeledón canton (El General, Daniel Flores districts).
