= Platanares =

District in Pérez Zeledón canton, San José province, Costa Rica

- District
- Platanares district
- Platanares district location in Costa Rica
- Coordinates: 9.1940041°N 83.6487112°W
- Country: Costa Rica
- Province: San José
- Canton: Pérez Zeledón
- Creation: 13 May 1966

Area
  - Total: 79.84 km^{2} (30.83 sq mi)
- Elevation: 865 m (2,838 ft)

Population (2011)
  - Total: 7,203
  - Density: 90.22/km^{2} (233.7/sq mi)
- Time zone: UTC−06:00
- Postal code: 11906

Platanares is a district of the Pérez Zeledón canton, in the San José province of Costa Rica.

== History ==
Platanares was created on 13 May 1966 by an executive decree, Decreto Ejecutivo 2, which segregated it from San Pedro.

== Geography ==
Platanares has an area of 79.84 km^{2} and an elevation of 865 metres.

== Demographics ==
Historical population
Census	Pop.	±% p.a.
1973	5,306	—
1984	5,939	+1.03%
2000	7,308	+1.30%
2011	7,203	−0.13%
2022	6,876	−0.42%
Source: Instituto Nacional de Estadística y Censos; Centro Centroamericano de Población

The Costa Rica 2011 Census reported that Platanares's population at that time was 7,203.

== Transportation ==
=== Road transportation ===
The district is covered by the following road routes:

- National Route 244
- National Route 329
