= San Isidro de El General =

District in Pérez Zeledón canton, San José province, Costa Rica

- District
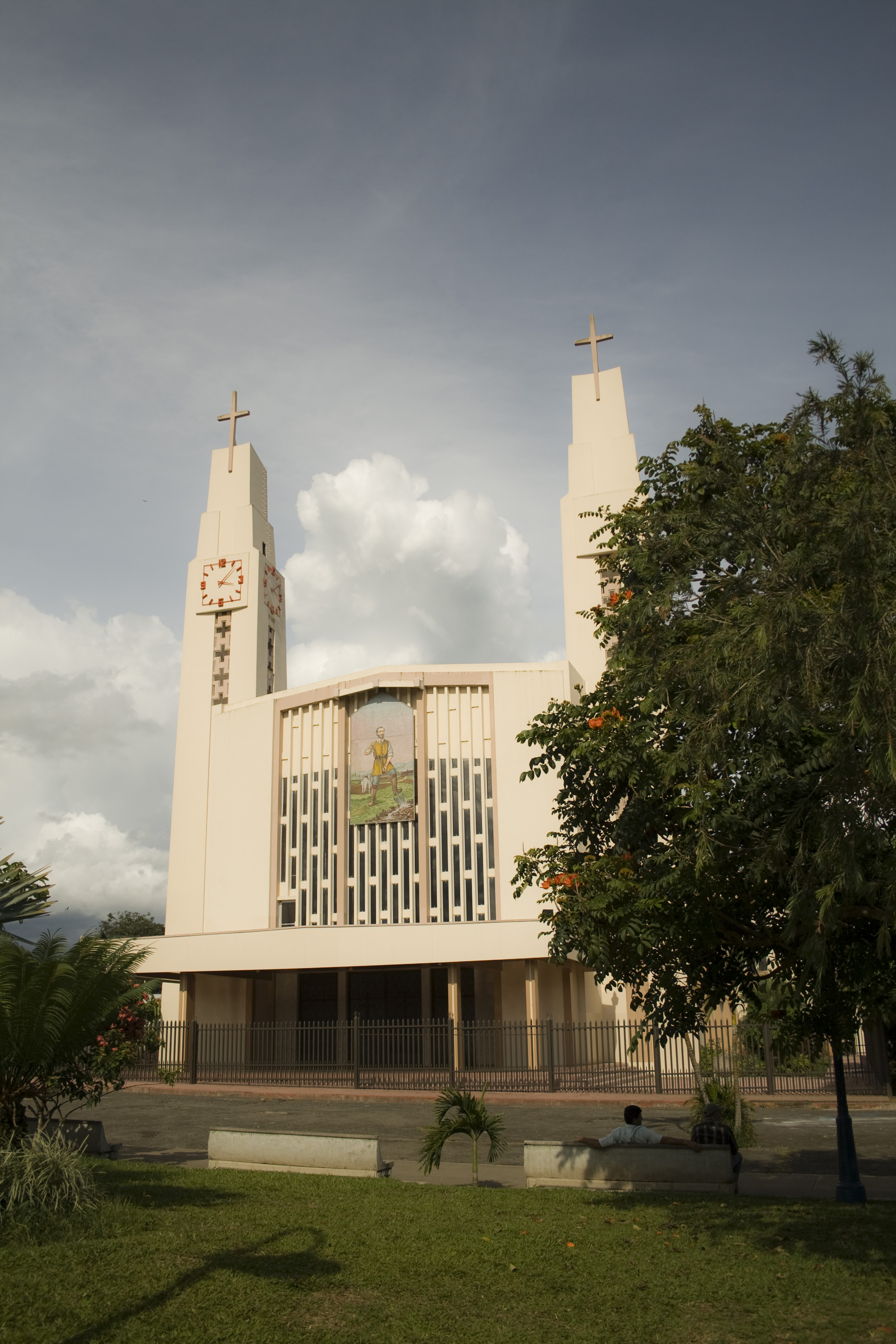
- Central Church of San Isidro de El General
- San Isidro de El General district
- San Isidro de El General district location in Costa Rica
- Coordinates: 9.3403459°N 83.7337922°W
- Country: Costa Rica
- Province: San José
- Canton: Pérez Zeledón
- Creation: c. 1892

Area
  - Total: 191.53 km^{2} (73.95 sq mi)
- Elevation: 702 m (2,303 ft)

Population (2011)
  - Total: 45,327
  - Density: 236.66/km^{2} (612.94/sq mi)
- Demonym: Generaleño/a
- Time zone: UTC−06:00
- Postal code: 11901

San Isidro de El General (Spanish pronunciation: [san iˈsiðɾo ðe el xeneˈɾal]) is the first district of the canton of Pérez Zeledón, in the southern part of the province of San José in Costa Rica, as well as the name of said district's main city.

San Isidro de El General is the most populous city in the Brunca region. It is located at 130 km from San José and 212 km from Paso Canoas, a border town with Panama.

== Geography ==
San Isidro de El General has an area of 191.53 km^{2} and an elevation of 702 metres.

== Demographics ==
Historical population
Census	Pop.	±% p.a.
1927	1,199	—
1950	11,956	+10.52%
1963	23,831	+5.45%
1973	32,929	+3.29%
1984	28,261	−1.38%
2000	41,221	+2.39%
2011	45,327	+0.87%
2022	45,324	−0.00%
Source: Instituto Nacional de Estadística y Censos; Centro Centroamericano de Población

For the 2011 census, San Isidro de El General had a population of 45,327 inhabitants. Much of the population is Catholic.

== Transportation ==
=== Road transportation ===
The district is covered by the following road routes:

- National Route 2
- National Route 242
- National Route 243
- National Route 325
- National Route 328
- National Route 334

== Culture ==
=== Music ===
The Escuela de Música Sinfónica de Pérez Zeledón (Symphonic Music School of Pérez Zeledón) is located in the district. This institution is sponsored by the National University of Costa Rica through its Brunca region campus. The National University developed the idea in 1992 and by holding several fundraisers were able to establish the school; it was inaugurated in 1994 with forty students and five teachers.

At present, the school is located in a wooden building borrowed from the municipal government. With 12 teachers and 22 teaching assistants, the public school of symphony serves a population of 180 students from ages 5 to 24. Music professionals graduated from this school have become music teachers in the region. Consequently, this project and music itself has helped improve the quality of life of young people.

=== Cultural center ===
The city also harbors a cultural complex which serves various purposes for a number of activities such as music concerts and theatrical plays.

=== Public library ===
Adjacent to the cultural complex building is the city's public library, which serves as the headquarters of an organization which groups the region's writers. The library is also home to two municipal art schools.

== Sports ==
The city's major football club is Municipal Pérez Zeledón, which plays at the Estadio Municipal Pérez Zeledón. It shares the stadium with AS Puma Generaleña.

== Notable people ==
- Keylor Navas, football goalkeeper

== Climate ==
Climate data for San Isidro (1982–1994)
Month	Jan	Feb	Mar	Apr	May	Jun	Jul	Aug	Sep	Oct	Nov	Dec	Year
Mean daily maximum °C (°F)	29.0 (84.2)	30.4 (86.7)	31.0 (87.8)	29.9 (85.8)	28.4 (83.1)	27.9 (82.2)	27.6 (81.7)	27.7 (81.9)	27.6 (81.7)	27.2 (81.0)	27.1 (80.8)	27.6 (81.7)	28.5 (83.2)
Mean daily minimum °C (°F)	15.9 (60.6)	16.3 (61.3)	17.0 (62.6)	18.1 (64.6)	18.6 (65.5)	18.6 (65.5)	18.0 (64.4)	18.1 (64.6)	18.2 (64.8)	17.9 (64.2)	17.9 (64.2)	16.8 (62.2)	17.6 (63.7)
Average precipitation mm (inches)	28.1 (1.11)	26.5 (1.04)	30.1 (1.19)	127.6 (5.02)	327.4 (12.89)	285.7 (11.25)	297.2 (11.70)	373.7 (14.71)	419.5 (16.52)	468.6 (18.45)	264.5 (10.41)	79.8 (3.14)	2,728.7 (107.43)
Source: World Meteorological Organization
