= Brunca =

Socioeconomic region in Costa Rica with diverse landscape

Cantons in the Brunca Region

The Brunca Region is one of six socioeconomic regions in Costa Rica. It has a varied landscape, ranging from the coasts to interior mountains.

This region is bordered by Panama to the east, the Pacific Ocean to the south and west. The Brunca Region consists of the cantons of Osa, Golfito, Corredores, Coto, and Buenos Aires in the provinces of Puntarenas and Perez Zeledon in the San José Province.

The area of the Brunca Region is 9,528 square kilometers (3,679 square miles). As of 1997, the region was estimated to have a population of 320,863 people.

The name "Brunca" comes from the Brunca people, who are indigenous to Costa Rica.
