= San Pedro District, Pérez Zeledón =

District in Pérez Zeledón canton, San José province, Costa Rica

San Pedro
- District
- San Pedro district
- San Pedro district location in Costa Rica
- Coordinates: 9.327144°N 83.5007674°W
- Country: Costa Rica
- Province: San José
- Canton: Pérez Zeledón
- Creation: 5 October 1951

Area
  - Total: 205.96 km^{2} (79.52 sq mi)
- Elevation: 585 m (1,919 ft)

Population (2011)
  - Total: 9,102
  - Density: 44.19/km^{2} (114.5/sq mi)
- Time zone: UTC−06:00
- Postal code: 11905

San Pedro is a district of the Pérez Zeledón canton, in the San José province of Costa Rica. It is located 30 kilometers south of San Isidro de El General.

== History ==
San Pedro, a district of historical significance, was established on 5 October 1951 by Ley 1360, Anexa de Buenos Aires.

== Geography ==
San Pedro has an area of 205.96 km^{2} and an elevation of 585 metres.

== Demographics ==
Historical population
Census	Pop.	±% p.a.
1950	2,073	—
1963	15,322	+16.63%
1973	3,682	−13.29%
1984	5,581	+3.85%
2000	9,013	+3.04%
2011	9,102	+0.09%
2022	10,844	+1.60%
Source: Instituto Nacional de Estadística y Censos; Centro Centroamericano de Población

For the 2011 census, San Pedro had a population of 9,102 inhabitants.

== Towns ==
Zapotal, La Arenilla, Unión, Tambor, Cedral (parte), Fátima, Fortuna, Cristo Rey, Guaria, Santo Domingo, Santa Ana, San Rafael, Laguna, Rinconada Vega, San Juancito, San Juan, San Jerónimo.

== Economy ==
San Pedro, a district nestled on the slopes of the Chirripó National Park, is a picturesque blend of coffee plantations, tourist spots, and agricultural activities.

Due to its area of 209.31 km2, San Pedro is the third district in territorial extension. San Pedro is a district where community development is a shared responsibility.

Regarding production, its inhabitants dedicate themselves to raising and caring for milk and fattening cattle. Agriculture also occupies an important place, and coffee, although with its unstable prices, continues to be a useful income for many families, who earn a little money with the harvesting of the grain.

Another of the projects that stand out in this district is the construction of the Liceo San Pedro, which, in its first years of being founded, earned the title of the best in academic performance. This is a source of pride for its inhabitants and neighbors in general.

The tourist part can not go unnoticed either. Although it is not extensive, the foothills of the Chirripó National Park have become an attraction for the district.

The improvement in road infrastructure is notable; the ballast looks in better condition, and the street is paved from the Interamerican Highway to the population center.

Among the pioneers, Don Severiano Mora, a native of Poás de Aserrí, is remembered. He arrived in Pérez Zeledón from Acosta on October 22, 1946. He lived in La Trocha de Palmares, then in Los Chiles, and then left for San Pedro. Mora fought for this district to have electric light, and when the water used for consumption arrived, it was taken from a ditch.

== Transportation ==
=== Road transportation ===
The following road routes cover the district:

- National Route 2
- National Route 327
- National Route 333
