= National Road Network of Costa Rica =

Highway system

National Road Network Red Vial Nacional
- National Primary, Secondary and Tertiary Routes shield examples.

- Map of the routes as of May 2020.

System information
- Maintained by Ministry of Public Works and Transport
- Length: 35,330 km (21,950 mi)
- Formed: 1948

Highway names
- Ruta 1..39: National Primary Route
- Ruta 100..257: National Secondary Route
- Ruta 301..939: National Tertiary Route

System links
- National Road Network of Costa Rica

National Road Network of Costa Rica (Spanish: Red Vial Nacional), are a series of numbered road routes that are managed through Costa Rica by the Ministry of Public Works and Transport (MOPT) and its subagency the National Road Council (Conavi).

According to the Inter-American Development Bank, in 2019 Costa Rica had the worst road network in Latin America, due to it being undermaintained, and having structural defects and deterioration in around 49% of the National Primary Routes network. Other countries in the area report an average of 20% in the same metric.

There are no high speed express routes but there are some two-lane trunk roads. Potholes are common in primary road routes. Many of the secondary or tertiary road routes are made of gravel or dirt.

== Legal definitions ==
- Primary roads (Spanish: Carreteras Primarias): Are those that connect the main roads in the Greater Metropolitan Area and provide a link between mainly the urban centers (head cities of main cantons), airports, and industrial, commercial or recreative zones of national importance.
- Secondary roads (Spanish: Carreteras Secundarias): Are those that link the main urban centers of the Greater Metropolitan Area, which are not linked by primary roads.
- Tertiary roads (Spanish: Carreteras Terciarias): Are those that collect traffic bound for primary or secondary routes, as well as a link between urban centers of second order (head cities of small cantons and big districts).
- Traverse routes (Spanish: Rutas de Travesía): A group of national public roads that traverse the quadrant of an urban area, or streets that link two sections of a national road. They were created to expedite the traffic in city centers. (By Article 3, Law 5060).
- Cantonal road network (Spanish: Red vial cantonal): Is the network of public roads, streets, avenues, diagonals and transversals (calles, avenidas, diagonales, transversales, respectively in Spanish) that are not part of the National Road Network, their administration is responsibility of the local government (municipality) of each canton. They are not numbered at the national level, but are named either by given names or with numerical values, which might be used by another canton as well.

== See also ==
- Transport in Costa Rica
- List of national routes of Costa Rica
