= Ministry of Public Works and Transport (Costa Rica) =

Government ministry of Costa Rica

- Ministerio de Obras Públicas y Transporte
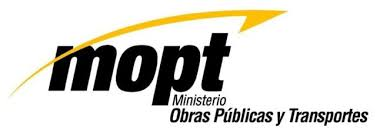
- MOPT Logo

Agency overview
- Formed: May 8, 1948; 78 years ago
- Jurisdiction: Costa Rica
- Headquarters: Avenida 20 and 22, Calle 9, Barrio González Víquez, Catedral, 10104, San José (Costa Rica); 9.924341°N 84.075805°W
- Employees: 3,220 (2008)
- Annual budget: CRC ₡ 231,023,000,000 (2009)
- Agency executive: Rodolfo Méndez Mata, Minister
- Child agencies: Consejo Nacional de Vialidad; Consejo Técnico de Aviación Civil; Consejo de Transporte Público; Consejo Nacional de Concesiones; Consejo de Seguridad Vial

The Ministry of Public Works and Transport (MOPT) is an agency of the government of Costa Rica in charge of roads, airports and maritime ports planning and construction, it also regulates public transportation.

== History ==
On October 20, 1860, the Dirección General de Obras Públicas (Public Works General Directorate) was created.

On May 8, 1948, after the civil war, the transitional government created the agency as the Ministry of Public Works, then on August 5, 1963 it is renamed as Ministry of Transport, and on July 5, 1971 gets its final name as Ministry of Public Works and Transport.
