= List of Costa Rican models =

This is a list of notable Costa Rican models.

== Male models ==
- Alonso Fernández Alvarez
- Rafael Rojas

== Female models ==
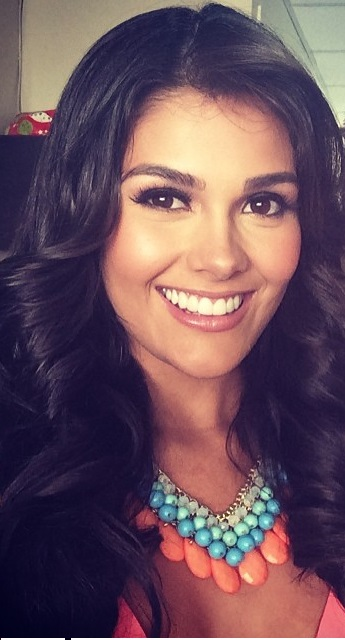
Fabiana Granados who was crowned Miss Costa Rica 2013 and represented her country at Miss Universe 2013

- Anastasia Acosta
- Brenda Castro
- Fabiana Granados
- Leonora Jiménez
- Leila Rodríguez Stahl
- Natalia Carvajal
- Wendy Cordero
- Carolina Coto Segnini
- Johanna Fernández
- Johanna Solano
- Maribel Guardia
- Mariluz Bermúdez
- Karina Ramos
- Bali Rodríguez

== See also ==
- List of Costa Ricans
- Miss Costa Rica
