= Dominical, Puntarenas =

Dominical
- Town
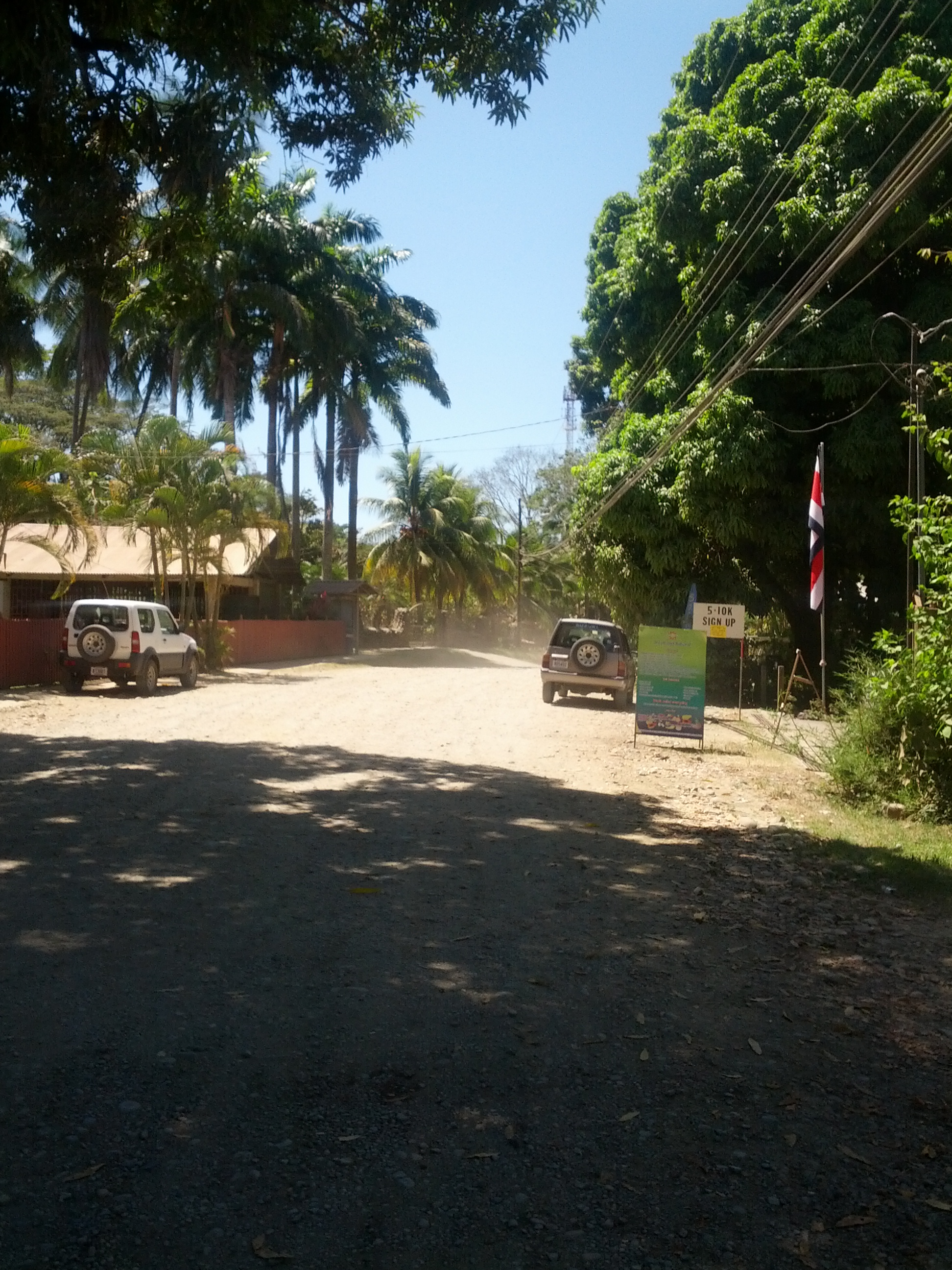
- Road along the beach side in Dominical Costa Rica

- Location in Costa Rica
- Coordinates: 09°15′N 83°52′W
- Country: Costa Rica
- Province: Puntarenas
- Canton: Osa

Dominical is a beach-front town in Bahía Ballena District, of the Osa canton in the province of Puntarenas in Costa Rica, approximately 45 km south of Quepos. It is well known for large, year-round waves and is popular among surfers in Costa Rica. The town began as a small fishing village but has since grown into a tourist attraction, most notably for surfers.

Accessible from the capital San José, it can be reached via San Isidro de El General through Route 243 to the east or down the coast from Quepos through Route 34 (Costanera Sur). Although similar in distance, the trip down the coast is much faster due to the winding nature of the inland route. The area between Quepos and Dominical is dotted with African oil palm plantations producing palm oil. Farther south are the villages of Uvita, Ojochal, and Coronado on the Route 34.
