= National Route 34 (Costa Rica) =

Highway in Costa Rica

National Primary Route 34
- Ruta nacional primaria 34
- Carretera Pacífica Fernández Oreamuno; Carretera Costanera Sur
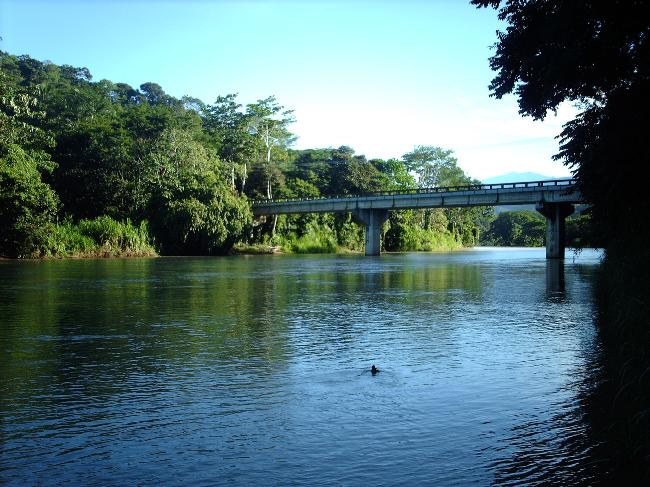

Route information
- Maintained by Ministry of Public Works and Transport
- Length: 210.675 km (130.907 mi)

Major junctions
- West end: Route 27
- Route 239; Route 235 (Quepos); Route 243; Route 168 (Ciudad Cortés)
- East end: Route 2

Location
- Country: Costa Rica
- Provinces: Alajuela, Puntarenas

Highway system
- National Road Network of Costa Rica
← Route 32	→ Route 35

National Primary Route 34, official name Carretera Pacífica Fernández Oreamuno (after Pacífica Fernández Oreamuno), and popularly known as Carretera Costanera Sur (South Coastal Drive), or just Route 34 (Spanish: Ruta Nacional Primaria 34, or Ruta 34), is a National Road Route and scenic route of Costa Rica, located in the Alajuela, Puntarenas provinces that connects Route 27 and Route 2 mostly along the central and south Pacific coast of the country, and is the recommended route over the Pan-American Highway when traveling between the south of the country to the Greater Metropolitan Area.

== Description ==
Starting north, an interchange in the town of Pozón, Orotina at Route 27 is the starting point, which continues south towards the beach town of Jacó. Then to the east to Parrita and Quepos, which provides access to Manuel Antonio National Park. Continuing to the east there is the interchange with Route 243 near Dominical beach and then the land area of the Ballena National Marine Park, and finishing at the interchange with Route 2.

In Alajuela province the route covers Orotina canton (Coyolar district).

In Puntarenas province the route covers Osa canton (Puerto Cortés, Palmar, and Bahía Ballena districts), Quepos canton (Quepos and Savegre districts), Parrita canton (Parrita district), and Garabito canton (Jacó and Tárcoles districts).

== History ==
The project for Route 34 started in 1978, with the proposal to provide better access to the coastal towns, particularly Jacó, Parrita and Quepos, due to the banana production of the area and then oil palm. It would also provide a flatter access to the south of the country than Route 2 through Cerro de la Muerte.

In 1983 the asphalt road was finished between Parrita and Quepos, but it wasn't until April 29th 2010 that the entirety of the road was finished, with the missing segment between Quepos and Dominical paved.

Due to the low urbanization in the area, there are a lot of wildlife accidents along this route.

=== Damage on Coronado River bridge ===
Since 2017 erosion and loosening of the foundations of the bridge over Coronado river at Kilometre 179 (9.051751°N 83.619591°W) has been noticed, putting the bridge at risk, on 15 August 2020, the bridge was closed and traffic rerouted around the area through San Isidro de El General, using Route 243 and Route 2.
