= List of lighthouses in Costa Rica =

This is a list of lighthouses in Costa Rica.

== Lighthouses ==
Name	Image	Year built	Location & coordinates	Class of Light	Focal height	NGA number	Admiralty number	Range nml
Bahia Moin Lighthouse	Image	n/a	Isla Pajaros; Limón; 10°01′06.0″N 83°04′36.3″W	Fl W 2.5s.	20 metres (66 ft)	16516	J6067	n/a
Cabo Matapalo Lighthouse		n/a	Cabo Matapalo; 8°22′47.6″N 83°17′36.6″W	Fl W 10s.	n/a	15649	G3282	n/a
Isla del Caño Lighthouse		1940 est.	Osa; 8°42′22.1″N 83°53′23.1″W	Fl W 4s.	63 metres (207 ft)	15468	G3306	12
Isla Herradura Lighthouse	Image	n/a	Puntarenas; 9°37′39.5″N 84°40′29.8″W	Fl (4) W 10s.	99 metres (325 ft)	15460	G3316	15
Isla Uvita Lighthouse		1891	Limón (canton); 9°59′41.7″N 83°00′45.1″W	Fl W 10s.	41 metres (135 ft)	16504	J6068	5
Puerto Limòn Lighthouse	Image	n/a	Limón (canton); 9°59′20.3″N 83°01′12.4″W	Fl R 1.5s.	15 metres (49 ft)	16508	J6069	10
Punta Curupacha Lighthouse		n/a	Puntarenas Province; 8°38′06.2″N 83°12′35.1″W	Fl W 4s.	91 metres (299 ft)	15472	G3284	12
Punta de Puntarenas Lighthouse		2014	Puntarenas; 9°58′36.0″N 84°51′04.0″W	Q (2) W 5s.	17 metres (56 ft)			
Punta Quepos Lighthouse		2010	Quepos; 9°23′51.5″N 84°10′32.8″W	Fl W 3s.	156 metres (512 ft)	15464	G3310	8
Sixaola Lighthouse		n/a	Sixaola; 9°34′31.1″N 82°34′08.0″W	Fl W 10s.	14 metres (46 ft)	16527	J6072	11

== See also ==
- Lists of lighthouses and lightvessels
