= Playa Herradura, Costa Rica =

Town in Costa Rica

Coordinates: 9.659748°N 84.634638°W

Playa Herradura
- Town
- Location in Costa Rica
- Country: Costa Rica
- Province: Puntarenas
- Canton: Garabito
- Time zone: UTC-6 (Costa Rica Standard Time)

Playa Herradura (Herradura Beach) is a coastal town in the Central Pacific Region of Costa Rica. It is located about 4 kilometres (2.5 mi) north of Jacó in the Garabito canton of Puntarenas Province.

It is located one hour from the Juan Santamaría International Airport (SJO) in San José, Costa Rica's primary international airport.

The name Herradura refers to the horseshoe shape of the bay.

The town has developed into an important tourist destination in Costa Rica.

The Marina is home to the largest fleet of Sports fishing boats in the country.
