= Lisbeth Valverde =

Costa Rican model (born 1995)

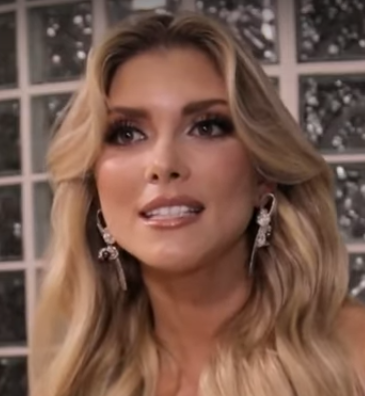
- Born: 13 April 1995 (age 31); Uvita, Costa Rica
- Occupation: Model
- Height: 1.72 m (5 ft 7 1/2 in)
- Beauty pageant titleholder
- Title: Miss Costa Rica 2023
- Major competitions: Miss Costa Rica 2023 (Winner); Miss Universe 2023 (Unplaced)

Lisbeth Valverde (born 13 April 1995) is a Costa Rican model and beauty pageant titleholder who was crowned Miss Costa Rica 2023 and represented her country at Miss Universe 2023 pageant. Valverde holds a record of several international contests.

== Background ==
=== Early life ===
Valverde was born on 13 April 1995, in San Ramón de Alajuela, but later moved to Uvita de Osa, in Puntarenas. She is the youngest in the family of four children. She has two brothers and a sister. When she was a child, her parents migrated from the South to the West, specifically to Palmares, looking for a way to improve their economic condition. Her father worked as a farmer and her mother was a cleaner, cook and sold meals. When she was three years old, her parents decided to separate and that changed the dynamics of the family.

Her father returned to the South Zone with her siblings, and she stayed with her mother in San Ramón, which made her brothers and her grow up separately. Her father died in an accident at home in San Vito, while working on a piece of wood with a machine that electrocuted him.

Valverde began modelling at the age of 16 years. Her sister, now a journalist, was working for a media outlet in which she interviewed the organizer of a beauty pageant, then he told Valverde to participate.

=== Education ===
Valverde graduated from the Universidad Nacional de Costa Rica in Heredia, Costa Rica.

== Pageantry ==
=== Miss Costa Rica ===
The Miss Costa Rica 2023 journey began on Tuesday, October 3, 2023. In some of her stories she documented that she arrived at El Dorado International Airport in Bogotá and that everything flowed smoothly. She also posted a series of photos on Instagram in which she thanked her boyfriend, entrepreneur Travis Cones, for supporting her in every adventure. "May God accompany my journey to Colombia and allow me to take advantage, learn and share with wonderful people who join my dream," said the model.

=== Miss Universe 2023 ===
Valverde was crowned on the night of August 16, 2023, after having prepared since she was 16 years old in beauty pageants. Before Miss Costa Rica, she participated in a dozen pageants. She will represent Costa Rica at the 72nd Miss Universe competition to be held in El Salvador on November 18, 2023.

=== Other pageants ===
On July 26, 2019 she represented Costa Rica at Reina de la Costa Maya 2019 and competed against eight other candidates at the Honorable Louis Sylvestre Sporting Complex in San Pedro, Belize in which she won the title. On November 2, 2019, she represented Costa Rica at Miss Panamerican International 2019 and competed against 15 other candidates at the Palace of Culture and Communication (PALCCO) in Zapopan, Mexico. On August 16, 2023, she competed against eight other Miss Costa Rica 2023 candidates at the Estudio Marco Picado of Teletica in San José, Costa Rica and won the title.

== Prizes ==
Among the prizes received by Valverde are the silver crown with blue Swarovski crystals that represents the waves of the sea. The jewel is the work of designer and goldsmith George Bakkar. In addition, she will receive a car of the year and ₡3 million in cash. A collection of shoes, evening dresses, dental and dermatological care, among other.

== Personal life ==
Valverde is in a relationship with Travis Cones.

Awards and achievements
Preceded by María Fernanda Rodríguez	Miss Costa Rica; 2023	Succeeded by Elena Hidalgo
