= Cabo Matapalo =

Village in Puntarenas Province, Costa Rica

Cabo Matapalo Lighthouse
- Location: Cabo Matapalo, Costa Rica
- Coordinates: 8°22′48″N 83°17′37″W

Tower
- Construction: metal
- Shape: square pyramid
- Power source: solar power

Light
- Characteristic: Fl W 10s

Cabo Matapalo is a village located at the outermost point of the Osa Peninsula in the southern Pacific coastal area of Costa Rica. The village is located in the Puntarenas Province.

Cabo Matapalo is a small beach community on the Osa Peninsula that is approximately 30-40 minutes south of Puerto Jimenez, the nearest major town. The village is 700 square miles (1,813 square kilometers) large.

== Nature ==
The Matapalo area is recognized for its sustainability initiatives, as most of the lodges and cabins rely on solar energy. The beaches in the area received the Blue Ecological Flag for not disturbing the nature of the area surrounding Matapalo and minimizing the carbon footprint of those visiting and living in the area. The Playa Matapalo area includes secluded, untouched beaches with abundant plant life and animal activity, including howler monkeys and various birds. Cabo Matapalo is also home to tourist attractions such as Corcovado National Park, King Louis Waterfall, and Canilooeters Island, an island 20 km off the mainland used mainly for fishing.

There is an active lighthouse on the point.

== See also ==
- List of lighthouses in Costa Rica
