= Naranjito de Aguirre =

- District and village
- Location in Costa Rica
- Coordinates: 09°28′27″N 84°06′20″W
- Country: Costa Rica
- Province: Puntarenas
- Canton: Quepos

Government

Area
  - Total: 104.64 km^{2} (40.40 sq mi)

Population (January 2013)
  - Total: 3,927
  - Density: 37.53/km^{2} (97.20/sq mi)
- Postal code: 60603

Naranjito de Aguirre is a village and district in the canton of Quepos, Puntarenas Province in Costa Rica.

The district has a population of about 4,000 people.

== Villages ==
Administrative center of the district is the town of Naranjito.

Other villages are Bijagual, Buenos Aires, Capital, Concepción, Cotos, Londres, Negro, Pascua, Paso Indios, Paso Real, Sábalo, Santa Juana, Tacorí and Villanueva.
