= Caña blanca =

Caña blanca may refer to:

- Caña blanca, a sugarcane liquor considered the national liquor of Paraguay
- Osa Wildlife Sanctuary, also known as Caña Blanca Wildlife Sanctuary, a defunct Costa Rican wildlife sanctuary

== See also ==
- Cane (grass)
- Sugarcane
