= Isla del Caño =

Island and biological reserve off the southwest coast of Costa Rica

Caño Island Biological Reserve
- Reserva Biológica Isla del Caño
- IUCN category Ia (strict nature reserve)
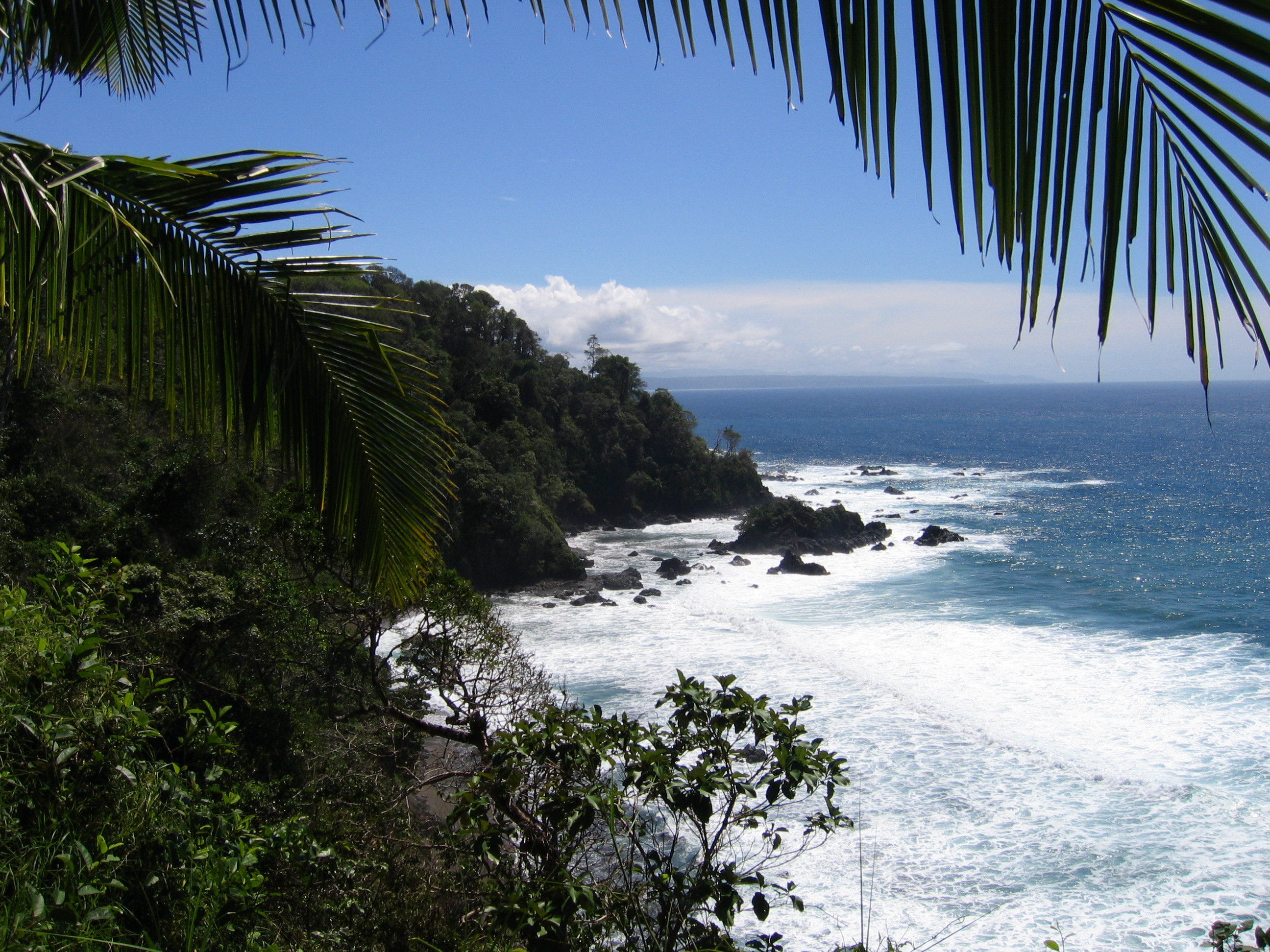
- View from Caño Island

- Location within Costa Rica
- Location: Costa Rica
- Coordinates: 8.709°N 83.874°W
- Area: 3.26 square kilometres (1.26 sq mi) (terrestrial), 52.01 square kilometres (20.08 sq mi) (marine)
- Established: 30 September 1976
- Governing body: National System of Conservation Areas (SINAC)
Caño Island
Native name: Isla del Caño
- Interactive map of Caño Island
Geography
- Area: 3.2 km^{2} (1.2 sq mi)
- Highest elevation: 110 m (360 ft)
Administration
- Costa Rica
- Province: Puntarenas
- Canton: Osa
- District: Bahía Drake
Demographics
- Population: 0

Isla del Caño Lighthouse
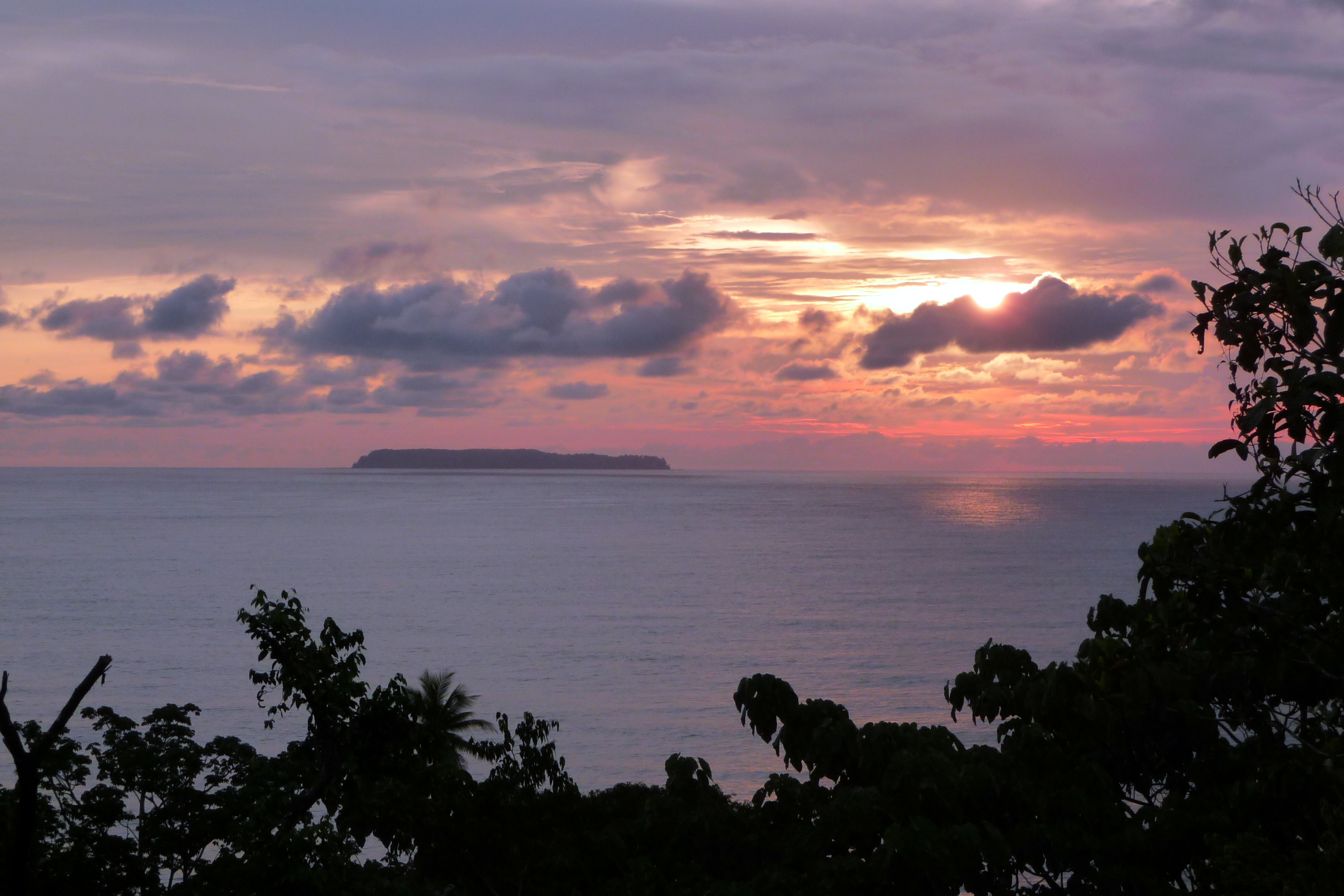
- Location: Isla del Caño; Osa; Costa Rica
- Coordinates: 8°42′22.1″N 83°53′23.1″W

Tower
- Constructed: 1940 (first)
- Construction: steel skeletal tower
- Height: 22 metres (72 ft)
- Shape: square pyramidal skeletal tower
- Markings: red lantern
- Power source: solar power
- Operator: Reserva Biológica Isla del Caño

Light
- Focal height: 63 metres (207 ft)
- Range: 12 nautical miles (22 km; 14 mi)
- Characteristic: Fl W 4s.

Caño Island (Spanish: Isla del Caño) is a small island and biological reserve in the Bahia de Corcovado (Corcovado Bay) in Osa, Costa Rica. It is on the Pacific Ocean side of Costa Rica, 10 miles (16 km) west of Punta Llorona on Península de Osa. It rises steeply to a flat top of 123 metres (404 ft) in height.

== Biological reserve ==
Caño Island Biological Reserve (Spanish: Reserva Biológica Isla del Caño), is a protected area in Costa Rica, managed under the Osa Conservation Area, it was created in 1976 by decree 6385-A.

The island and surrounding marine area of 52.01 square kilometres (20.08 sq mi) has been established as a biological reserve, with a permanent ranger station on the island. It is a popular tourist destination for ecotourism such as whale watching, attracting visitors for its beaches, coral beds, and sea life. Researchers currently use the coral beds to study the factors surrounding coral death and recolonization. Marine life includes manta rays, dolphins, false killer whales, sea turtles, whales, a wide variety of fish, and possibly manatees as well. The nudibranch Mexichromis tica was described from here and Darwin Island on the Galápagos Islands in 2004. The limited diversity of terrestrial fauna, however, is noticeable, with the island having less than one percent of the insect diversity of the peninsula and an absence of numerous animals native to the nearby mainland.

== Archaeology ==
Evidence of pre-Columbian human activity on the island is substantial, with some of the most interesting artifacts being stone spheres evidently carved by early civilizations.

== See also ==
- Corcovado National Park
- Bahía Drake
- List of lighthouses in Costa Rica
