= National Route 618 (Costa Rica) =

National Road Route in Costa Rica

National Tertiary Route 618
- Ruta nacional terciaria 618

Route information
- Maintained by Ministry of Public Works and Transport
- Length: 6.345 km (3.943 mi)

Location
- Country: Costa Rica
- Provinces: Puntarenas

Highway system
- National Road Network of Costa Rica
← Route 617	→ Route 619

National Tertiary Route 618, or just Route 618 (Spanish: Ruta Nacional Terciaria 618, or Ruta 618) is a National Road Route of Costa Rica, located in the Puntarenas province.

== Description ==
This route is the access road to Manuel Antonio National Park.

In Puntarenas province the route covers Quepos canton (Quepos district).

== Junction list ==
The route is completely within Quepos district.

km	mi	Destinations	Notes
0.0	0.0	Route 235	Southeast of Quepos
6.3	3.9	Entrance to Manuel Antonio National Park	

== History ==
This route was severely damaged in November 2020 due to Hurricane Eta.
