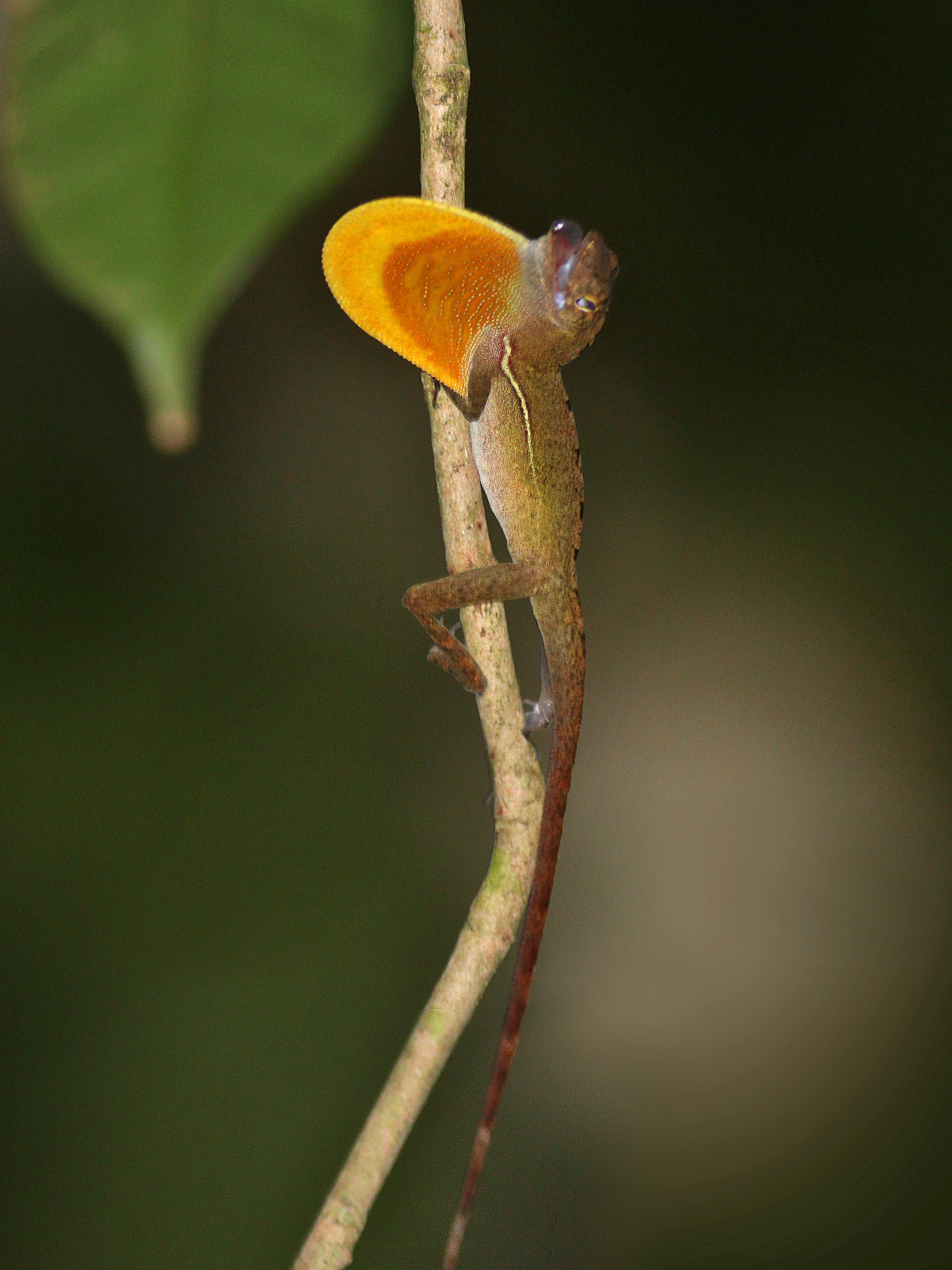

Conservation status
- Least Concern (IUCN 3.1)

Scientific classification
- Kingdom: Animalia
- Phylum: Chordata
- Class: Reptilia
- Order: Squamata
- Suborder: Iguania
- Family: Dactyloidae
- Genus: Anolis
- Species: A. osa

Binomial name
- Anolis osa Köhler, Dehling, & Köhler, 2010

= Anolis osa =

Species of lizard

Anolis osa, the Osa anole, is a species of lizard in the family Dactyloidae. The species is endemic to the Osa Peninsula of Costa Rica.
