= National Route 245 (Costa Rica) =

National Road Route in Costa Rica

National Secondary Route 245
- Ruta nacional secundaria 245

Route information
- Maintained by Ministry of Public Works and Transport
- Length: 117.720 km (73.148 mi)

Location
- Country: Costa Rica
- Provinces: Puntarenas

Highway system
- National Road Network of Costa Rica
← Route 244	→ Route 246

National Secondary Route 245, or just Route 245 (Spanish: Ruta Nacional Secundaria 245, or Ruta 245) is a National Road Route of Costa Rica, located in the Puntarenas province.

== Description ==
In Puntarenas province the route covers Osa canton (Sierpe and Piedras Blancas districts) and Golfito canton (Puerto Jiménez district).
