= National Route 223 (Costa Rica) =

National Road Route in Costa Rica

National Secondary Route 223
- Ruta nacional secundaria 223

Route information
- Maintained by Ministry of Public Works and Transport
- Length: 15.290 km (9.501 mi)

Location
- Country: Costa Rica
- Provinces: Puntarenas

Highway system
- National Road Network of Costa Rica
← Route 222	→ Route 224

National Secondary Route 223, or just Route 223 (Spanish: Ruta Nacional Secundaria 223, or Ruta 223) is a National Road Route of Costa Rica, located in the Puntarenas province.

== Description ==
In Puntarenas province the route covers Osa canton (Palmar and Sierpe districts).
