= Puerto Cortés District =

District in Osa canton, Puntarenas province, Costa Rica

Puerto Cortés
- District
- Puerto Cortés district
- Puerto Cortés district location in Costa Rica
- Coordinates: 9.0220904°N 83.5751163°W
- Country: Costa Rica
- Province: Puntarenas
- Canton: Osa
- Creation: 29 July 1940

Area
  - Total: 230.98 km^{2} (89.18 sq mi)
- Elevation: 6 m (20 ft)

Population (2011)
  - Total: 7,969
  - Density: 34.50/km^{2} (89.36/sq mi)
- Time zone: UTC−06:00
- Postal code: 60501

Puerto Cortés is a district of the Osa canton, in the Puntarenas province of Costa Rica. It is known as the melancholic and historical town of Costa Rica.

== History ==
Puerto Cortés was created on 29 July 1940 by Ley 185.

== Geography ==
Puerto Cortés has an area of 230.98 km^{2} (89.18 sq mi) and an elevation of 6 metres.

== Demographics ==
Historical population
Census	Pop.	±% p.a.
1927	799	—
1950	2,294	+4.69%
1963	5,405	+6.81%
1973	7,467	+3.28%
1984	7,368	−0.12%
2000	6,295	−0.98%
2011	7,969	+2.17%
2022	9,496	+1.61%
Source: Instituto Nacional de Estadística y Censos; Centro Centroamericano de Población

For the 2011 census, Puerto Cortés had a population of 7,969 inhabitants.

== Transportation ==
=== Road transportation ===
The district is covered by the following road routes:

- National Route 34
- National Route 168
