= Palmar District =

District in Osa canton, Puntarenas province, Costa Rica

Palmar
- District
- Palmar district
- Palmar district location in Costa Rica
- Coordinates: 8.9387503°N 83.4249454°W
- Country: Costa Rica
- Province: Puntarenas
- Canton: Osa

Area
  - Total: 250.72 km^{2} (96.80 sq mi)
- Elevation: 26 m (85 ft)

Population (2011)
  - Total: 9,815
  - Density: 39.15/km^{2} (101.4/sq mi)
- Time zone: UTC−06:00
- Postal code: 60502

Palmar is a district of the Osa canton, in the Puntarenas province of Costa Rica.

== Geography ==
Palmar has an area of 250.72 km^{2} (96.80 sq mi) and an elevation of 26 metres.

== Demographics ==
Historical population
Census	Pop.	±% p.a.
1950	7,718	—
1963	8,052	+0.33%
1973	13,660	+5.43%
1984	14,845	+0.76%
2000	9,906	−2.50%
2011	9,815	−0.08%
2022	11,219	+1.22%
Source: Instituto Nacional de Estadística y Censos; Centro Centroamericano de Población

For the 2011 census, Palmar had a population of 9,815 inhabitants.

== Transportation ==
=== Road transportation ===
The district is covered by the following road routes:

- National Route 2
- National Route 34
- National Route 223
