= Coronado Bay =

Body of water on the coast of Costa Rica

Coordinates: 8°58′N 83°49′W

Coronado Bay is a body of water located on the southwestern Pacific coast of Costa Rica. The bay lies to the northwest of the Osa Peninsula.
