= Miss Costa Rica 2019 =

Beauty pageant edition

- Date: July 19, 2019
- Venue: Estudio Marco Picado, La Sabana, Costa Rica
- Broadcaster: Teletica
- Entrants: 9
- Placements: 3
- Winner: Paola Chacón; San José

Miss Costa Rica 2019 was the 64th edition of Miss Costa Rica and was held on July 19, 2019, at the Marco Picado Studio. Natalia Carvajal of Escazú crowned Paola Chacón at the end of the event.

== Results ==
=== Placements ===
Placement	Contestant
Miss Costa Rica 2019	San José – Paola Chacón
1st Runner-Up	Nicoya – Brenda Muñoz
2nd Runner-Up	San José – Monica Zamora

== Judges ==
- Mario Montenegro — national entrepreneur.
- Luis Kaver — renowned national dentist.
- Carolina Rodríguez — Miss Costa Rica 2016
- Karla Blanco — renowned writer
- Ana Gutiérrez — Costa Rican designer.

== Contestants ==
9 contestants competed for the title.

Represented	Contestant	Age
San José	Amanda Agüero Peralta	20
San José	Axa Valeria Pineda Madrigal	26
San José	Catalina Freer Castro	27
San José	Monica Zamora Chavarría	23
San José	Karla Paola Chacón Fuentes	27
San José	Yohanna Quesada Petgrave	24
Nicoya	Brenda Muñoz Hernández	25
Cahuita	Chonta Mullins Abegglen	22
Alajuela	Evelyn Sibaja Alfaro	26

== Notes ==
=== Disqualifications ===
- Paula Mendieta Siles: Paula was disqualified due to which she turned 29 in January, the organization only allows delegates from age 19–28.

== Crossovers ==
Delegates that competed or will be competing in other beauty pageants:

Miss Continents Unidos:

- Brenda Muñoz Hernández

Miss International Queen of Nature:

- Amanda Agüero Peralta

Miss Summer:

- Chonta Mullins Abegglen
- Evelyn Sibaja Alfaro

Miss Intercontinental:

- Brenda Muñoz Hernández

Chica Cointreau Costa Rica:

- Catalina Freer Castro

Miss Hispanomérica Internacional:

- Paola Chacón Fuentes

Miss Supranational:

- Monica Zamora Chavarría

Miss Latino Tourism:

- Axa Valeria Pineda Madrigal
- Monica Zamora Chavarría
- Paola Chacón Fuentes

Miss International:

- Paola Chacón Fuentes

Miss Universal Models:

- Axa Valeria Pineda Madrigal

Reina Internacional del Trópico:

- Amanda Agüero Peralta

Reinaldo Del Cafe:

- Brenda Muñoz Hernández

Queen of Costa Rica International:

- Paola Chacón Fuentes
