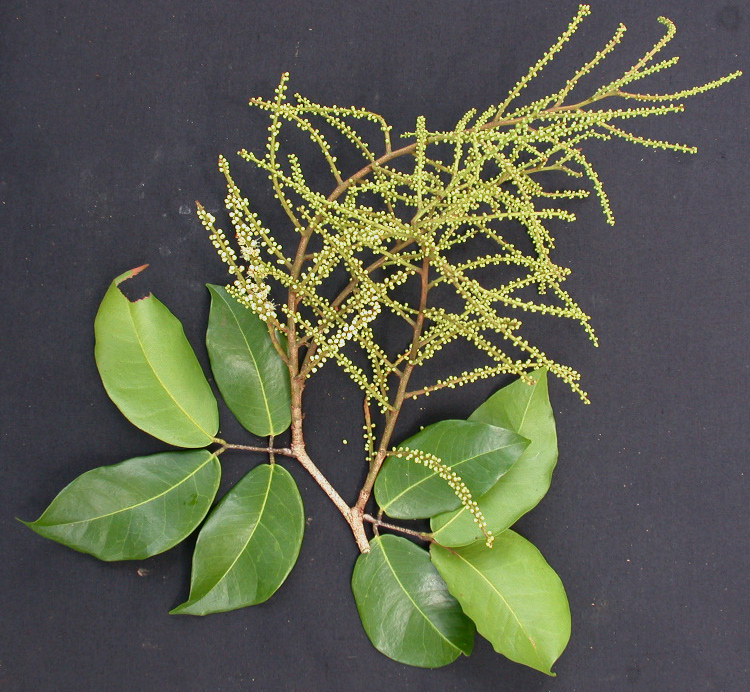
- Prioria copaifera leaves

Conservation status
- Least Concern (IUCN 3.1)

Scientific classification
- Kingdom: Plantae
- Clade: Embryophytes
- Clade: Tracheophytes
- Clade: Spermatophytes
- Clade: Angiosperms
- Clade: Eudicots
- Clade: Rosids
- Order: Fabales
- Family: Fabaceae
- Genus: Prioria
- Species: P. copaifera

Binomial name
- Prioria copaifera Griseb.

= Prioria copaifera =

Species of legume

Prioria copaifera is a tree in the family Fabaceae. It is native to tropical regions of Central and South America, where it occurs in tidal estuaries behind the mangrove fringe. It ranges from Nicaragua to Colombia and is also found in Jamaica.

The wood of Prioria copaifera can be used in carpentry and cabinet-making. Heartwood of the Prioria copaifera tree secretes a black resin when cut. Orchid bees collect this resin for nest construction.

In Costa Rica, Prioria copaifera is protected as a threatened species. The eco-lodge Playa Cativo is named after the Prioria copaifera.
