= Playa Cativo =

Coordinates: 8.67403°N 83.30774°W

Playa Cativo is an eco-lodge located in Golfo Dulce, Costa Rica.

Its name, Cativo, is the Spanish word for the tree Prioria copaifera. The surrounding waters are part of the Piedras Blancas National Park to protect the needle-fish spawning grounds. A former extension of Corcovado National Park, Piedras Blancas National Park has over 35,000 acres (14,000 ha) of rainforest that surrounds Playa Cativo and was created in 1993 to protect the lowland tropical rainforest in the Golfo Dulce.

Accessible only by boat, Playa Cativo was awarded the Ecologic Blue Flag for its cleanliness and sustainability practices. Because of the variety of micro climates, including wetlands, and the fact that is a gathered point for birds from North and South America, this area is considered a bird watcher's paradise.

The four species of monkeys of Costa Rica has been seen there and about three families of hauler monkeys stay year round near the shore. The beach was originally a family farm and in the early 1970s was sold. In 1980 was built the Rainbow Lodge in Playa Cativo, followed by the Buenavista Lodge. In July 2014, Playa Cativo Lodge (former Rainbow Lodge) opened after a full renovation. Playa Cativo's residents are committed to preserve the area as untouched as possible, and have established many sustainable practices and was recently awarded the Ecologic Blue Flag by the Costa Rica government. Among other actions, was created a recycle hub center as a free service for the people from the nearby beaches and communities. The electric power at Cativo is 100% clean and comes from an hydroelectric micro-generator and solar panels. The water source comes from a spring in the mountains behind Cativo beach and is clean and clear. Some of the all fruit trees still in the property, providing fresh organic fruits to visitors. Its tranquil waters are perfect for sea kayaking, stand up paddle boarding, swimming and snorkeling. As there are no roads to Playa Cativo, a 30 minutes scenic boat ride will take residents to Golfito or Puerto Jiménez, and often are seen dolphins and the seasonal humpback whales. Golfo Dulce, also known as Gulf of Dulce, is in the inner side of Osa Peninsula and across from Corcovado National Park.
