= Piedras Blancas District =

District in Osa canton, Puntarenas province, Costa Rica

Piedras Blancas
- District
- Piedras Blancas district
- Piedras Blancas district location in Costa Rica
- Coordinates: 8.8137489°N 83.2579471°W
- Country: Costa Rica
- Province: Puntarenas
- Canton: Osa
- Creation: 27 November 1995

Area
  - Total: 263.27 km^{2} (101.65 sq mi)
- Elevation: 30 m (98 ft)

Population (2011)
  - Total: 4,138
  - Density: 15.72/km^{2} (40.71/sq mi)
- Time zone: UTC−06:00
- Postal code: 60505

Piedras Blancas is a district of the Osa canton, in the Puntarenas province of Costa Rica.

== History ==
Piedras Blancas was created on 27 November 1995 by Decreto Ejecutivo 24819-G.

== Geography ==
Piedras Blancas has an area of 263.27 km^{2} and an elevation of 30 metres.

== Demographics ==
Historical population
Census	Pop.	±% p.a.
2000	3,546	—
2011	4,138	+1.41%
2022	5,724	+2.99%
Source: Instituto Nacional de Estadística y Censos; Centro Centroamericano de Población

According to the 2011 census, Piedras Blancas had a population of 4,138 inhabitants.

== Transportation ==
=== Road transportation ===
The district is covered by the following road routes:

- National Route 2
- National Route 245
