= Naranjito District =

District in Quepos canton, Puntarenas province, Costa Rica

Naranjito
- District
- Naranjito district
- Naranjito district location in Costa Rica
- Coordinates: 9.4817899°N 84.0803969°W
- Country: Costa Rica
- Province: Puntarenas
- Canton: Quepos
- Creation: 11 August 1971

Area
  - Total: 104.68 km^{2} (40.42 sq mi)
- Elevation: 95 m (312 ft)

Population (2011)
  - Total: 3,677
  - Density: 35.13/km^{2} (90.98/sq mi)
- Time zone: UTC−06:00
- Postal code: 60603

Naranjito is a district of the Quepos canton, in the Puntarenas province of Costa Rica.

== History ==
Naranjito was created on 11 August 1971 by Decreto 1904-G.

== Geography ==
Naranjito has an area of 104.68 km^{2} (40.42 sq mi) and an elevation of 95 metres.

== Demographics ==
Historical population
Census	Pop.	±% p.a.
1973	2,287	—
1984	1,760	−2.35%
2000	2,476	+2.16%
2011	3,677	+3.66%
2022	5,504	+3.74%
Source: Instituto Nacional de Estadística y Censos; Centro Centroamericano de Población

For the 2011 census, Naranjito had a population of 3,677 inhabitants.

== Transportation ==
=== Road transportation ===
The district is covered by the following road routes:

- National Route 616
