= Savegre =

District in Quepos canton, Puntarenas province, Costa Rica

- District
- Savegre district
- Savegre district location in Costa Rica
- Coordinates: 9.3517713°N 83.9428666°W
- Country: Costa Rica
- Province: Puntarenas
- Canton: Quepos

Area
  - Total: 216.07 km^{2} (83.43 sq mi)
- Elevation: 9 m (30 ft)

Population (2011)
  - Total: 3,326
  - Density: 15.39/km^{2} (39.87/sq mi)
- Time zone: UTC−06:00
- Postal code: 60602

Savegre is a district of the Quepos canton, in the Puntarenas province of Costa Rica.

== Geography ==
Savegre has an area of 216.07 km^{2} (83.43 sq mi) and an elevation of 9 metres.

== Villages ==
Administrative center of the district is the town of Matapalo.

Other villages are Dos Bocas, Guabas, Guápil, Hatillo Nuevo, Hatillo Viejo, Laguna, Nubes, Palma Quemada, Pasito, Paso, Paso Guanacaste, Platanillo, Playa Matapalo, Portalón, Punto de Mira, Salitral, Salsipuedes, San Andrés, Santo Domingo, Silencio, Tierras Morenas and Tres Piedras.

== Demographics ==
Historical population
Census	Pop.	±% p.a.
1950	1,808	—
1963	2,837	+3.53%
1973	3,419	+1.88%
1984	2,466	−2.93%
2000	2,787	+0.77%
2011	3,326	+1.62%
2022	5,381	+4.47%
Source: Instituto Nacional de Estadística y Censos; Centro Centroamericano de Población

For the 2011 census, Savegre had a population of 3,326 inhabitants.

== Transportation ==
=== Road transportation ===
The district is covered by the following road routes:

- National Route 34
- National Route 243
