= Sierpe =

District in Osa canton, Puntarenas province, Costa Rica

- District
- Sierpe district
- Sierpe district location in Costa Rica
- Coordinates: 8.8086583°N 83.4864252°W
- Country: Costa Rica
- Province: Puntarenas
- Canton: Osa

Area
  - Total: 631.15 km^{2} (243.69 sq mi)
- Elevation: 8 m (26 ft)

Population (2011)
  - Total: 4,205
  - Density: 6.662/km^{2} (17.26/sq mi)
- Time zone: UTC−06:00
- Postal code: 60503

Sierpe is a district of the Osa canton, in the Puntarenas province of Costa Rica.

== Geography ==
Sierpe has an area of 631.15 km^{2} and an elevation of 8 metres.

== Demographics ==
Historical population
Census	Pop.	±% p.a.
1950	1,506	—
1963	4,117	+8.04%
1973	3,486	−1.65%
1984	4,081	+1.44%
2000	4,124	+0.07%
2011	4,205	+0.18%
2022	3,075	−2.81%
Source: Instituto Nacional de Estadística y Censos; Centro Centroamericano de Población

According to the 2011 census, Sierpe had a population of 4,205.

== Transportation ==
=== Road transportation ===
The district is covered by the following road routes:

- National Route 223
- National Route 245
