= Bali Rodríguez =

Bali Rodríguez (full name, Bárbara Laura Rodríguez Bonilla) was born on August 8, 1984, in San Jose Costa Rica. She is the daughter of former Miss Costa Rica Bárbara Bonilla and Carlos Rodríguez, the owner of La Guacima racetrack.

Bali Rodriguez began modelling professionally when she was 17 years old. She lived in Sydney, Australia for 2 years working on building her career. She has lived or worked in Miami Beach, Milan, Greece, Hamburg, Düsseldorf, Munich, Barcelona, Dubai, Los Angeles, Tokyo and Singapore. Her last known city of residence was New York.

Bali Rodriguez has modelled for Pierre Cardin Lingerie, Raoul Fashion, Avon Mascara, Olay Total Effects, Sally Hansen Cosmetics and other fashion brands making her a role model to the Costa Rican public in the international fashion scene.

Bali Rodriguez is the founder of the first modelling agency in Costa Rica recognized internationally, Unique Model Management Costa Rica.

== Filmography ==
- AE Apocalypse Earth (2013) as Lea

== Sources ==
- http://www.perfilcr.com/contenido/articles/1873/1/Bali-Rodriguez-sin-miedo-a-la-fama/Page1.html%5B%5D
- https://www.unitedmodels.eu/models/Girls/bali_rodriguez/index.html%5B%5D
- https://www.majormodel.net
- http://www.fashionmodel.it/0x_book_frame0.asp?lang=ING&ID=1830&sex=WOMAN&argomento=&iniz=b&milano=false&pag=1
- https://web.archive.org/web/20110710182203/http://www.elitemodel.com/details.aspx?navbtn=1&city=MI&modelid=437967&pic=017.jpg&subid=4671&mainsubid=4671&io=&indx=2
- http://www.priscillas.com.au/detailcard.asp?careerid=1&sexid=2&modelid=30136&subNameid=1802&curpage=&letter=
