= National Route 616 (Costa Rica) =

National Road Route in Costa Rica

National Tertiary Route 616
- Ruta nacional terciaria 616

Route information
- Maintained by Ministry of Public Works and Transport
- Length: 9.715 km (6.037 mi)

Location
- Country: Costa Rica
- Provinces: Puntarenas

Highway system
- National Road Network of Costa Rica
← Route 615	→ Route 617

National Tertiary Route 616, or just Route 616 (Spanish: Ruta Nacional Terciaria 616, or Ruta 616) is a National Road Route of Costa Rica, located in the Puntarenas province.

== Description ==
In Puntarenas province the route covers Quepos canton (Quepos, Naranjito districts).
