= Miss Costa Rica 2009 =

- Date: March 27, 2009
- Venue: Museo de los Niños, San José de Costa Rica, Costa Rica
- Broadcaster: Teletica
- Entrants: 9
- Winner: Jessica Umaña Solís; Distrito Capital

The Miss Costa Rica 2009 was held on March 27, 2009. Nine contestants entered, each representing a province and national capital. The pageant was held in the capital city. The location was The Auditorio del Museo de los Niños de Costa Rica. Jessica Umaña, representing the National Capital, was crowned the winner. Umaña, who stands 1.75 m tall, was one of the favorites for the title. This was her second try at the crown (she had competed in Miss Costa Rica 2008, but withdrew before the finals took place). She decided to try again, winning the title over 8 other contestants. The winner will enter Miss Universe 2009, Reina Hispanoamericana 2009 and Miss Continente Americano 2009. The first runner up will enter Miss World 2009 and Miss Tourism Queen International 2009. The second runner up will enter Miss International 2009 and Miss Intercontinental 2009. The third runner up will enter Miss Earth 2009 and Reinado Internacional del Café 2009.

== Results ==
=== Placements ===
Placement	Contestant
Miss Costa Rica 2009	Distrito Capital – Jessica Umaña Solís
1st Runner-Up	Heredia – Nancy Montero
2nd Runner-Up	San José – Natalia Álvarez
Top 5	Alajuela – Karol Quirós; Puntarenas – Lucía Cascante

=== Special awards ===
- Best Smile - Karol Quirós (Alajuela)
- Best in Swimsuit - Jessica Umaña (Distrito Capital)
- Best Provincial Costume - Karol Castro (Limón)
- Miss Congeniality - Jessica Umaña (Distrito Capital)
- Miss Photogenic - Nancy Montero (Heredia)
- Best Face - Nancy Montero (Heredia)
- Best Hair - Nancy Montero (Heredia)
- Best Model - Karol Quirós (Alajuela)
- Miss Communication - Lucía Cascante (Puntarenas)

== Candidates ==
Province	Contestant	Age	Height	Hometown
Alajuela	Karol Quirós Mora	19	1.80 m (5 ft 10 3/4 in)	San Ramón
Cartago	Stephanie Zúñiga Mateo	23	1.70 m (5 ft 7 in)	San Rafael
Distrito Capital	Jessica Umaña Solís	21	1.78 m (5 ft 10 in)	San José
Guanacaste	Mariana Angula Mora	20	1.70 m (5 ft 7 in)	Cañas
Heredia	Nancy Montero Contreras	24	1.68 m (5 ft 6 1/4 in)	San Francisco de Heredia
Limón	Karol Castro Martínez	21	1.76 m (5 ft 9 1/4 in)	San Pedro de Poás
Puntarenas	Lucía Cascante Acuña	20	1.84 m (6 ft 1/2 in)	Tibás
San José	Natalia Álvarez Sandoval	20	1.72 m (5 ft 7 3/4 in)	Desamparados
Valle del Bosque	Astrid Anke Stroh Samuels	20	1.68 m (5 ft 6 1/4 in)	Nicoya
