= Tárcoles =

District in Garabito canton, Puntarenas province, Costa Rica

- District
- Tárcoles district
- Tárcoles district location in Costa Rica
- Coordinates: 9.7759009°N 84.6255324°W
- Country: Costa Rica
- Province: Puntarenas
- Canton: Garabito
- Creation: 30 November 1988

Area
  - Total: 172.87 km^{2} (66.75 sq mi)
- Elevation: 36 m (118 ft)

Population (2011)
  - Total: 5,544
  - Density: 32.07/km^{2} (83.06/sq mi)
- Time zone: UTC−06:00
- Postal code: 61102

Tárcoles is a district of the Garabito canton, in the Puntarenas province of Costa Rica.

== History ==
Tárcoles was created on 30 November 1988 by Acuerdo 431. Segregated from Jacó.

== Geography ==
Tárcoles has an area of 172.87 km^{2} (66.75 sq mi) and an elevation of 36 metres.

== Demographics ==
Historical population
Census	Pop.	±% p.a.
2000	4,007	—
2011	5,544	+3.00%
2022	9,842	+5.36%
Source: Instituto Nacional de Estadística y Censos; Centro Centroamericano de Población

For the 2011 census, Tárcoles had a population of 5,544 inhabitants.

== Transportation ==
=== Road transportation ===
The district is covered by the following road routes:

- National Route 34
- National Route 320
