= Nazareth Cascante =

Costa Rican model (born 1990)

Maria Nazareth Cascante Madrigal
- Born: Maria Nazareth Cascante Madrigal; October 20, 1990 (age 35); Alajuela, Costa Rica
- Height: 1.73 m (5 ft 8 in)
- Beauty pageant titleholder
- Title: Miss Costa Rica 2012 Miss Teen International 2009
- Hair color: Black
- Eye color: Hazel
- Major competitions: Miss Teen International 2009 (Winner); Miss Costa Rica 2012 (Winner); Miss Universe 2012 (Unplaced)

Maria Nazareth Cascante Madrigal (born October 20, 1990) is a Costa Rican model and beauty pageant titleholder who was crowned Miss Costa Rica 2012 and was represented her country in the Miss Universe 2012. Nazareth was also crowned as Miss Teen International in 2009.

== Early life ==
Nazareth is a student of Pharmaceutical Science from El Tambor of Alajuela.

== Miss Costa Rica 2012 ==
Nazareth Cascante has been crowned Miss Costa Rica 2012 on Saturday night 14 April 2012 at the Teletica studios in San Jose. Nazareth Cascante is an official representative of Costa Rica in Miss Universe 2012 which is the 61st edition of Miss Universe beauty contest. As a part of winner prize, Nazareth Cascante have won a new wardrobe and jewelry set, a new car and about $7,000 in cash.

Awards and achievements
Preceded by Johanna Solano	Miss Costa Rica; 2012	Succeeded by Fabiana Granados
