= AE: Apocalypse Earth =

- Film poster
- Directed by: Thunder Levin; Agung Bagus
- Written by: Thunder Levin; Agung Bagus; Paul Bales
- Produced by: David Michael Latt; David Rimawi; Paul Bales
- Starring: Adrian Paul; Richard Grieco; Bali Rodriguez
- Cinematography: Richard Vialet
- Edited by: Bobby K. Richardson
- Music by: Chris Ridenhour
- Distributed by: The Asylum
- Release date: March 28, 2013
- Running time: 90 minutes
- Country: United States
- Language: English

AE: Apocalypse Earth is a 2013 American science fiction film produced by The Asylum, directed by Thunder Levin and Agung Bagus, starring Adrian Paul and Richard Grieco. It is a mockbuster of After Earth and Oblivion.

== Plot ==
A group of refugees from Earth crash land on a planet inhabited by ruthless aliens and fight for their survival.

The film opens on a scene of battle and retreat as spaceship 'arks' are loading civilians for transplant to other worlds. Lt. Frank Baum is one of the military officers in charge of overseeing the loading of the transports. Owing to a bombing run of the city by Earth's alien attackers and riots on the ground by scared people he and a few of his people get shoved into the ship along with the last of people boarding and are removed from Earth along with the regular evacuees. He reluctantly submits to cryo storage when he finds he cannot get back to his post on Earth. When the ship finally descends planet-side it breaks up due to atmospheric pressures and crash lands. Many people die in the crash while others end up having to run for their lives after they are attacked on the ground by near-invisible humanoids they christen chameleons. Frank is able to assemble a small group of survivors including a small set of humans who also crash landed two years ago from the Alpha Centauri-bound ark. They find and are aided by a camouflage-skinned native female named Lea. While being chased by the Chameleons they learn of and pursue the goal of finding a left over space ship facing difficulties and fatalities during their journey. Most of the survivors choose to follow Frank in his pursuit of leaving the planet and returning to Earth but one wants to remain and plots to kill the Captain of the ship that brought them there. While they eventually find the ship and are able to scavenge parts from the ark to make it work, their numbers continue to decrease through attrition by native fauna and additional Chameleon attacks. When they finally reach space and are able to get their bearings, they find in a 'Planet of the Apes' twist that they are actually on Earth - 325,000 years after they left.

== Cast ==
- Adrian Paul as Lieutenant Frank Baum
- Richard Grieco as Captain Sam Crowe
- Bali Rodriguez as Lea
- Gray Hawks as Tim
- Steve Bencich as Jason
- Erik Werther as Arlo
- Cesar Alvarado as Humanoid Advisor
- Hazel Zumbado as Cyro Technician
- Laura Pacheco as Vasquez

== Production ==
AE: Apocalypse Earth was shot in Costa Rica.

== Release ==
The film was released direct-to-DVD on March 28, 2013. In the tradition of The Asylum's catalog, AE: Apocalypse Earth is a mockbuster of the M. Night Shyamalan film After Earth, which it preceded by a week.

== Reception ==
Scott Foy of Dread Central rated the film 3/5 stars and called it "a genuinely decent, old-fashioned science fiction adventure that could have really been something out-of-this-world if not for its meager budget keeping it earthbound." Nav Qateel of Influx Magazine rated it D and wrote, "There is nothing remotely original in their latest masterpiece but it is a bit better than their normal efforts." Note that "Lt Frank Baum" is named after L Frank Baum, creator of the Oz stories.
