= Johanna Solano =

Miss Costa Rica 2011 (born 1990)

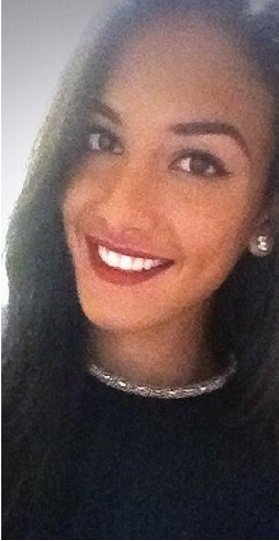
- Born: Johanna Solano Lopez; October 9, 1990 (age 36); San José, Costa Rica
- Height: 1.75 m (5 ft 9 in)
- Beauty pageant titleholder
- Title: Miss Latin America 2009; Miss Costa Rica 2011
- Hair color: Black
- Eye color: Brown
- Major competitions: Miss Latin America 2009; (Winner); Miss Costa Rica 2011; (Winner); Miss Universe 2011; (Top 10)

Johanna Solano López (born October 9, 1990) is a Costa Rican TV Host, model, actress, triathlete and ex beauty pageant titleholder who represented her country at Miss Universe 2011 and placed Top 10.

== Early life ==
Solano was born in San José to Sergio Solano Serrano and Ileana López Araya. She is the second of four children. She is currently studying psychology at Hispanameric University, located in Heredia and is fluent in Spanish, Portuguese and English.

== Pageantry ==
=== Miss Latin America 2009 ===
The Queens organization of Costa Rica decided to send a new competition after participating in the International Coffee Pageant and was crowned in the 23rd edition of the competition on May 23 Miss Latin America 2009 in Punta Cana Dominican Republic.

=== Miss Costa Rica 2011 ===
On March 25, 2011, Solano was crowned Miss Costa Rica 2011 in an event held at the National Museum Auditorium Children in San Jose. This win gave Johanna the right to represent Costa Rica at Miss Universe 2011.

=== Miss Universe 2011 ===
On September 12, 2011 Johanna represented Costa Rica at Miss Universe 2011, held at the Credicard Hall in São Paulo, Brazil where she finished in the Top 10. This was Costa Rica's first placement since 2004.

== After Pageantry ==
After her participation at Miss Universe 2011, she began training and eventually competing in triathlon, she won the category 25–29 at the Ironman 70.3 Monterrey in Mexico held on May 15, 2017, a third place in the 25-30 category at the Ironman Cozumel held in Mexico on November 26, 2017 and other number of finishes in various Ironman around the world. Johanna Solano también participó en la Serie Triatlón Costa Rica 2024, celebrada en las playas del Coco, Guanacaste, y demostró una vez más su destreza y determinación en la competencia.

Awards and achievements
Preceded by Jazmin Zuñiga	Representatión of Heredia; 2011	Succeeded by No Participatión
Preceded by Marva Wright	Miss Costa Rica; 2011	Succeeded by Nazareth Cascante
