= Bahía Drake District =

District in Osa canton, Puntarenas province, Costa Rica

Bahía Drake
- District
- Interactive map of Bahía Drake
- Bahía Drake district location in Costa Rica
- Coordinates: 8.6449811°N 83.6862375°W
- Country: Costa Rica
- Province: Puntarenas
- Canton: Osa
- Creation: 3 August 2012

Area
  - Total: 393.39 km^{2} (151.89 sq mi)
- Elevation: 60 m (200 ft)
- Time zone: UTC−06:00
- Postal code: 60506

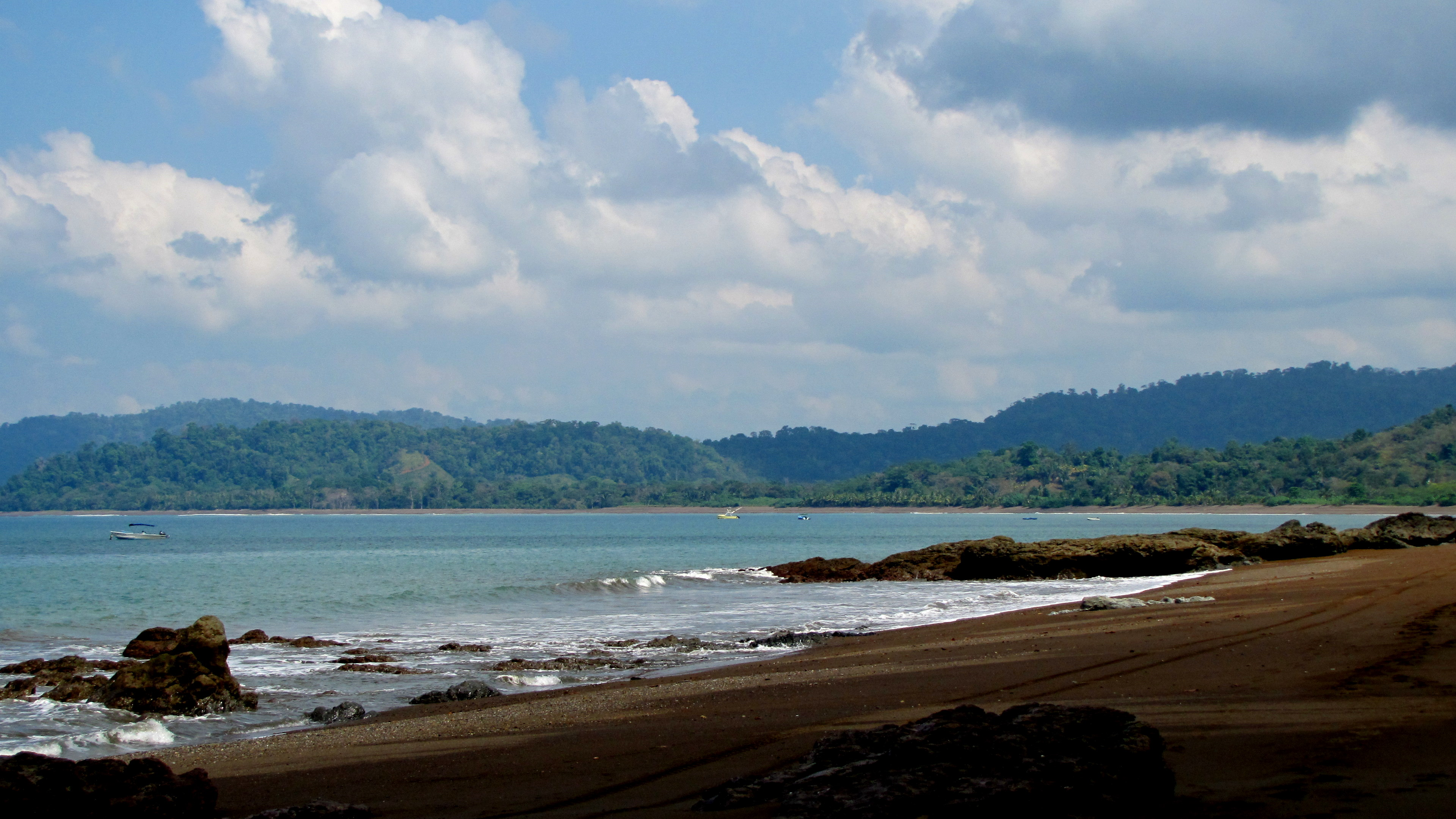

Bahía Drake is a district of the Osa canton, in the Puntarenas province of Costa Rica.

== History ==
Bahía Drake was created on 3 August 2012 by Acuerdo Ejecutivo N° 36-2012-MGP.

== Geography ==
Bahía Drake has an area of 393.39 km^{2} (151.89 sq mi) and an elevation of 60 metres.

== Demographics ==
Historical population
Census	Pop.	±% p.a.
2022	2,190	—
Source: Instituto Nacional de Estadística y Censos; Centro Centroamericano de Población

For the 2011 census, Bahía Drake had not been created, therefore census data will be available until 2021.
