= Jacó, Costa Rica =

District in Garabito canton, Puntarenas province, Costa Rica

Jacó
- District
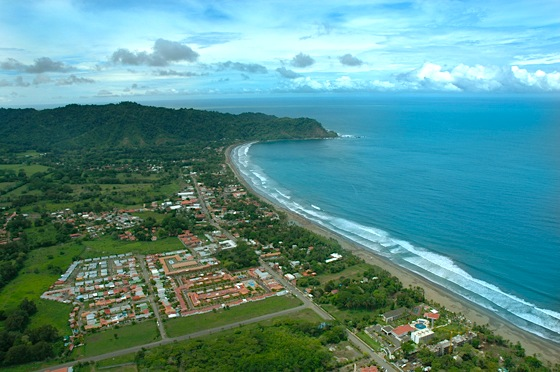
- Jacó Beach
- Interactive map of Jacó
- Jacó district location in Costa Rica
- Coordinates: 9.6200496°N 84.6044399°W
- Country: Costa Rica
- Province: Puntarenas
- Canton: Garabito
- Creation: 16 September 1965

Area
  - Total: 141.11 km^{2} (54.48 sq mi)
- Elevation: 7 m (23 ft)

Population (2011)
  - Total: 11,685
  - Density: 82.808/km^{2} (214.47/sq mi)
- Time zone: UTC−06:00
- Postal code: 61101

Jacó (Spanish pronunciation: [xa'ko]) is a district of the Garabito canton, in the Puntarenas province of Costa Rica. Jacó has a black sand beach that is 4 km (2.5 mi) long and is popular among surfers.

== History ==
Jacó was created as a district on 16 September 1965, after being segregated from Puntarenas.

== Geography ==
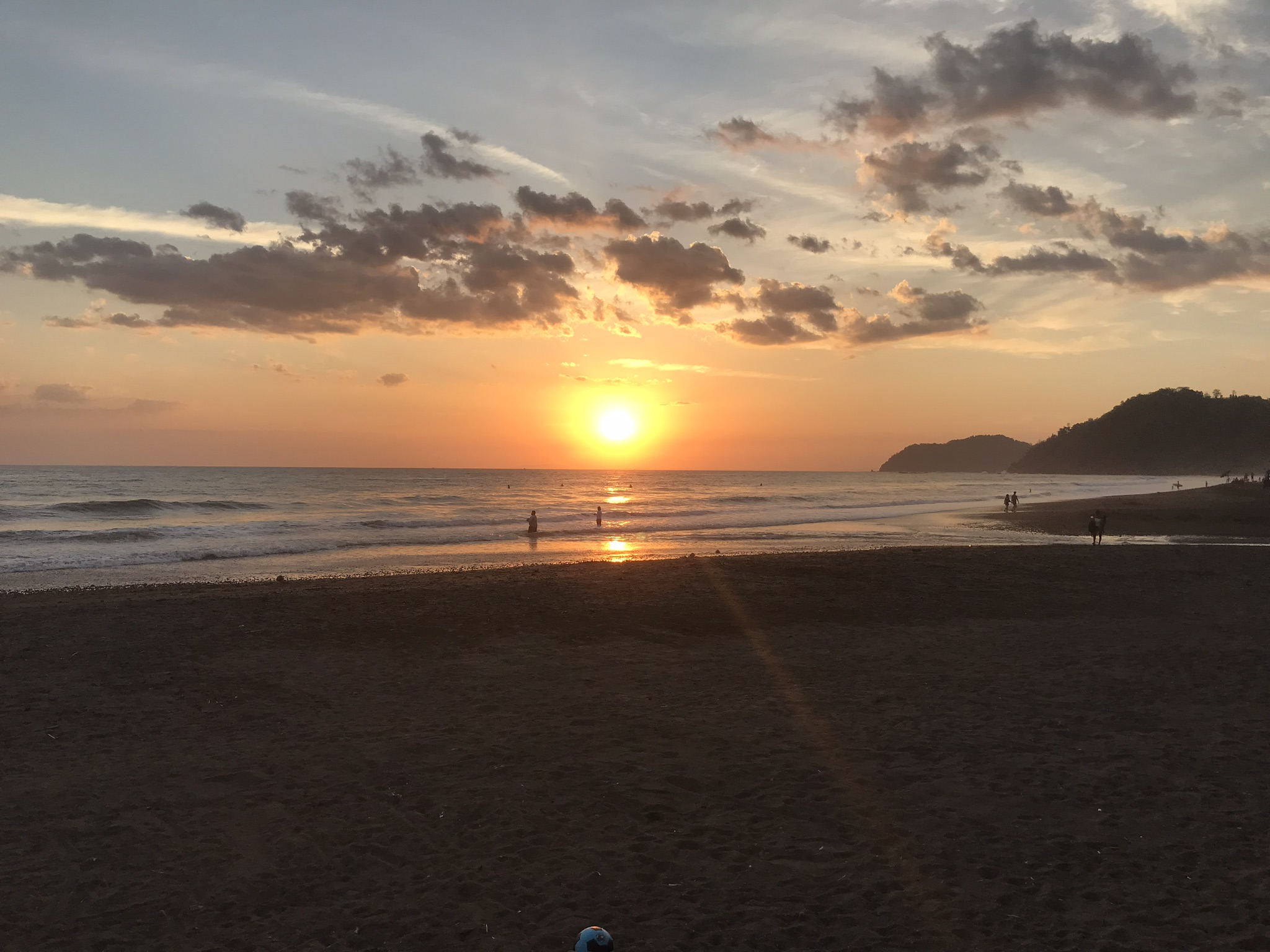
Jacó Beach in 2018.

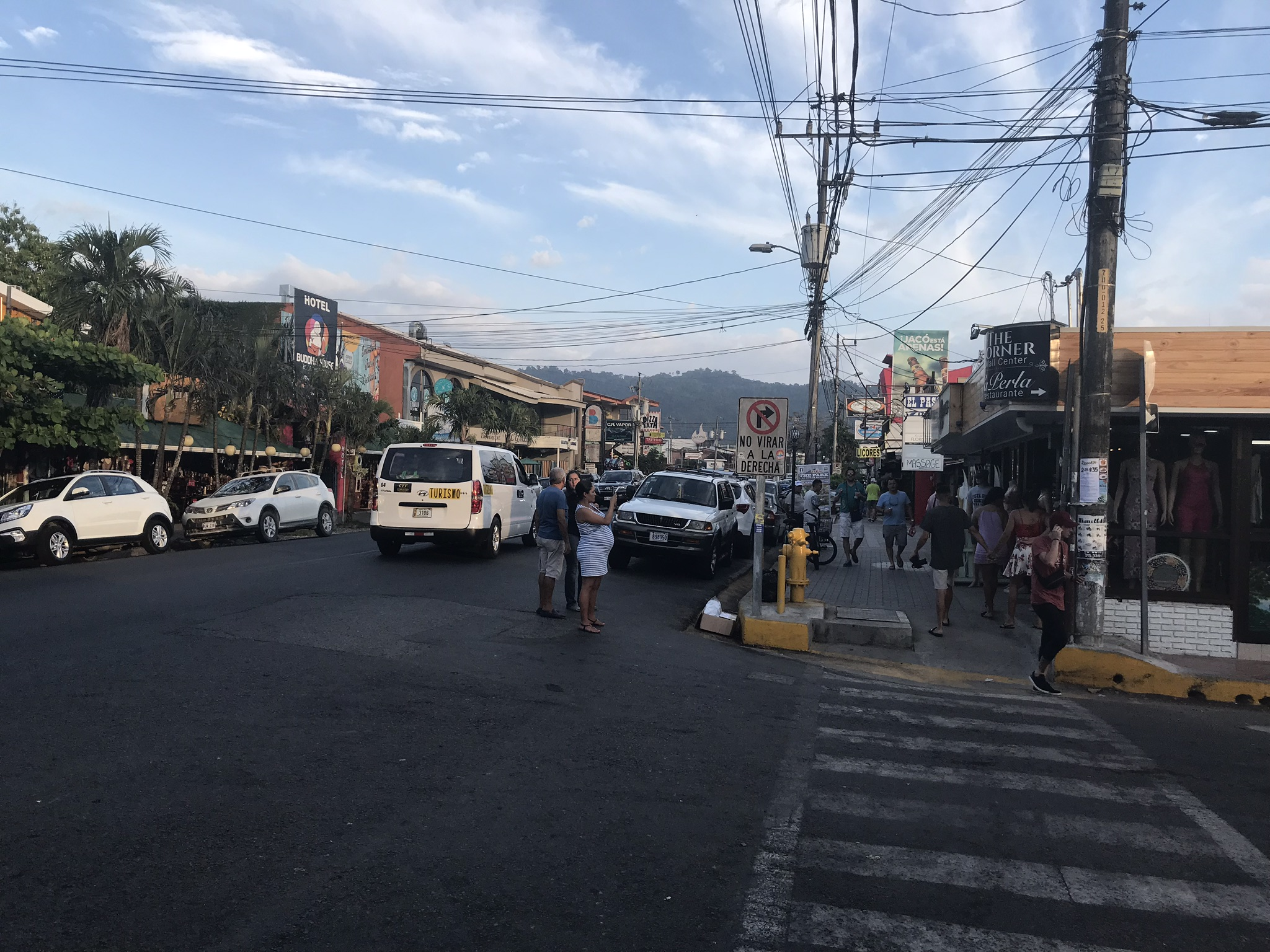
Jacó town

Jacó has an area of 141.11 km^{2} (54.48 sq mi) and an elevation of 7 metres.

Jacó lies between several mountains, and is neighbored by the beaches of Herradura Bay to the North, and Playa Hermosa to the South (not to be confused with another beach by the same name, but located in Guanacaste). About 35 kilometers north of Jacó, lies the Carara National Park, recognized for its exuberant wildlife and dense rain forest. Carara is home to one of the largest remaining populations of wild scarlet macaws in the country. The Manuel Antonio National Park is located 75 kilometres south of Jacó.

Jacó lies about 100 kilometers (a little less than two hours via Route 34) from the capital San José and an hour and a half from Costa Rica's primary international airport, Juan Santamaría International, accessed via Route 27 and Route 34.

== Climate ==
As Jacó lies on the seashore, climate is normally humid, with relative humidity around 80%, reaching 90% in June. Temperature is 24–32 °C (75–90 °F) during the day and 24–26 °C (75–79 °F) at night. During the dry season, away from the water, the temperature may consistently reach 35 °C (95 °F) or above.

Jacó lies in a tropical climate zone mainly defined by distinct dry and wet seasons. Generally speaking, August through early December are wet, and late December through early April are dry; the remaining months have irregular rainy spells.

== Demographics ==
Historical population
Census	Pop.	±% p.a.
1973	2,959	—
1984	3,144	+0.55%
2000	6,371	+4.51%
2011	11,685	+5.67%
2022	16,830	+3.37%
Source: Instituto Nacional de Estadística y Censos; Centro Centroamericano de Población

For the 2011 census, Jacó had a population of 11,685 inhabitants.

== Transportation ==
=== Road transportation ===
The district is covered by the following road routes:

- National Route 34

== Economy ==
=== Tourism ===
The beach in Jacó hosts several surfing schools and various shops that sell and rent equipment for surfing. Jacó is also near beaches for more professional surfers, such as Hermosa Beach, which is just five minutes away, with pipes and beach break for experienced surfers only.

Jacó is not only known for its beaches and nightlife, but is near several national parks. Manuel Antonio National Park is only about an hour to the south. There are several excursions available in Jacó, such as ATV and horseback riding tours, snorkeling cruise to Tortuga Island, hiking, and ziplining.
