= Garabito (canton) =

Canton in Puntarenas province, Costa Rica

- Canton
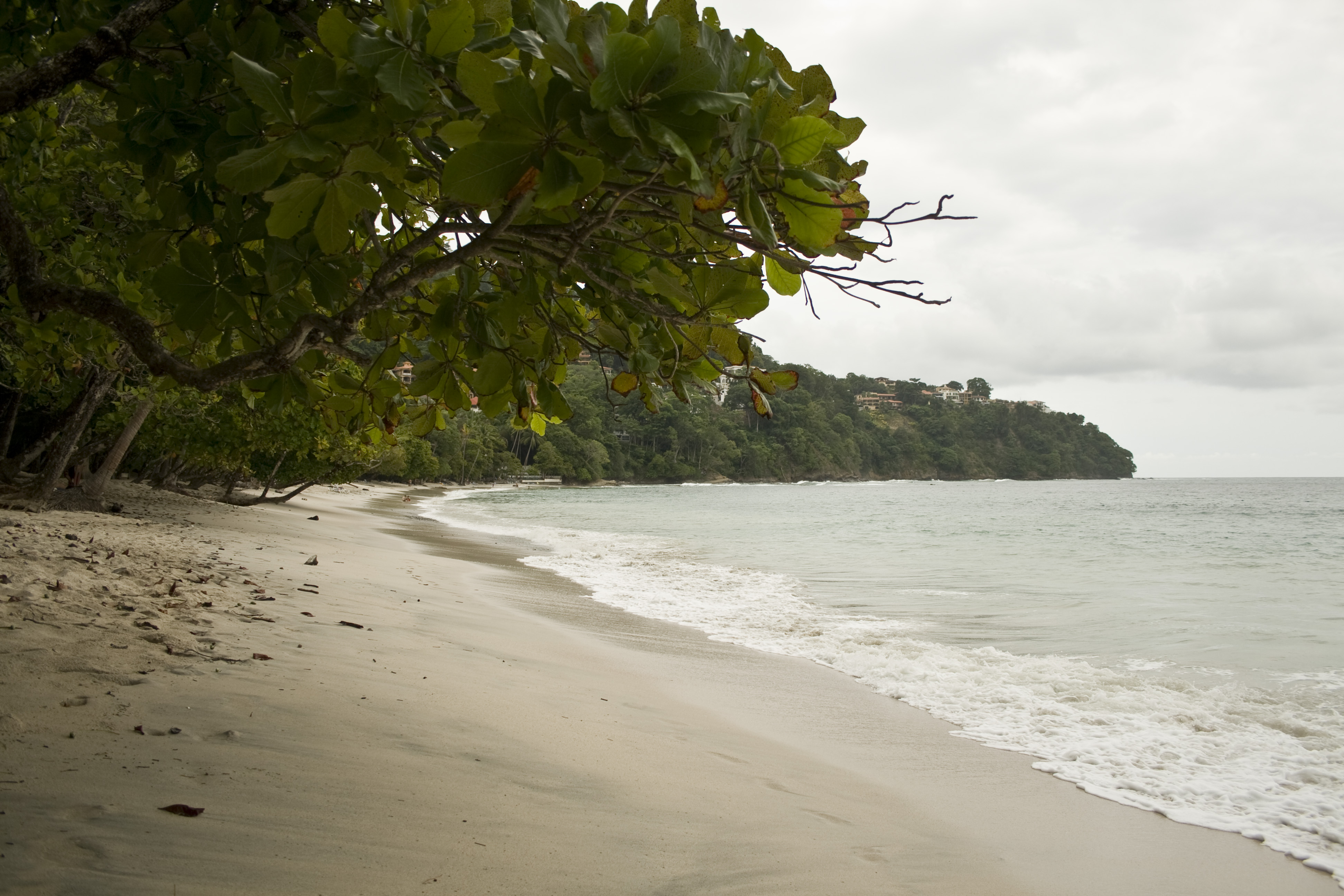
- Punta Leona beach, in Garabito canton.

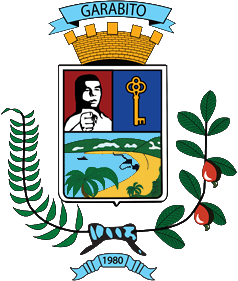
- Flag Seal
- Interactive map of Garabito
- Garabito canton location in Costa Rica
- Coordinates: 9.7072525°N 84.6147906°W
- Country: Costa Rica
- Province: Puntarenas
- Creation: 25 September 1980
- Head city: Jacó
- Districts: Districts: Jacó; Tárcoles; Lagunillas

Government
  - Type: Municipality
  - Body: Municipalidad de Garabito

Area
  - Total: 316.31 km^{2} (122.13 sq mi)
- Elevation: 22 m (72 ft)

Population (2011)
  - Total: 17,229
  - Density: 54.469/km^{2} (141.07/sq mi)
- Time zone: UTC−06:00
- Canton code: 611
- Website: www.munigarabito.go.cr

Garabito is a canton in the Puntarenas province of Costa Rica. The head city is in Jacó district.

== History ==
Garabito was created on 25 September, 1980 by decree 6512.

== Geography ==
Garabito has an area of 316.31 km^{2} and a mean elevation of 22 metres.

The canton lies along the north-central Pacific coast between Punta Loros near the town of Tivives and the mouth of the Tusubres River. The eastern boundary runs through the Fila Negra, a coastal mountain range.

== Districts ==
The canton of Garabito is subdivided into the following districts:

1. Jacó
2. Tárcoles
3. Lagunillas

== Demographics ==
Historical population
Census	Pop.	±% p.a.
1984	3,144	—
2000	10,378	+7.75%
2011	17,229	+4.72%
2022	26,672	+4.05%
Source: Instituto Nacional de Estadística y Censos; Centro Centroamericano de Población

For the 2011 census, Garabito had a population of 17,229 inhabitants. Garabito has a population density of 54.5 people/km^{2} (141 people/mi^{2}).

== Transportation ==
=== Road transportation ===
The canton is covered by the following road routes:

- National Route 34
- National Route 320
