= Quepos =

District in Quepos canton, Puntarenas province, Costa Rica

- District
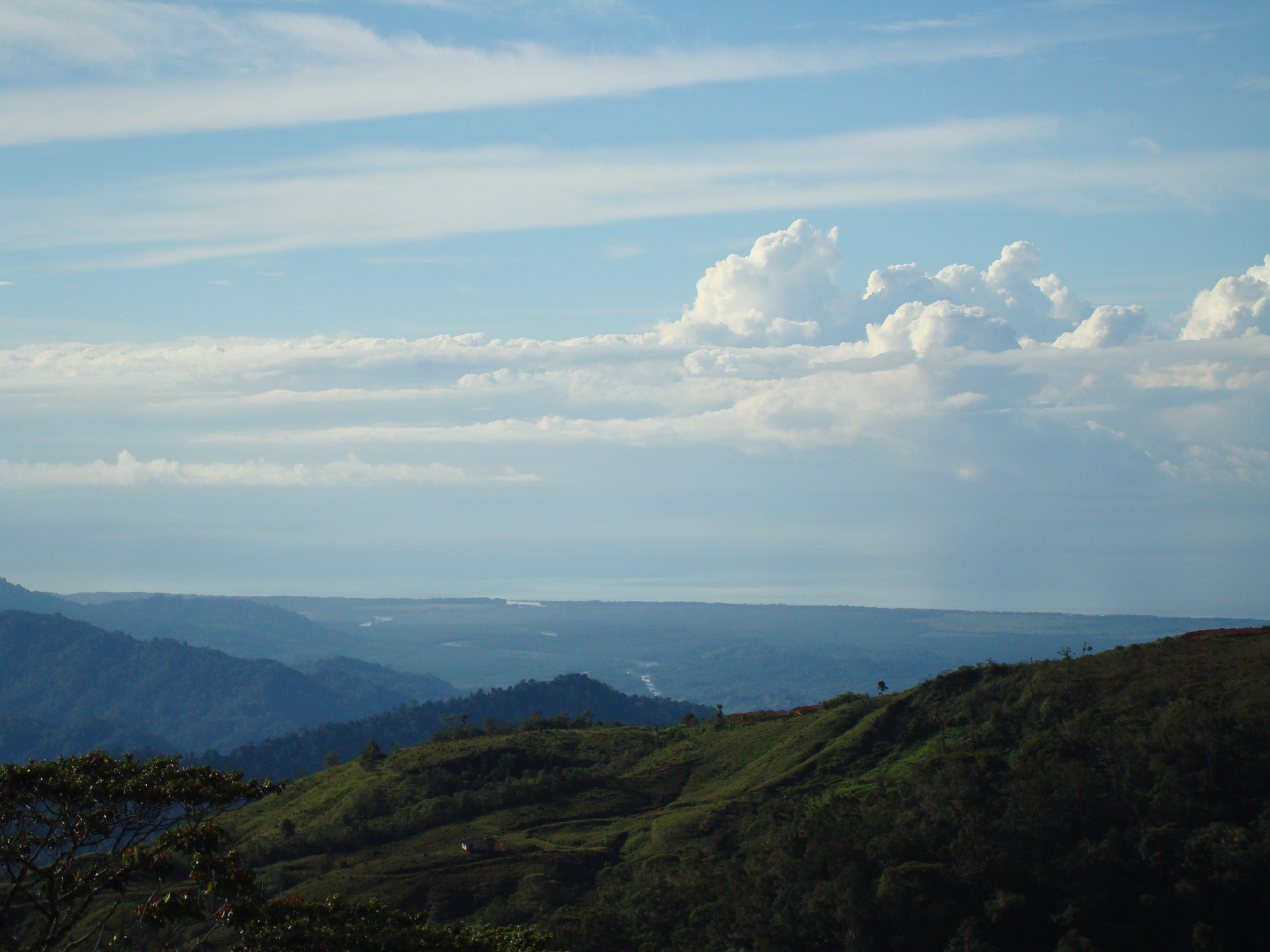
- Quepos coastline as seen from Concepción, in the Tarrazú highlands, Costa Rica
- Quepos district
- Quepos district location in Costa Rica
- Coordinates: 9.4570718°N 84.1387451°W
- Country: Costa Rica
- Province: Puntarenas
- Canton: Quepos

Area
  - Total: 235.81 km^{2} (91.05 sq mi)
- Elevation: 5 m (16 ft)

Population (2011)
  - Total: 19,858
  - Density: 84.212/km^{2} (218.11/sq mi)
- Time zone: UTC−06:00
- Postal code: 60601

Quepos (Spanish pronunciation: [ˈkepos]) is a district of the canton of Quepos, in the province of Puntarenas, Costa Rica.

== Toponymy ==
The town is named for the native Quepo Indians who inhabited the place in the colonial era.

== History ==
The area was home to the native Quepoa people of this specific Costa Rican region. In 1563, Spanish Catholic conquistadores, led by Juan Vázquez de Coronado, settled the area and founded the settlement of San Bernardino de Quepo. The local native Quepo people were then subsequently subjugated by Juan Vázquez and his conquistadores.

In 1746, the Quepo people that remained were transferred to a reservation which already contained another native ethnic group. Quepos offers fishing for numerous varieties of fish, especially Pacific Sailfish. Peak fishing season is from November to April for billfish.

== Geography ==
Quepos has an area of 235.81 km^{2} (91.05 sq mi) and an elevation of 5 metres.

The town is about 60 km. south (in a straight line) from Costa Rica's capital, San José, but is 157 km from that city by road if going through the localities of Atenas, Orotina and Tárcoles.

== Villages ==
Administrative center of the district is the town of Quepos.

Other villages are Anita, Bartolo, Boca Naranjo, Cañas, Cañitas, Cerritos, Cerros, Damas, Delicias, Espadilla, Estero Damas, Estero Garita, Llamarón, Llorona, Managua, Manuel Antonio, Marítima, Mona, Papaturro, Paquita, Pastora, Quebrada Azul, Rey, Ríos and Roncador.

== Demographics ==
Historical population
| Census | Pop. | ±% p.a. |
|---|---|---|
| 1950 | 10,456 | — |
| 1963 | 10,228 | −0.17% |
| 1973 | 8,767 | −1.53% |
| 1984 | 9,093 | +0.33% |
| 2000 | 14,925 | +3.15% |
| 2011 | 19,858 | +2.63% |
| 2022 | 21,531 | +0.74% |
Source: Instituto Nacional de Estadística y Censos; Centro Centroamericano de Población

For the 2011 census, Quepos had a population of 19,858 inhabitants.

== Transportation ==
=== Road transportation ===
The district is covered by the following road routes:

- National Route 34
- National Route 235
- National Route 616
- National Route 618

== Economy ==
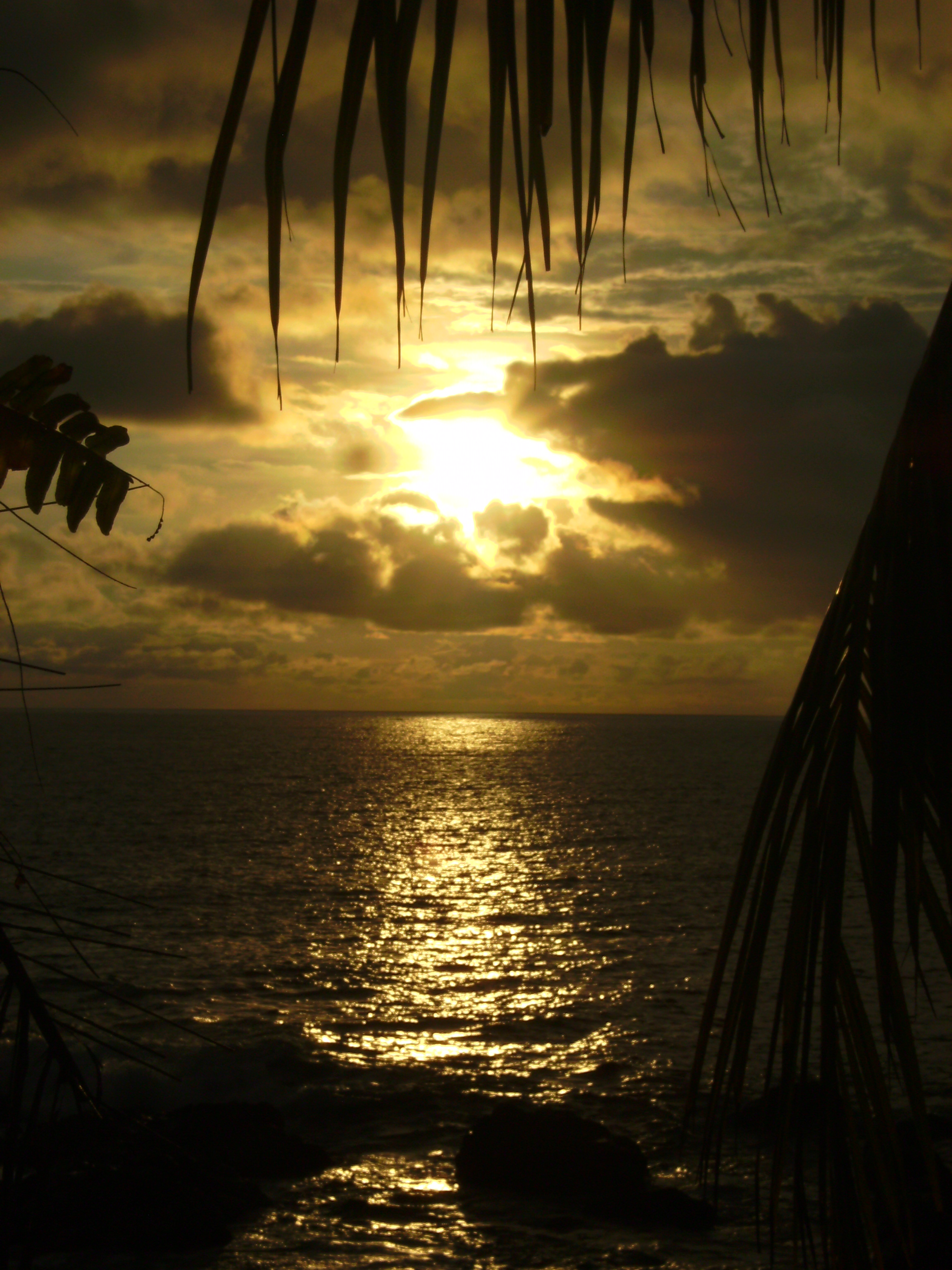
Sunset at Quepos.

Quepos is the gateway to Manuel Antonio National Park. The city is very tourism-oriented, having many bars and restaurants and a vibrant nightlife. Quepos is well known thanks to being the gateway to a popular National Park and beaches in Costa Rica. Several years ago the country's park service imposed limits on the number of visitors to the park (600 per day, and it is closed on Mondays).

== Climate ==
Quepos has a tropical monsoon climate (Am) with moderate to little rainfall from January to March and heavy to very heavy rainfall in the remaining months.

Climate data for Quepos (1984–2003)
| Month | Jan | Feb | Mar | Apr | May | Jun | Jul | Aug | Sep | Oct | Nov | Dec | Year |
|---|---|---|---|---|---|---|---|---|---|---|---|---|---|
| Mean daily maximum °C (°F) | 31.3 (88.3) | 32.0 (89.6) | 32.4 (90.3) | 32.2 (90.0) | 31.4 (88.5) | 30.8 (87.4) | 30.5 (86.9) | 30.4 (86.7) | 30.3 (86.5) | 30.0 (86.0) | 29.8 (85.6) | 30.6 (87.1) | 31.0 (87.7) |
| Mean daily minimum °C (°F) | 22.0 (71.6) | 22.0 (71.6) | 22.6 (72.7) | 23.5 (74.3) | 23.3 (73.9) | 23.1 (73.6) | 22.8 (73.0) | 22.7 (72.9) | 22.6 (72.7) | 22.6 (72.7) | 22.6 (72.7) | 22.3 (72.1) | 22.7 (72.8) |
| Average precipitation mm (inches) | 45.9 (1.81) | 25.8 (1.02) | 40.0 (1.57) | 156.9 (6.18) | 389.0 (15.31) | 413.3 (16.27) | 444.9 (17.52) | 468.7 (18.45) | 544.3 (21.43) | 533.5 (21.00) | 349.0 (13.74) | 159.7 (6.29) | 3,571 (140.59) |
| Average precipitation days | 7.2 | 4.2 | 5.4 | 12.4 | 22.9 | 23.6 | 25.7 | 26.4 | 26.5 | 26.7 | 23.2 | 15.2 | 219.4 |
Source: World Meteorological Organization
