= Osa Wildlife Sanctuary =

Animal rescue center in Costa Rica

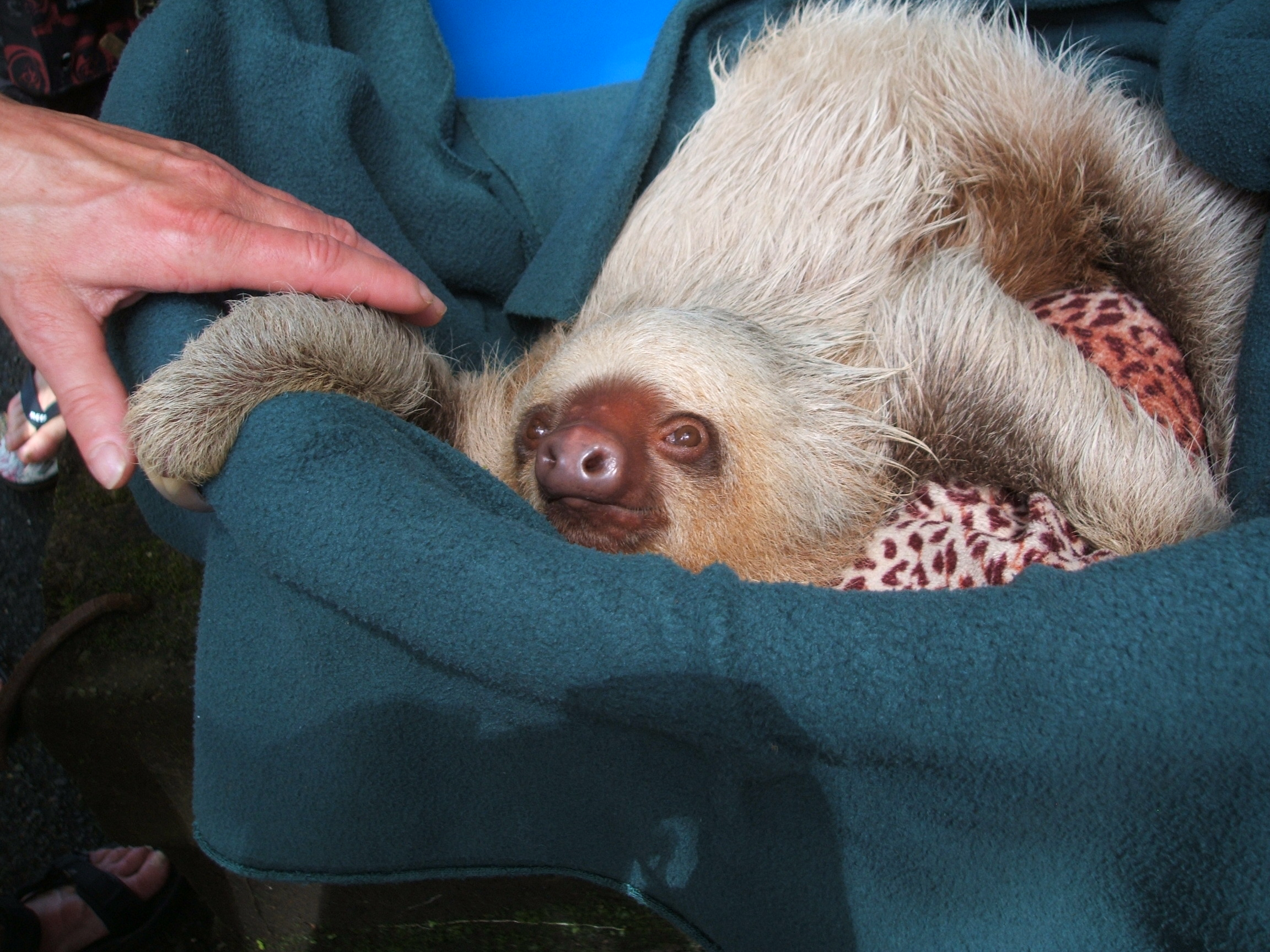
- Baby two-toed sloth at the Caña Blanca Sanctuary
- Interactive map of Osa Wildlife Sanctuary
- 8.6738011°N 83.3170995°W
- Date opened: October 2003
- Location: Osa Peninsula; Costa Rica
- No. of animals: 70+
- Website: osawildlife.org

The Osa Wildlife Sanctuary (Spanish: Fundación Santuario Silvestre de Osa), or Caña Blanca Wildlife Sanctuary, was an animal rescue center located on the Osa Peninsula in southwestern Costa Rica. The sanctuary was accessible only by boat and was completely surrounded by Piedras Blancas National Park. The center was dedicated to the rehabilitation of mistreated, injured, orphaned, and/or confiscated animals. The animals that were received by the sanctuary included a variety of monkeys, anteaters, exotic birds, sloths, and wildcats. Once the animals were fully rehabilitated, they were reintroduced into their natural habitats in protected areas within Costa Rica, including Corcovado National Park. The Osa Wildlife Sanctuary was a nonprofit organization that received funds from volunteers, donations, and tours.

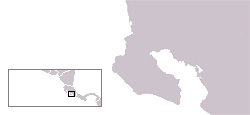
The Osa Wildlife Sanctuary on the Osa Peninsula in Costa Rica

== History ==
The Osa Wildlife Sanctuary was originally a eco-lodge owned by a woman named Carol Patrick, its purpose being to house guests. While she was running the eco-lodge she was asked by locals to take care of injured and abandoned animals. After accepting a few at first, the animals under her care continued to grow, until in 2003 she opened the wildlife sanctuary. The property has continued to develop towards animal care and release since then, the once eco-lodge has now been developed to include animal enclosures and housing and dining for the staff.

According to the sanctuary's website, on December 19, 2022, the government agencies responsible for wildlife confiscated all the caged animals and trapped some free-roaming ones. The website also states that the sanctuary is permanently closed to the public.

== See also ==
- List of zoos by country: Costa Rica zoos
