= Uvita (Costa Rica) =

Beach town in southern Costa1 Rica

Coordinates: 9.1738°N 83.7399°W

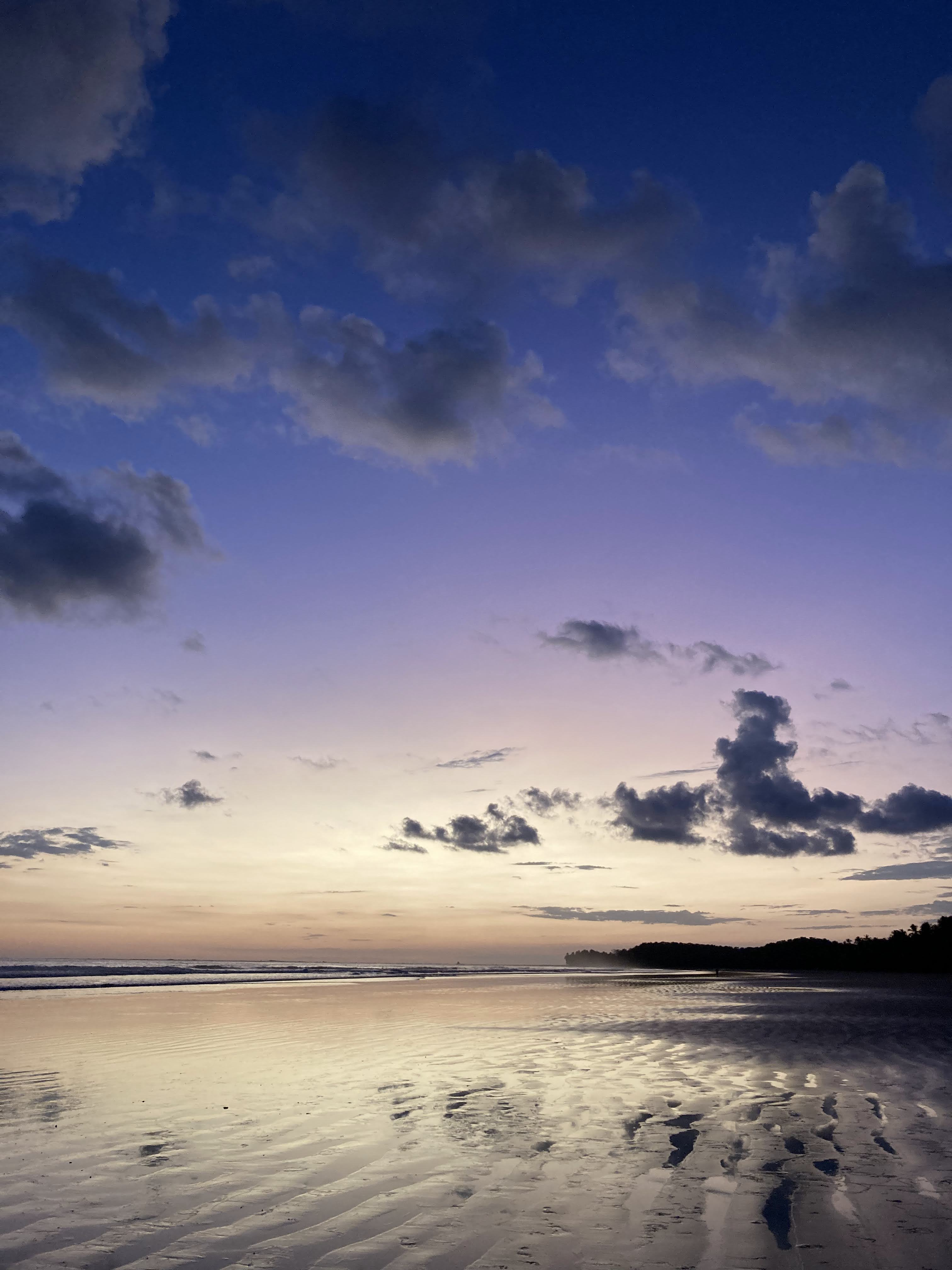
Sunset over Uvita beach

Uvita de Osa, is a small town in southern Costa Rica, on a section of coastline known as the Bahía Ballena.

== Tourism ==
Uvita has become the tourist and adventure tour hub of the Costa Ballena region. The town offers several tours ranging from whale watching to horseback riding. The town is also known for its many restaurants and accommodations catering to tourists..

== Wildlife ==
The region around Uvita is home to a large variety of animals. Uvita regularly is regularly visited by humpback whales which come from Northern California and Alaska during one time of the year and groups that come from the south and Antarctica during another time of the year.

=== Birds ===
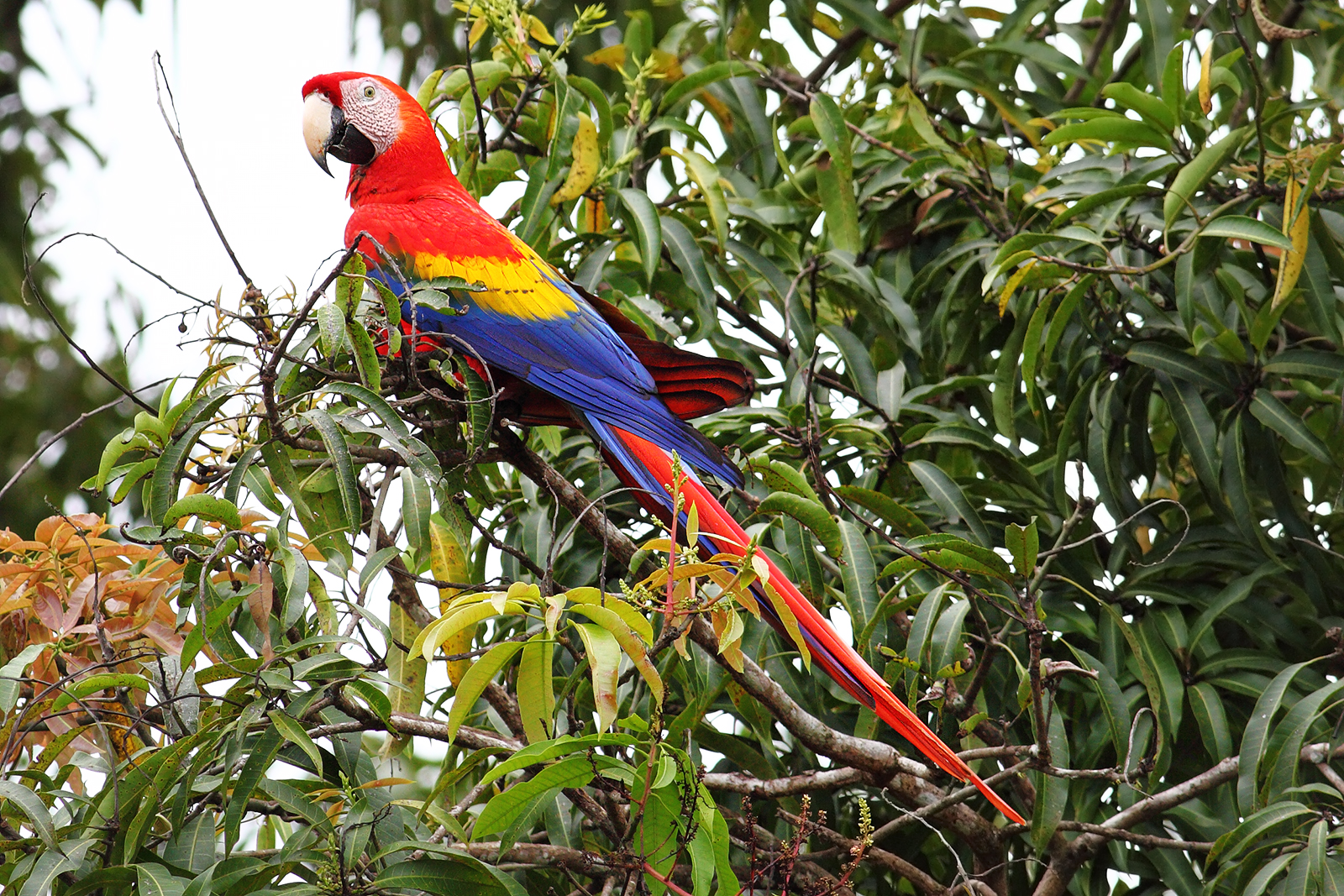

At Hacienda Baru National Wildlife Preserve, fifteen minutes north of Uvita, more than 350 different species of birds have been identified.

- Scarlet Macaw
- Green and Little Blue Herons
- American White Pelican
- Many varieties of Hummingbirds
- Many other species of birds, such as fiery-billed aracaris, collared aracaris, broad-winged hawks, great kiskadees, hook-billed kites, slaty-tailed trogons, flycatchers, chachalacas, crested oropendolas, collared forest falcons, chestnut-mandibled toucans, red lored parrots, saltators, orioles, kingfishers, crimson-fronted parakeets and orange-chinned parakeets.

=== Insects ===
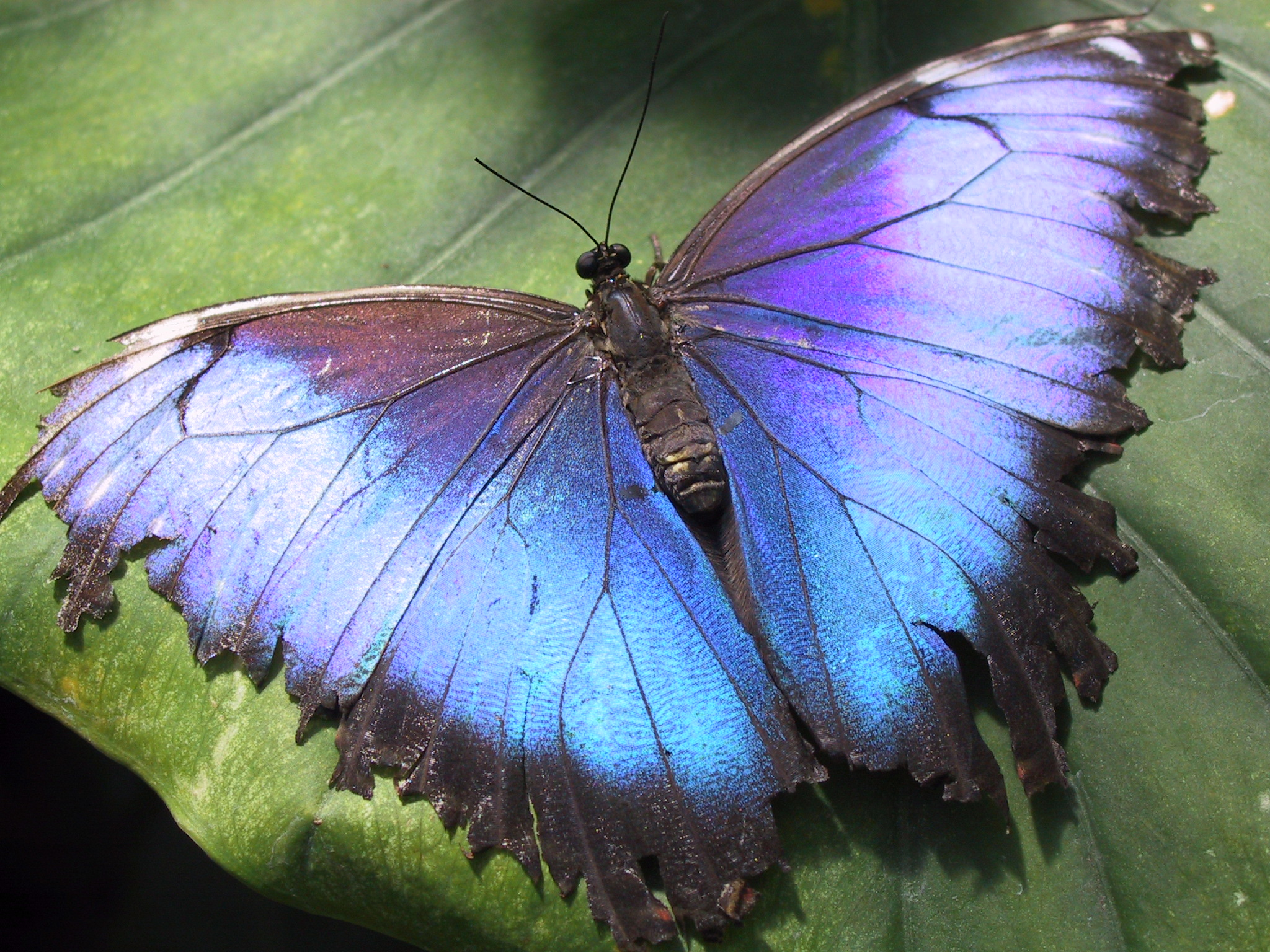

- Hercules Beetle
- Scarabs
- Leaf-Cutter and Army Ants
- Blue Morpho and Glasswing Butterfly
- Thaos Swallowtail

=== Mammals ===
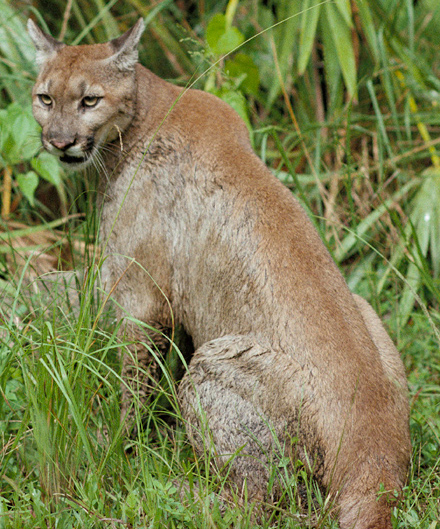

- Howler Monkey and Capuchin Monkey
- Baird's Tapir
- Pumas
- Jaguarundis
- Margays
- Ocelots
- Vampire Bats
- Bottlenose Dolphins
- Pantropical Spotted Dolphins
- Humpback Whales
- False Killer Whales
- Pilot Whales

=== Reptiles ===
- Green Sea Turtles
- Olive Ridley Turtles
- Yellow-bellied Sea Snake
- Green or Black Iguana
- Striped Basilisk
- Boa Constrictors
- eyelash viper
- bushmaster
- fer de lance
- Spectacled Caiman
- American Crocodile

=== Fish ===
- White-tipped reef shark
- Nurse Shark
- Cortez Angelfish
- Butterfly fish
- Parrot Fish
- Puffer Fish

=== Amphibians ===
- Giant Toad
- Red-Eyed Tree Frog
- Dart Frog
- Glass Frog
