= Osa (canton) =

Canton in Puntarenas province, Costa Rica

- Canton
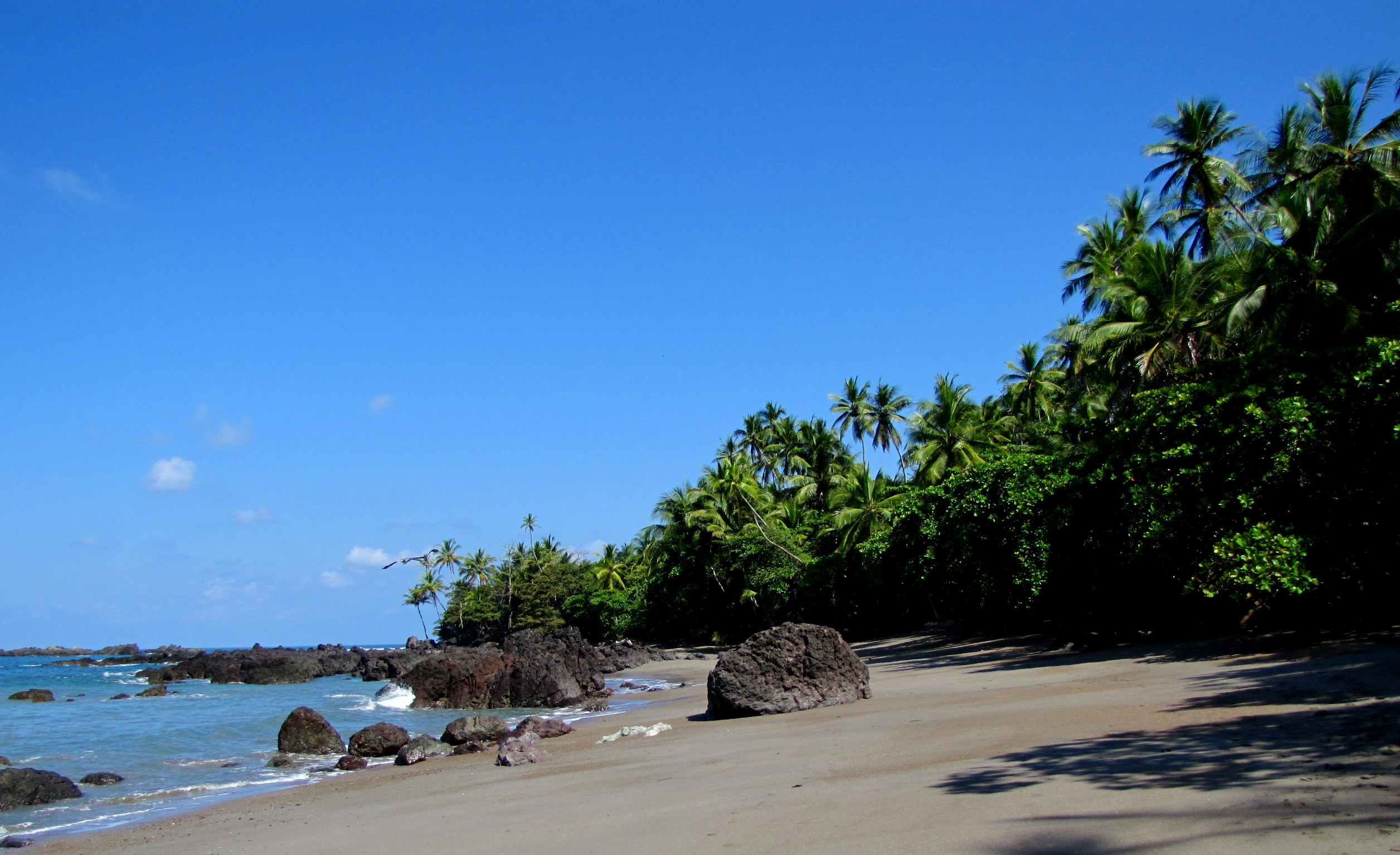
- Corcovado National Park

- Flag
- Osa canton
- Osa canton location in Costa Rica
- Coordinates: 8.8913368°N 83.5286361°W
- Country: Costa Rica
- Province: Puntarenas
- Creation: 29 July 1940
- Head city: Puerto Cortés
- Districts: Districts: Puerto Cortés; Palmar; Sierpe; Bahía Ballena; Piedras Blancas; Bahía Drake

Government
  - Type: Municipality
  - Body: Municipalidad de Osa

Area
  - Total: 1,930.24 km^{2} (745.27 sq mi)
- Elevation: 24 m (79 ft)

Population (2011)
  - Total: 29,433
  - Density: 15.248/km^{2} (39.493/sq mi)
- Time zone: UTC−06:00
- Canton code: 605
- Website: www.gobiernolocalosa.go.cr

Osa is a canton in the Puntarenas province of Costa Rica. The head city is in Puerto Cortés district.

== History ==
Osa was created on 29 July, 1940 by decree 185. In pre-Columbian times, Osa was populated by Boruca which left legacies such as fields and stone walkways.

== Geography ==
Osa has an area of 1,930.24 km^{2} and a mean elevation of 24 metres.

The canton begins at the Barú River near Dominical on the central Pacific coast. It continues as a narrow strip of land southward to include the area around Palmar and Sierpe, finally widening to take in the entire neck and upper portion of the Osa Peninsula, where significant gold mining operations are located. As its name suggests, humpback whales and dolphins migrate into the waters to calve, mate, and to rest. Whale watching is available along the coasts. Isla del Caño is part of Osa canton.

== Districts ==
The canton of Osa is subdivided into the following districts:

1. Puerto Cortés
2. Palmar
3. Sierpe
4. Bahía Ballena
5. Piedras Blancas
6. Bahía Drake

== Demographics ==
Historical population
Census	Pop.	±% p.a.
1927	4,367	—
1950	11,518	+4.31%
1963	17,574	+3.30%
1973	24,613	+3.43%
1984	26,294	+0.60%
2000	25,861	−0.10%
2011	29,433	+1.18%
2022	36,088	+1.87%
Source: Instituto Nacional de Estadística y Censos; Centro Centroamericano de Población

For the 2011 census, Osa had a population of 29,433 inhabitants.

== Transportation ==
=== Road transportation ===
The canton is covered by the following road routes:

- National Route 2
- National Route 34
- National Route 168
- National Route 223
- National Route 245

== Conservation and tourism ==
In the canton there are conservation areas that are part of the Osa Conservation Area, such as Corcovado National Park, Ballena Marine National Park and Piedras Blancas National Park. The stone spheres of Costa Rica are found in this canton.
