= Quepos (canton) =

Canton in Puntarenas province, Costa Rica

- Canton
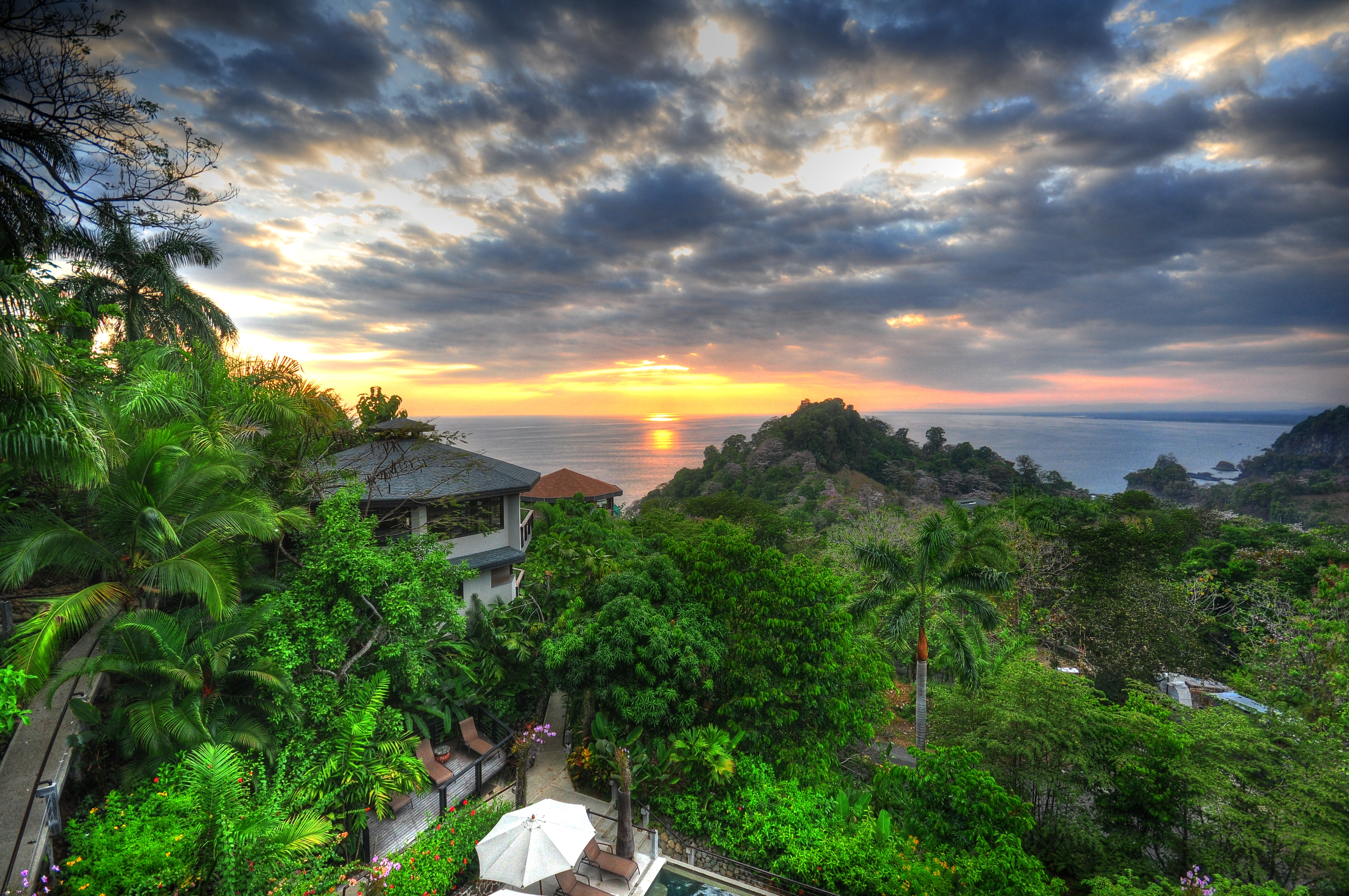
- Sunset in Quepos

- Flag
- Quepos canton
- Quepos canton location in Costa Rica
- Coordinates: 9.412973°N 84.0467398°W
- Country: Costa Rica
- Province: Puntarenas
- Creation: 30 October 1948
- Head city: Quepos
- Districts: Districts: Quepos; Savegre; Naranjito

Government
  - Type: Municipality
  - Body: Municipalidad de Quepos

Area
  - Total: 543.77 km^{2} (209.95 sq mi)
- Elevation: 36 m (118 ft)

Population (2011)
  - Total: 26,861
  - Density: 49.398/km^{2} (127.94/sq mi)
- Time zone: UTC−06:00
- Canton code: 606
- Website: muniquepos.go.cr

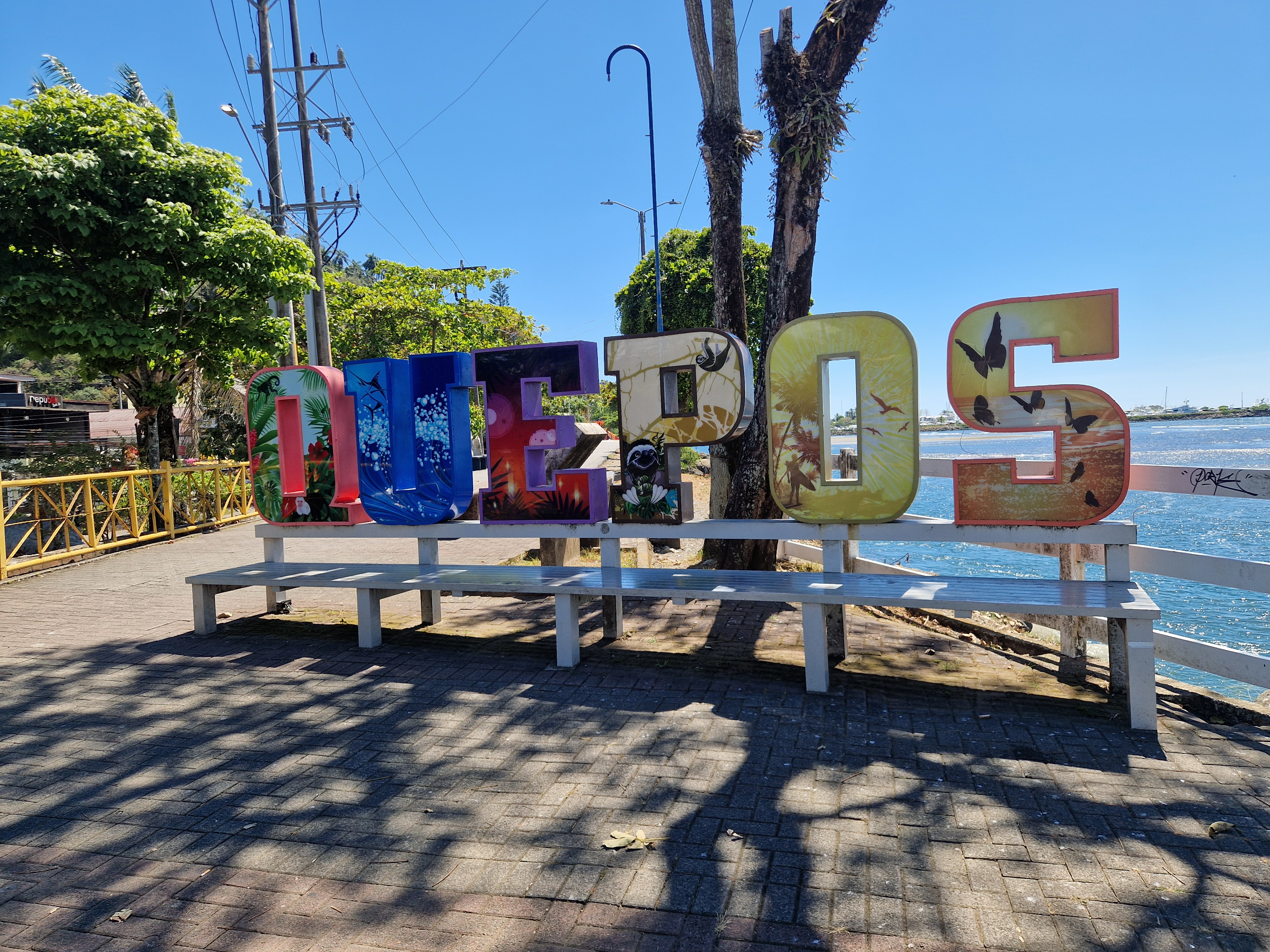
Quepos City

Quepos is a canton in the Puntarenas province of Costa Rica. The head city is in Quepos district.

== Toponymy ==
It was named Aguirre until February 2015, when its name was changed following a vote in the Legislative Assembly. The name Quepos refers to the Quepoa people who inhabited this area in pre-Columbian and colonial times.

== History ==
Quepos was created on 30 October 1948 by decree 235.

== Geography ==
Quepos has an area of 543.77 km^{2} (209.95 sq mi) and a mean elevation of 36 metres.

The canton lies along the central Pacific coast between the mouths of the Damas and Barú rivers. The northeastern border runs through high, remote coastal mountain ranges. The county is most famous for being the home of the Manuel Antonio National Park, the most visited national park in Costa Rica.

== Districts ==
The canton of Quepos is subdivided into the following districts:

1. Quepos
2. Savegre
3. Naranjito

== Demographics ==
Historical population
| Census | Pop. | ±% p.a. |
|---|---|---|
| 1950 | 15,291 | — |
| 1963 | 19,942 | +2.06% |
| 1973 | 14,473 | −3.15% |
| 1984 | 13,319 | −0.75% |
| 2000 | 20,188 | +2.63% |
| 2011 | 26,861 | +2.63% |
| 2022 | 32,416 | +1.72% |
Source: Instituto Nacional de Estadística y Censos; Centro Centroamericano de Población

For the 2011 census, Quepos had a population of 26,861 inhabitants.

== Transportation ==
=== Road transportation ===
The canton is covered by the following road routes:

- National Route 34
- National Route 235
- National Route 243
- National Route 616
- National Route 618
