= Johanna Fernández =

Costa Rican model and beauty pageant titleholder

Johanna Fernández (born 1982) is a Costa Rican model and beauty pageant titleholder who was crowned Miss Costa Rica 2005 and represented her country at the Miss Universe 2005 pageant. At the time she was a student at San Judas University.

As of 2023, she works in human resources.

Awards and achievements
Preceded by Nancy Soto	Miss Costa Rica; 2005	Succeeded by Fabriella Quesada
