= National Route 168 (Costa Rica) =

National Road Route in Costa Rica

National Secondary Route 168
- Ruta nacional secundaria 168

Route information
- Maintained by Ministry of Public Works and Transport
- Length: 4.005 km (2.489 mi)

Location
- Country: Costa Rica
- Provinces: Puntarenas

Highway system
- National Road Network of Costa Rica
← Route 167	→ Route 169

National Secondary Route 168, or just Route 168 (Spanish: Ruta Nacional Secundaria 168, or Ruta 168) is a National Road Route of Costa Rica located in the Puntarenas province.

== Description ==
In Puntarenas province the route covers Osa canton (Puerto Cortés district).
