= Osa Peninsula =

Peninsula located in southwestern Costa Rica

Coordinates: 8.55°N 83.5°W

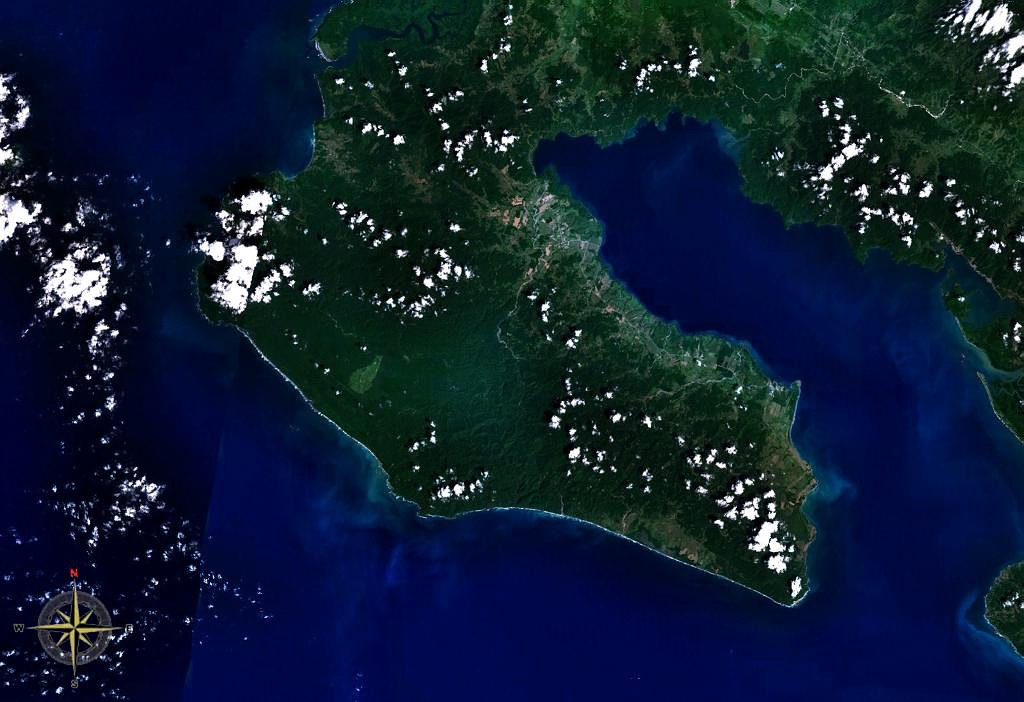
Osa Peninsula seen from space

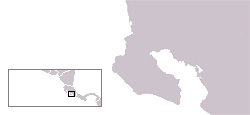
Location of the Osa Peninsula

The Osa Peninsula (Spanish: Península de Osa) is a peninsula located in southwestern Costa Rica, in the Puntarenas Province, with the Pacific Ocean to the west and the Golfo Dulce to the east. The peninsula was formed geologically by a faulting system that extends north into California.

The peninsula is home to at least half of all species living in Costa Rica. The main town on the peninsula is Puerto Jimenez, which has its own airport and provides access to Corcovado National Park as well as the coastal villages of Cabo Matapalo and Carate. A large part of the peninsula is a wildlife/forest preserve that is protected: the Osa Conservation Area.

== See also ==
- Coronado Bay, northwest of Osa Peninsula
- Drake Bay, located on the north side of the peninsula
- Golfito
- Osa Wildlife Sanctuary
- Playa Cativo
