= Bahía Ballena =

District in Osa canton, Puntarenas province, Costa Rica

- District
- Interactive map of Bahía Ballena
- Bahía Ballena district location in Costa Rica
- Coordinates: 9.1792793°N 83.7406835°W
- Country: Costa Rica
- Province: Puntarenas
- Canton: Osa
- Creation: 23 July 1991

Area
  - Total: 160.39 km^{2} (61.93 sq mi)
- Elevation: 12 m (39 ft)

Population (2011)
  - Total: 3,306
  - Density: 20.61/km^{2} (53.39/sq mi)
- Time zone: UTC−06:00
- Postal code: 60504

Bahía Ballena is a district of the Osa canton, in the Puntarenas province of Costa Rica.

== History ==
Bahía Ballena was created on 23 July 1991 by Decreto Ejecutivo 20588-G.

== Geography ==
Bahía Ballena has an area of 160.39 km^{2} and an elevation of 12 metres.

== Demographics ==
Historical population
Census	Pop.	±% p.a.
2000	1,990	—
2011	3,306	+4.72%
2022	4,384	+2.60%
Source: Instituto Nacional de Estadística y Censos; Centro Centroamericano de Población

For the 2011 census, Bahía Ballena had a population of 3,306 inhabitants.

== Transportation ==
=== Road transportation ===
The district is covered by the following road routes:

- National Route 34
