= National Route 235 (Costa Rica) =

National Road Route in Costa Rica

National Secondary Route 235
- Ruta nacional secundaria 235

Route information
- Maintained by Ministry of Public Works and Transport
- Length: 7.095 km (4.409 mi)

Location
- Country: Costa Rica
- Provinces: Puntarenas

Highway system
- National Road Network of Costa Rica
← Route 234	→ Route 236

National Secondary Route 235, or just Route 235 (Spanish: Ruta Nacional Secundaria 235, or Ruta 235) is a National Road Route of Costa Rica, located in the Puntarenas province.

== Description ==
In Puntarenas province the route covers Quepos canton (Quepos district).
