= Miss Universe Costa Rica =

National beauty pageant competition in Costa Rica

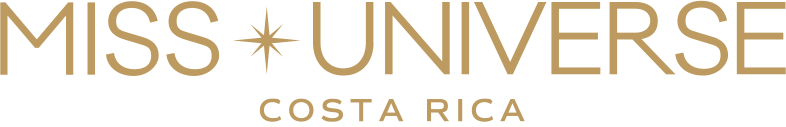
- Formation: 1954; 72 years ago
- Type: Beauty pageant
- Headquarters: San José
- Location: Costa Rica
- Members: Miss Universe
- Official language: Spanish
- National Director: Yessenia Ramírez
- Current titleholder: María Alejandra Acosta
- Staff: Gente OPA

Miss Universe Costa Rica, formerly known as Miss Costa Rica, is a national beauty pageant in Costa Rica. Until 2023, under the direction of Teletica, and from 2024, under the direction of Gente OPA (with which the pageant changes its name), it is responsible for selecting the Costa Rican representative in Miss Universe.

The current Miss Universe Costa Rica is Mahyla Roth from Cahuita, Limón. She was representing the country in Miss Universe 2025. She is the latest representative selected by this pageant.

== History ==
Women of all ages, each representing different provinces and cities in Costa Rica, compete to represent Costa Rica for one year and participate in Miss Universe.

Costa Rica has participated in the Miss Universe pageant since 1954 and has sent 69 representatives in the history of the pageant. The event was broadcast by Teletica from 1960 to 2023. In February 2024, it was reported that Teletica lost the Miss Universe license to ¡Opa!, a television channel established in 2023, which renamed the pageant Miss Universe Costa Rica.

Since 2024, the pageant has had regional franchises, the first being San José, Cartago, Guanacaste, Puntarenas, Pérez Zeledón, Limón, and North Caribbean, which accounted for more than half of the participants in the 2025 pageant.

== Titleholders ==
- : Declared as Winner
- : Ended as runner-up or top 5/6 qualification
- : Ended as one of the finalists or semifinalists
- : Ended as special awards winner

Year	Province	Miss Universe Costa Rica	Placement at Miss Universe	Special awards	Notes
¡OPA! directorship — a franchise holder to Miss Universe from 2024―present (Miss Universo Costa Rica)
2026	Heredia	María Alejandra Acosta			
2025	Limón	Mahyla Roth	Top 30	Miss Photogenic	
2024	San José	Elena Hidalgo	Unplaced		
Teletica directorship — a franchise holder to Miss Universe from 1962―2023 (Miss Costa Rica)
2023	Alajuela	Lisbeth Valverde	Unplaced		
2022	Alajuela	María Fernanda Rodríguez	Unplaced		
2021	Heredia	Valeria Rees	Unplaced		Appointed — Due to the impact of COVID-19 pandemic, no national pageant in 2021.
2020	San José	Ivonne Cerdas	Top 10		
2019	San José	Paola Chacón	Unplaced		
2018	San José	Natalia Carvajal	Top 10		
2017	Heredia	Elena Correa	Unplaced	Best National Costume (Top 16)	Appointed — Miss Costa Rica 2017 did not hold in 2017; the 1st Runner-up of Miss Costa Rica 2016, Elena Correa designated to be the new Miss Costa Rica 2017 and competed at Miss Universe 2017 in the United States.
2016	Alajuela	Carolina Rodríguez	Unplaced		
2015	Limón	Brenda Castro	Unplaced		
2014	Heredia	Karina Ramos	Unplaced		
2013	Guanacaste	Fabiana Granados	Top 16		
2012	Alajuela	Nazareth Cascante	Unplaced		
2011	Heredia	Johanna Solano	Top 10		
2010	Cartago	Marva Wright	Unplaced		
2009	San José	Jessica Umaña	Unplaced		
2008	Alajuela	María Teresa Rodríguez	Unplaced		
2007	Heredia	Verónica González	Unplaced		
2006	San José	Fabriella Quesada	Unplaced		
2005	San José	Johanna Fernández	Unplaced		
2004	Heredia	Nancy Soto	Top 10	Best National Costume (Top 10)	
2003	San José	Andrea Ovares	Unplaced		
2002	Cartago	Merylin Villalta	Unplaced		
2001	San José	Paola Calderón	Unplaced		
2000	San José	Laura Mata	Unplaced		
1999	Alajuela	Arianna Bolaños	Unplaced		
1998	Puntarenas	Kisha Alvarado	Unplaced		
1997	Cartago	Gabriela Aguilar	Unplaced		
1996	Limón	Dafne Zeledón	Unplaced		
1995	Alajuela	Beatriz Alvarado	Unplaced		
1994	Limón	Jasmín Morales	Unplaced		
1993	San José	Catalina Rodríguez	Unplaced		
1992	San José	Jessica Manley	Unplaced		
1991	San José	Viviana Muñoz	Unplaced		
1990	San José	Julieta Posla	Unplaced		
1989	San José	Luana Freer	Unplaced		
1988	Heredia	Erika Paoli	Unplaced		
1987	San José	Ana María Bolaños	Unplaced		
1986	Limón	Aurora Velásquez	Unplaced		
1985	Puntarenas	Rosibel Chacón	Unplaced		
1984	San José	Silvia Portilla	Unplaced		
1983	Cartago	Gabriela Pozuela	Unplaced		
1982	Heredia	Lilliana Corella	Unplaced		
1981	San José	Rosa Inés Solís	Unplaced		
1980	San José	Bárbara Bonilla	Unplaced		
1979	Guanacaste	Carla Facio	Unplaced		
1978	San José	Maribel Guardia	Unplaced	Miss Photogenic	
1977	Puntarenas	Claudia Garnier	Unplaced		
1976	Limón	Silvia Jiménez	Unplaced		
1975	Alajuela	María de los Ángeles Picado	Unplaced		
1974	Limón	Jeannette Rebeca	Unplaced		
1973	Alajuela	María del Rosario Mora	Unplaced		
1972	San José	Victoria Ross	Unplaced		
1971	San José	Rosa María Rivera	Unplaced		
1970	Cartago	Lilliam Berrocal	Unplaced		
1969	San José	Clara Freda	Unplaced		
1968	San José	Ana María Rivera	Unplaced		
1967	Guanacaste	Rosa María Fernández	Unplaced		
1966	Cartago	Virginia Oreamuno	Unplaced		
1965	Guanacaste	Mercedes Pinagal	Unplaced		
1964	San José	Dora Solé	Unplaced		
1963	Cartago	Sandra Chrysopulos	Unplaced		
1962	Heredia	Helvetia Albónico	Unplaced		
1961	Did not compete				
1960	San José	Leila Rodríguez	Unplaced		
1959	Heredia	Sonia Monturiol	Unplaced		
1958	Guanacaste	Eugenia Valverde	Unplaced		Disqualified from the competition.
1957	San José	Sonia Cristina Icaza	Unplaced		
1956	Heredia	Anabella Granados	Unplaced	Miss Congeniality	
1955	San José	Clemencia Martínez	Unplaced		
1954	San José	Marían Esquivel	Top 15		

== See also ==
- Reinas de Costa Rica
