= Cristel Gomez Espinoza =

Costa Rican drug cartel leader

- Born: 5 January 1996 (age 30)
- Other names: "La Reina Del Sur," Kristel Gomez Espinoza
- Occupation: Cartel Leader
- Years active: 2015-2020
- Organization: "El Gringo" Gang

Cristel Yariella Gomez Espinoza (born 5 January 1996), alias "La Reina del Sur" (transl. The Queen of the South), is an alleged narcotics trafficker who is said to have operated drug smuggling operations in Costa Rica before her capture in 2019. She stands accused in a Costa Rican court of trafficking illicit substances and guns from South America through the Panamanian border with Costa Rica.

Gomez was the girlfriend of Irving Guido Toruño, alias "El Gringo", a drug trafficker originally from Nicaragua who ran an operation in Puntarenas, Costa Rica. The two dated for 6 months before El Gringo was murdered in 2017 in what was said to be a revenge killing by a rival operation. After El Gringo's death, Gomez allegedly took over as the leader of his cartel operations.

== Early life ==
Cristel Gomez Espinoza (also known and Kristel) was born on 5 January 1995 in La Cuesta, Costa Rica. Her father is Alberto Gómez Calderón, a notorious drug kingpin who was known for helping smuggle drugs from South America to North America through the Panama border. The family lived in a modest house despite their apparent wealth in order to evade suspicion. She is said to have been exposed to the drug trafficking trade from a very young age, having dropped out of school before high school to assist her father with the family drug business.

In 2009, when she was 13, her father was kidnapped by a rival gang and held for ransom for 6 months before a $500,000 payment was made for his release.

She gave birth to two children as a teenager. Her first child, a girl, was born in 2011 when Gomez was 15 years old. Her 2nd child, a boy, was born in March 2013 when Gomez was 17 years old. Both children from different fathers.

Gomez underwent several plastic surgeries to enhance her appearance, starting with breast implants in 2014. In addition to implants, she underwent procedures for rhinoplasty, and lip fillers.

== Criminal involvement and gang activity ==
In 2015, when Gomez was 19, she was arrested along with 2 other people on suspicion of transporting 15 kilos of heroin. She was found guilty and originally sentenced to 15 years in prison. Her lawyers were able to get a retrial in 2016, and in 2017 she was acquitted of the crime.

While in prison in 2016, she was introduced by a friend to known drug trafficker Erwin Guido known as "El Gringo." The two started dating upon her release in 2017 and it is said this is when her involvement in his larger criminal enterprise began. On calls secretly recorded by federal investigators, Gomez can be heard giving orders for attacks on rival cartels and smuggling operations with members of Guido's gang, including members who were in prison at the time.

Guido was found dead on 16 December 2017, having been thrown on the side of a road in La Sabana, San José. He was reportedly stabbed 139 times, the action was recorded by his attackers and uploaded to social media as a warning. After Guido's death, the ongoing federal investigation on his drug trafficking activities shifted to Gomez and the other members of his cartel. A warrant for Gomez's arrest was issued in November 2018 for trafficking cocaine & guns through Costa Rica for cartels in North America, as well as money laundering.

It is believed that the death of Tatty Matamoros, in December 2018, was linked to an attempted hit on Gomez's life by a rival gang. Matamoros was found dead on the street Vuelta de Jorco de Aserrí in San Jose after she had apparently been thrown out of a moving vehicle. Matamoros had a large blue butterfly tattoo on her forearm which resembled one that Gomez has, it is suspected gang members mistakenly kidnapped Matamoros thinking she was the cartel leader. Matamoros was 20 year old, and a recent immigrant from Nicaragua. She was working as a waitress in San Jose at the time of her murder and she had no record of criminal involvement.

== 2019 arrest ==
Gomez was arrested on 20 August 2019 outside of the Centro Comercial in Palmar Norte shopping center in the Puntarenas province of Costa Rica. She was five months pregnant at the time of her arrest. The arrest came after a tipster called the Fuerza Publica when they spotted her shopping for maternity clothes. The officers asked everyone to produce their cedulas (identification cards), which Gomez said she had left at home and was then detained. She was 24 years old at the time of her arrest.

She gave birth to her second daughter in a private hospital outside the prison. Gomez continued to care for the infant while incarcerated.

== Trial & Sentencing ==
The trial was set to start on 13 July 2021, but was immediately derailed when a melee broke out amongst 36 defendants. The brawl was started when a gang member, who was said to have been the one who turned over El Gringo to the rival gang, entered the court room. The brawl, which was all captured on video, caused the trial to be postponed by one day.

On 14 July 2021, Gomez and 12 other members of her gang pleaded "guilty" to drug trafficking charges in exchange for an expedited trial and the possibility of lighter sentencing. During the trials of Gomez and her alleged accomplices, the judge heard over 5,800 phone calls made by the criminal group including some featuring Gomez's voice ordering out crimes.

The trial took a brief recess in early January 2022, when judges Hannia Soto Arroyo, Raúl Madrigal Lizano and Cristian Espinoza Pizarro authorized a birthday celebration for Gomez. A dozen defendants charged with drug trafficking were allowed to sing happy birthday to Gomez and eat cake on 5 January.

On November 4, 2022, Gomez was sentenced to 19 years in prison by the Criminal Court of the capital San José, along with 23 other cartel members. After the sentence was read, members of Gomez's gang yelled insults and death threats at the judge, including threats to defecate on his mother. Gomez's counsel maintains her innocence and has said she is planning to appeal the case.

The trial of the El Gringo gang was the longest ever in Costa Rica judicial history, lasting nearly two years.
