= List of highways numbered 613 =

The following highways are numbered 613:

== Brazil ==
- SP-613 São Paulo state

== Canada ==
- Alberta Highway 613
- Ontario Highway 613

== Costa Rica ==
- National Route 613

== Saudi Arabia ==
- Dhahran–Jubail Expressway (Highway 613)

== United States ==
- County Route 613 (Lee County, Alabama)
- CR 613 (road located in Indian River County, Florida)
- LA 613
  - LA 613-1
  - LA 613-2
  - LA 613-3
  - LA 613-4
- MS 613
- CR 613 (road located in Middlesex County, New Jersey)
- SR 613
- SR 613
- PR-613
- SR 613

Preceded by 612	Lists of highways 613	Succeeded by 614
