= Canoas District =

District in Puntarenas province, Costa Rica

Canoas
- District
- Interactive map of Canoas
- Canoas district location in Costa Rica
- Coordinates: 8.5644458°N 82.8868569°W
- Country: Costa Rica
- Province: Puntarenas
- Canton: Corredores
- Creation: 19 October 1973

Area
  - Total: 122.54 km^{2} (47.31 sq mi)
- Elevation: 128 m (420 ft)

Population (2011)
  - Total: 11,527
  - Density: 94.067/km^{2} (243.63/sq mi)
- Time zone: UTC−06:00
- Postal code: 61003

Canoas is a district of the Corredores canton, in the Puntarenas province of Costa Rica.

== History ==
Canoas was created on 19 October 1973 by Ley 5373. Segregated from Golfito canton.

== Geography ==
Canoas has an area of 122.54 km^{2} and an elevation of 128 metres.

== Demographics ==
Historical population
Census	Pop.	±% p.a.
1984	5,071	—
2000	8,464	+3.25%
2011	11,527	+2.85%
2022	14,432	+2.06%
Source: Instituto Nacional de Estadística y Censos; Centro Centroamericano de Población

For the 2011 census, Canoas had a population of 11,527 inhabitants.

== Transportation ==
=== Road transportation ===
The district is covered by the following road routes:

- National Route 2
- National Route 238
- National Route 614
