= Pilas District =

District in Buenos Aires canton, Puntarenas province, Costa Rica

Pilas
- District
- Pilas district
- Pilas district location in Costa Rica
- Coordinates: 9.0993501°N 83.4211375°W
- Country: Costa Rica
- Province: Puntarenas
- Canton: Buenos Aires
- Creation: 20 January 1968

Area
  - Total: 114.81 km^{2} (44.33 sq mi)
- Elevation: 250 m (820 ft)

Population (2011)
  - Total: 1,659
  - Density: 14.45/km^{2} (37.43/sq mi)
- Time zone: UTC−06:00
- Postal code: 60305

Pilas is a district of the Buenos Aires canton, in the Puntarenas province of Costa Rica.

== History ==
Pilas was created on 20 January 1968 by Decreto 7. Segregated from Buenos Aires.

== Geography ==
Pilas has an area of 114.81 km^{2} (44.33 sq mi) and an elevation of 250 metres.

== Demographics ==
Historical population
Census	Pop.	±% p.a.
1973	1,505	—
1984	1,597	+0.54%
2000	1,575	−0.09%
2011	1,659	+0.47%
2022	1,522	−0.78%
Source: Instituto Nacional de Estadística y Censos; Centro Centroamericano de Población

For the 2011 census, Pilas had a population of 1,659 inhabitants.
