= Buenos Aires Airport =

Buenos Aires Airport may refer to:

== Argentina ==
There are three main airports with scheduled flights serving the Greater Buenos Aires metropolitan area:

- Aeroparque Jorge Newbery, located in Buenos Aires city proper, with scheduled domestic flights and some regional flights within southern South America (IATA: AEP, ICAO: SABE)
- Ministro Pistarini International Airport, also known as Ezeiza Airport, located 22 km southwest of the city in the municipality of Ezeiza, serving mostly international routes and some domestic flights (IATA: EZE, ICAO: SAEZ)
- El Palomar Airport, located 18km west of the city in the municipality of El Palomar, with a limited number of scheduled domestic flights (IATA: EPA, ICAO: SADP)

There are also two small airports, that mainly deal with private flights, sanitary services, and similar.

- San Fernando Airport (Argentina), located in San Fernando city, about 25 km (15 mi) from Buenos Aires downtown. Is operated by Aeropuertos Argentina 2000 S.A. (ICAO: SADF)
- Morón Airport and Air Base, located about 35 kilometres (22 mi) from Buenos Aires city. It was the main airport in Argentina prior to the opening of Ministro Pistarini International Airport in 1944. (ICAO: SADM)

== Costa Rica ==
- Buenos Aires Airport (Costa Rica), an airport serving Buenos Aires, Costa Rica (IATA: BAI, ICAO: MRBA)

== See also ==
- Buenos Aires International Airport
