= Buenos Aires (canton) =

Canton in Puntarenas province, Costa Rica

- Canton
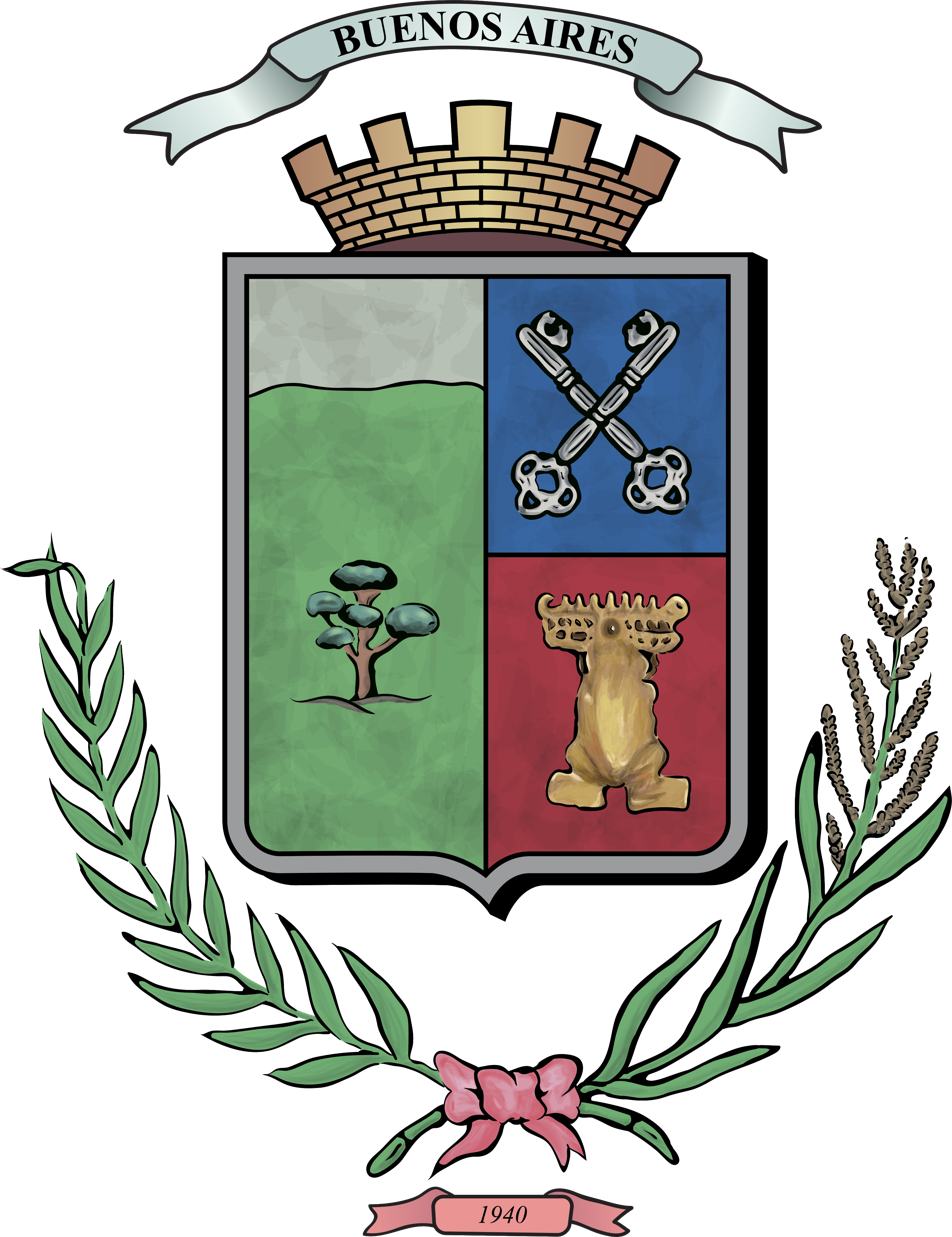
- Flag Seal
- Interactive map of Buenos Aires
- Buenos Aires canton location in Costa Rica
- Coordinates: 9.0824408°N 83.2617871°W
- Country: Costa Rica
- Province: Puntarenas
- Creation: 29 July 1940
- Head city: Buenos Aires
- Districts: Districts: Buenos Aires; Volcán; Potrero Grande; Boruca; Pilas; Colinas; Chánguena; Biolley; Brunka

Government
  - Type: Municipality
  - Body: Municipalidad de Buenos Aires

Area
  - Total: 2,384.22 km^{2} (920.55 sq mi)
- Elevation: 386 m (1,266 ft)

Population (2011)
  - Total: 45,244
  - Density: 18.976/km^{2} (49.149/sq mi)
- Time zone: UTC−06:00
- Canton code: 603
- Website: www.munibuenosaires.go.cr

Buenos Aires is a canton in the Puntarenas province of Costa Rica. The head city is in Buenos Aires district.

== History ==
A law of 26 June 1914, created a canton by the name of "De Osa". This new entity encompassed much of the national territory of southernmost Costa Rica.

Buenos Aires was created on 29 July 1940 by decree 185, segregated from "De Osa". The remaining territorial extension is now Osa canton.

== Geography ==
Buenos Aires has an area of 2,384.22 km^{2} and a mean elevation of 386 metres.

The canton includes a portion of the Cordillera de Talamanca along its northeastern border. The valleys of the General River, Coto Brus River and Térraba River form the core of the canton, and coastal mountain ranges set the limits on the southeast side.

== Districts ==
The canton of Buenos Aires is subdivided into the following districts:

1. Buenos Aires
2. Volcán
3. Potrero Grande
4. Boruca
5. Pilas
6. Colinas
7. Chánguena
8. Biolley
9. Brunka

== Demographics ==
Historical population
Census	Pop.	±% p.a.
1950	7,392	—
1963	11,042	+3.14%
1973	20,104	+6.18%
1984	27,716	+2.96%
2000	40,139	+2.34%
2011	45,244	+1.09%
2022	50,562	+1.02%
Source: Instituto Nacional de Estadística y Censos; Centro Centroamericano de Población

For the 2011 census, Buenos Aires had a population of 45,244 inhabitants.

== Transportation ==
=== Road transportation ===
The canton is covered by the following road routes:

- National Route 2
- National Route 237
- National Route 246
- National Route 331
- National Route 610
- National Route 625
