= Colinas District =

District in Buenos Aires canton, Puntarenas province, Costa Rica

Colinas
- District
- Interactive map of Colinas
- Colinas district location in Costa Rica
- Coordinates: 9.0309812°N 83.463763°W
- Country: Costa Rica
- Province: Puntarenas
- Canton: Buenos Aires
- Creation: 16 August 1968

Area
  - Total: 129.07 km^{2} (49.83 sq mi)
- Elevation: 340 m (1,120 ft)

Population (2011)
  - Total: 1,371
  - Density: 10.62/km^{2} (27.51/sq mi)
- Time zone: UTC−06:00
- Postal code: 60306

Colinas is a district of the Buenos Aires canton, in the Puntarenas province of Costa Rica.

== History ==
Colinas was created on 16 August 1968 by Decreto 31. Segregated from Buenos Aires.

== Geography ==
Colinas has an area of 129.07 km^{2} (49.83 sq mi) and an elevation of 340 metres.

== Demographics ==
Historical population
Census	Pop.	±% p.a.
1973	1,431	—
1984	1,757	+1.88%
2000	1,435	−1.26%
2011	1,371	−0.41%
2022	1,323	−0.32%
Source: Instituto Nacional de Estadística y Censos; Centro Centroamericano de Población

For the 2011 census, Colinas had a population of 1,371 inhabitants.

== Transportation ==
=== Road transportation ===
The district is covered by the following road routes:

- National Route 331
- National Route 625
