= Colobodesmus crucis =

Scientific classification
- Kingdom: Animalia
- Phylum: Arthropoda
- Subphylum: Myriapoda
- Class: Diplopoda
- Order: Polydesmida
- Family: Sphaeriodesmidae
- Genus: Colobodesmus
- Species: C. crucis

Binomial name
- Colobodesmus crucis Loomis, 1974

Species of millipede

Colobodesmus crucis is a species of millipede in the family Sphaeriodesmidae that is endemic to San Vito, Costa Rica, where it was first discovered on 17–18 April 1972 by Harold F. Loomis.

== Description ==
The species is colorless but has a dark median stripe visible internally in preservation. C. crucis is the smallest species of Colobodesmus. Males are 14 millimetres (0.55 in) long and 4 millimetres (0.16 in) wide, while the largest female is 16 millimetres (0.63 in) in length and 5 millimetres (0.20 in) in width. Their labrum and clypeus have 20 setae which go in series. The frontal area that is behind the series have more setae than the back part does. Their first segment is subrectangular, while the anterior part is almost squared. The fourth segment is narrow sided, with the fifth segment is under segment 4 and 6. The posterior margins are almost parallel with the rounded outer one. The gonopods are greatly diverged and are separated by a triangular lobe that comes out from the apex. The opening at the base of the gonopods is almost straight in front and across, while its rim is raised; the sides and back margins are curved.
