= List of highways numbered 610 =

Route 610 or Highway 610 may refer to:

== Canada ==
- Alberta Highway 610
- Manitoba Provincial Road 610
- New Brunswick Route 610
- Ontario Highway 610
- Saskatchewan Highway 610

== Costa Rica ==
- National Route 610

== United Kingdom ==
- A610 road

== United States ==
- Interstate 610
- Maryland Route 610
- Minnesota State Highway 610
- Nevada State Route 610
- North Carolina Highway 610
- Puerto Rico Highway 610
- SR 610

Preceded by 609	Lists of highways 610	Succeeded by 611
