= Playa Zancudo =

- Interactive map of Playa Zancudo
- Coordinates: 08°32′38.59″N 83°08′48.15″W
- Country: Costa Rica
- Province: Puntarenas Province
- Canton: Golfito Canton

Population
  - Total: 450

Playa Zancudo is a village in Puntarenas Province, Costa Rica near the Golfo Dulce. It has a population of approximately 450.

== Geography ==
It is located 9.5 kilometers south of Golfito. Zancudo is located on a long and narrow peninsula, sometime only 100 yards wide, at the mouth of the Rio Colorado. On one side of the peninsula is Zancudo's beach, protected from the full force of Pacific waves, while the other is home to a mangrove swamp. The whole beach is 6 miles long, with the southern three miles of it having jungle and farmland on the east side and most of the town being located within the northernmost mile. The town of Playa Zancudo contains a school, several churches, a soccer field, some Tico restaurants and bars, three sportfishing areas, and a general store.

== History ==
The area around Golfito's port was developed by the United Fruit Company in the 1930s. While this was happening, excess bananas that washed down the Rio Coto river came upon Playa Zancudo's beaches. During this time, pig farms thrived on the leftover bananas. Americans began moving to Zancudo in the 1980s, with the rise in foreign settlement aiding the demise of pig farming in Zancudo.

== Transportation ==
The nearest airport is in Golfito.

The dirt road which connects the community to nearby towns has daily bus service in and out of the town.
