= National Route 617 (Costa Rica) =

National Road Route in Costa Rica

National Tertiary Route 617
- Ruta nacional terciaria 617

Route information
- Maintained by Ministry of Public Works and Transport
- Length: 11.500 km (7.146 mi)

Location
- Country: Costa Rica
- Provinces: Puntarenas

Highway system
- National Road Network of Costa Rica
← Route 616	→ Route 618

National Tertiary Route 617, or just Route 617 (Spanish: Ruta Nacional Terciaria 617, or Ruta 617) is a National Road Route of Costa Rica, located in the Puntarenas province.

== Description ==
In Puntarenas province the route covers Coto Brus canton (Sabalito, Aguabuena districts).
