= Volcán District =

District in Buenos Aires canton, Puntarenas province, Costa Rica

Volcán
- District
- Volcán district
- Volcán district location in Costa Rica
- Coordinates: 9.2469072°N 83.4598999°W
- Country: Costa Rica
- Province: Puntarenas
- Canton: Buenos Aires

Area
  - Total: 187.56 km^{2} (72.42 sq mi)
- Elevation: 418 m (1,371 ft)

Population (2011)
  - Total: 3,815
  - Density: 20.34/km^{2} (52.68/sq mi)
- Time zone: UTC−06:00
- Postal code: 60302

Volcán is a district of the Buenos Aires canton, in the Puntarenas province of Costa Rica.

== Geography ==
Volcán has an area of 187.56 km^{2} (72.42 sq mi) and an elevation of 418 metres.

== Demographics ==
Historical population
Census	Pop.	±% p.a.
1950	1,550	—
1963	2,793	+4.63%
1973	3,589	+2.54%
1984	3,551	−0.10%
2000	6,471	+3.82%
2011	3,815	−4.69%
2022	4,224	+0.93%
Source: Instituto Nacional de Estadística y Censos; Centro Centroamericano de Población

For the 2011 census, Volcán had a population of 3,815 inhabitants.

== Transportation ==
=== Road transportation ===
The district is covered by the following road routes:

- National Route 2
- National Route 610
