= Brunka District =

District in Buenos Aires canton, Puntarenas province, Costa Rica

Brunka
- District
- Interactive map of Brunka
- Brunka district location in Costa Rica
- Coordinates: 9.230426°N 83.3795099°W
- Country: Costa Rica
- Province: Puntarenas
- Canton: Buenos Aires
- Creation: 18 August 2000

Area
  - Total: 162.96 km^{2} (62.92 sq mi)
- Elevation: 391 m (1,283 ft)

Population (2011)
  - Total: 3,220
  - Density: 19.8/km^{2} (51.2/sq mi)
- Time zone: UTC−06:00
- Postal code: 60309

Brunka is a district of the Buenos Aires canton, in the Puntarenas province of Costa Rica.

== History ==
Brunka was created on 18 August 2000 by Acuerdo 719-MSP.

== Geography ==
Brunka has an area of 162.96 km^{2} and an elevation of 391 metres.

== Demographics ==
Historical population
Census	Pop.	±% p.a.
2011	3,220	—
2022	4,327	+2.72%
Source: Instituto Nacional de Estadística y Censos; Centro Centroamericano de Población

For the 2011 census, Brunka had a population of 3,220 inhabitants.

== Transportation ==
=== Road transportation ===
The district is covered by the following road routes:

- National Route 2
- National Route 610
