= Chánguena =

District in Buenos Aires canton, Puntarenas province, Costa Rica

- District
- Interactive map of Chánguena
- Chánguena district location in Costa Rica
- Coordinates: 8.8863741°N 83.1980987°W
- Country: Costa Rica
- Province: Puntarenas
- Canton: Buenos Aires
- Creation: 28 January 1988

Area
  - Total: 273.2 km^{2} (105.5 sq mi)
- Elevation: 820 m (2,690 ft)

Population (2011)
  - Total: 2,631
  - Density: 9.630/km^{2} (24.94/sq mi)
- Time zone: UTC−06:00
- Postal code: 60307

Chánguena is a district of the Buenos Aires canton, in the Puntarenas province of Costa Rica.

== History ==
Chánguena was created on 28 January 1988 by Acuerdo 28.

== Geography ==
Chánguena has an area of 273.2 km^{2} (105.5 sq mi) and an elevation of 820 metres.

== Demographics ==
Historical population
Census	Pop.	±% p.a.
2000	2,715	—
2011	2,631	−0.29%
2022	2,856	+0.75%
Source: Instituto Nacional de Estadística y Censos; Centro Centroamericano de Población

For the 2011 census, Chánguena had a population of 2,631 inhabitants.
