= National Route 625 (Costa Rica) =

National Road Route in Costa Rica

National Tertiary Route 625
- Ruta nacional terciaria 625

Route information
- Maintained by Ministry of Public Works and Transport
- Length: 40.995 km (25.473 mi)

Location
- Country: Costa Rica
- Provinces: Puntarenas

Highway system
- National Road Network of Costa Rica
← Route 624	→ Route 700

National Tertiary Route 625, or just Route 625 (Spanish: Ruta Nacional Terciaria 625, or Ruta 625) is a National Road Route of Costa Rica, located in the Puntarenas province.

== Description ==
In Puntarenas province the route covers Buenos Aires canton (Potrero Grande, Boruca, Colinas districts).
