= List of highways numbered 608 =

Route 608 or Highway 608 may refer to:

== Canada ==
- Alberta Highway 608
- Ontario Highway 608

== Costa Rica ==
- National Route 608

== Malaysia ==
- Malaysia Federal Route 608

== United Kingdom ==
- A608

== United States ==
- SR 608
- KY 608
- LA 608
- MD 608 (former)
- NM 608 (former)
- SR 608
- PA 608
- PR-608
- FM 608
- SR 608

Preceded by 607	Lists of highways 608	Succeeded by 609
