= Corredor District =

District in Puntarenas province, Costa Rica

Corredor
- District
- Interactive map of Corredor
- Corredor district location in Costa Rica
- Coordinates: 8.6084554°N 82.9436875°W
- Country: Costa Rica
- Province: Puntarenas
- Canton: Corredores
- Creation: 19 October 1973

Area
  - Total: 276.37 km^{2} (106.71 sq mi)
- Elevation: 46 m (151 ft)

Population (2011)
  - Total: 17,250
  - Density: 62.42/km^{2} (161.7/sq mi)
- Time zone: UTC−06:00
- Postal code: 61001

Corredor is a district of the Corredores canton, in the Puntarenas province of Costa Rica.

== History ==
Corredor was created on 19 October 1973 by Ley 5373. Segregated from Golfito canton.

== Geography ==
Corredor has an area of 276.37 km^{2} (106.71 sq mi) and an elevation of 46 metres.

== Demographics ==
Historical population
Census	Pop.	±% p.a.
1973	14,452	—
1984	13,846	−0.39%
2000	16,718	+1.19%
2011	17,250	+0.29%
2022	18,997	+0.88%
Source: Instituto Nacional de Estadística y Censos; Centro Centroamericano de Población

For the 2011 census, Corredor had a population of 17,250 inhabitants.

== Transportation ==
=== Road transportation ===
The district is covered by the following road routes:

- National Route 2
- National Route 237
- National Route 238
- National Route 608
- National Route 614
