= Sabalito =

District in Coto Brus canton, Puntarenas province, Costa Rica

- District
- Sabalito district
- Sabalito district location in Costa Rica
- Coordinates: 8.8828164°N 82.8314335°W
- Country: Costa Rica
- Province: Puntarenas
- Canton: Coto Brus
- Creation: 10 December 1965

Area
  - Total: 186.82 km^{2} (72.13 sq mi)
- Elevation: 900 m (3,000 ft)

Population (2011)
  - Total: 10,984
  - Density: 58.795/km^{2} (152.28/sq mi)
- Time zone: UTC−06:00
- Postal code: 60802

Sabalito is a district of the Coto Brus canton, in the Puntarenas province of Costa Rica.

== History ==
Sabalito was created on 10 December 1965 by Ley 3598.

== Geography ==
Sabalito has an area of 186.82 km^{2} (72.13 sq mi) and an elevation of 900 metres.

== Demographics ==
Historical population
Census	Pop.	±% p.a.
1973	5,802	—
1984	9,063	+4.14%
2000	11,084	+1.27%
2011	10,984	−0.08%
2022	13,218	+1.70%
Source: Instituto Nacional de Estadística y Censos; Centro Centroamericano de Población

For the 2011 census, Sabalito had a population of 10,984 inhabitants.

== Transportation ==
=== Road transportation ===
The district is covered by the following road routes:

- National Route 613
- National Route 617

== Economy ==
The local population is mostly employed by the local ranches and farms or in other manual labor.
