= National Route 246 (Costa Rica) =

National Road Route in Costa Rica

National Secondary Route 246
- Ruta nacional secundaria 246

Route information
- Maintained by Ministry of Public Works and Transport
- Length: 6.430 km (3.995 mi)

Location
- Country: Costa Rica
- Provinces: Puntarenas

Highway system
- National Road Network of Costa Rica
← Route 245	→ Route 247

National Secondary Route 246, or just Route 246 (Spanish: Ruta Nacional Secundaria 246, or Ruta 246) is a National Road Route of Costa Rica, located in the Puntarenas province.

== Description ==
In Puntarenas province the route covers Buenos Aires canton (Buenos Aires and Potrero Grande districts) and Coto Brus canton (Pittier district).
