= Coto River =

Coto River may refer to:

- Coto Brus River
- Coto Colorado River
