= Aguabuena =

District in Coto Brus canton, Puntarenas province, Costa Rica

- District
- Interactive map of Aguabuena
- Aguabuena district location in Costa Rica
- Coordinates: 8.7365791°N 82.944169°W
- Country: Costa Rica
- Province: Puntarenas
- Canton: Coto Brus
- Creation: 10 December 1965

Area
  - Total: 63.75 km^{2} (24.61 sq mi)
- Elevation: 1,060 m (3,480 ft)

Population (2011)
  - Total: 6,286
  - Density: 98.60/km^{2} (255.4/sq mi)
- Time zone: UTC−06:00
- Postal code: 60803

Aguabuena is a district of the Coto Brus canton, in the Puntarenas province of Costa Rica.

== History ==
Aguabuena was created on 10 December 1965 by Ley 3598.

== Geography ==
Aguabuena has an area of 63.75 km^{2} (24.61 sq mi) and an elevation of 1,060 metres.

== Demographics ==
Historical population
Census	Pop.	±% p.a.
1973	3,729	—
1984	6,446	+5.10%
2000	6,962	+0.48%
2011	6,286	−0.92%
2022	7,996	+2.21%
Source: Instituto Nacional de Estadística y Censos; Centro Centroamericano de Población

For the 2011 census, Aguabuena had a population of 6,286 inhabitants.

== Transportation ==
=== Road transportation ===
The district is covered by the following road routes:

- National Route 237
- National Route 617
