= Laurel District =

District in Corredores canton, Puntarenas province, Costa Rica

Laurel
- District
- Interactive map of Laurel
- Laurel district location in Costa Rica
- Coordinates: 8.4445263°N 82.971503°W
- Country: Costa Rica
- Province: Puntarenas
- Canton: Corredores
- Creation: 22 August 1995

Area
  - Total: 188.38 km^{2} (72.73 sq mi)
- Elevation: 20 m (66 ft)

Population (2011)
  - Total: 9,148
  - Density: 48.56/km^{2} (125.8/sq mi)
- Time zone: UTC−06:00
- Postal code: 61004

Laurel is a district of the Corredores canton, in the Puntarenas province of Costa Rica.

== History ==
Laurel was created on 22 August 1995 by Ley 7539.

== Geography ==
Laurel has an area of 188.38 km^{2} (72.73 sq mi) and an elevation of 20 metres.

== Demographics ==
Historical population
Census	Pop.	±% p.a.
2000	8,469	—
2011	9,148	+0.70%
2022	12,472	+2.86%
Source: Instituto Nacional de Estadística y Censos; Centro Centroamericano de Población

For the 2011 census, Laurel had a population of 9,148 inhabitants.

== Transportation ==
=== Road transportation ===
The district is covered by the following road routes:

- National Route 238
- National Route 608
- National Route 611
