= List of highways numbered 612 =

The following highways are numbered 612:

== Australia ==
- Bonang Highway, officially rural route C612

== Canada ==
- Ontario Highway 612
- Saskatchewan Highway 612

== Costa Rica ==
- National Route 612

== United States ==
- CR 612
- SR 612
- New Jersey:
  - CR 612
  - CR 612
- NM 612
- PR-612
- SR 612
- WV 612
- AR 612

Preceded by 611	Lists of highways 612	Succeeded by 613
