= Gutiérrez Braun =

District in Coto Brus canton, Puntarenas province, Costa Rica

- District
- Interactive map of Gutiérrez Braun
- Gutiérrez Braun district location in Costa Rica
- Coordinates: 8.9702528°N 82.8775141°W
- Country: Costa Rica
- Province: Puntarenas
- Canton: Coto Brus
- Creation: 31 July 2014

Area
  - Total: 238.38 km^{2} (92.04 sq mi)
- Elevation: 940 m (3,080 ft)
- Time zone: UTC−06:00
- Postal code: 60806

Gutiérrez Braun is a district of the Coto Brus canton, in the Puntarenas province of Costa Rica.

== Toponymy ==
Named after Federico Gutiérrez Braun (1883-1966), an engineer and cartographer. Initially at the moment of the creation on 31 July 2014 the district was erroneously named Gutiérrez Brown, but on 7 April 2015, the name was corrected to its proper and current spelling.

== History ==
Gutiérrez Braun was created on 31 July 2014 by Acuerdo Ejecutivo N° 45-2014-MGP.

== Geography ==
Gutiérrez Braun has an area of 238.38 km^{2} (92.04 sq mi) and an elevation of 940 metres.

== Demographics ==
Historical population
Census	Pop.	±% p.a.
2022	4,974	—
Source: Instituto Nacional de Estadística y Censos; Centro Centroamericano de Población

For the 2011 census, Gutiérrez Braun had not been created, census data will be available in 2021.

== Transportation ==
=== Road transportation ===
The district is covered by the following road routes:

- National Route 612
