= Desmonus pudicus =

Scientific classification
- Kingdom: Animalia
- Phylum: Arthropoda
- Subphylum: Myriapoda
- Class: Diplopoda
- Order: Polydesmida
- Family: Sphaeriodesmidae
- Genus: Desmonus
- Species: D. pudicus

Binomial name
- Desmonus pudicus (Bollman, 1888)

Species of millipede

Desmonus pudicus is a species of flat-backed millipede in the family Sphaeriodesmidae. It is found in North America.
