= La Cuesta =

District in Corredores canton, Puntarenas province, Costa Rica

- District
- Interactive map of La Cuesta
- La Cuesta district location in Costa Rica
- Coordinates: 8.4729654°N 82.871246°W
- Country: Costa Rica
- Province: Puntarenas
- Canton: Corredores
- Creation: 19 October 1973

Area
  - Total: 37.06 km^{2} (14.31 sq mi)
- Elevation: 38 m (125 ft)

Population (2011)
  - Total: 3,906
  - Density: 105.4/km^{2} (273.0/sq mi)
- Time zone: UTC−06:00
- Postal code: 61002

La Cuesta is a district of the Corredores canton, in the Puntarenas province of Costa Rica.

== History ==
La Cuesta was created on 19 October, 1973 by Ley 5373. La Cuesta was segregated from Golfito canton.

== Geography ==
La Cuesta has an area of 37.06 km^{2} (14.31 sq mi) and an elevation of 38 metres.

== Demographics ==
Historical population
Census	Pop.	±% p.a.
1950	3,161	—
1963	17,066	+13.85%
1973	5,195	−11.21%
1984	9,449	+5.59%
2000	3,623	−5.82%
2011	3,906	+0.69%
2022	5,122	+2.49%
Source: Instituto Nacional de Estadística y Censos; Centro Centroamericano de Población

For the 2011 census, La Cuesta had a population of 3,906 inhabitants.

== Transportation ==
=== Road transportation ===
The district is covered by the following road routes:

- National Route 238
- National Route 614
