= Pavón, Costa Rica =

District in Golfito canton, Puntarenas province, Costa Rica

Pavón
- District
- Pavón district
- Pavón district location in Costa Rica
- Coordinates: 8.2980753°N 83.0186035°W
- Country: Costa Rica
- Province: Puntarenas
- Canton: Golfito
- Creation: 13 January 1993

Area
  - Total: 353.26 km^{2} (136.39 sq mi)
- Elevation: 40 m (130 ft)

Population (2011)
  - Total: 6,159
  - Density: 17.43/km^{2} (45.16/sq mi)
- Time zone: UTC−06:00
- Postal code: 60704

Pavón is a district of the Golfito canton, in the Puntarenas province of Costa Rica. The town, also known as Pavones, is located near the mouth of the Golfo Dulce.

== History ==
Pavón was created on 13 January 1993 by Decreto Ejecutivo 21936-G.

== Geography ==
Pavón has an area of 353.26 km^{2} and an elevation of 40 metres.

== Demographics ==
Historical population
Census	Pop.	±% p.a.
2000	5,350	—
2011	6,159	+1.29%
2022	7,206	+1.44%
Source: Instituto Nacional de Estadística y Censos; Centro Centroamericano de Población

For the 2011 census, Pavón had a population of 6,159 inhabitants.

== Transportation ==
=== Road transportation ===
The district is covered by the following road routes:

- National Route 611

== Economy ==
It is around 15 km south of Playa Zancudo. The town is renowned as a surfer's haven with some of the best waves in the world. Sport fishing, hiking, bird watching, wildlife observation and yoga are also popular.
