= National Route 612 (Costa Rica) =

National Road Route in Costa Rica

National Tertiary Route 612
- Ruta nacional terciaria 612

Route information
- Maintained by Ministry of Public Works and Transport
- Length: 31.470 km (19.555 mi)

Major junctions
- South end: Route 237; Route 613
- North end: Santa Elena

Location
- Country: Costa Rica
- Provinces: Puntarenas

Highway system
- National Road Network of Costa Rica
← Route 611	→ Route 613

National Tertiary Route 612, or just Route 612 (Spanish: Ruta Nacional Terciaria 612, or Ruta 612) is a National Road Route of Costa Rica, located in the Puntarenas province. In Puntarenas province the route covers Coto Brus canton (San Vito, Pittier, Gutiérrez Braun districts). As the main road between San Vito town and Elena town on Pittier district, MOPT announced on 22 October 2020 works to improve the road for a total of CRC ₡ 2,988,388,595.20 over 164 days.
