= Sphaeriodesmus filamentosus =

Scientific classification
- Kingdom: Animalia
- Phylum: Arthropoda
- Subphylum: Myriapoda
- Class: Diplopoda
- Order: Polydesmida
- Family: Sphaeriodesmidae
- Genus: Sphaeriodesmus
- Species: S. filamentosus

Binomial name
- Sphaeriodesmus filamentosus Loomis, 1974

Species of millipede

Sphaeriodesmus filamentosus is a species of millipede in the family Sphaeriodesmidae that is endemic to San Vito, Costa Rica. It was discovered on 17–18 April 1972.

== Description ==
S. filamentosus are up to 10 centimetres (3.9 in) in length and 4 millimetres (0.16 in) wide. They have whitish-gray markings on their otherwise colorless body. Their heads are smooth and shiny. The antennal second, third, and fifth joints are almost equal in length, while the sixth one is the longest and the fourth is the shortest. The first segment is almost trapezoidal shaped and is twice as wide and long as the rest. The anterior margin is almost parallel while posterior one is straight and rounded. The frontal lateral margins are divergent. The fifth segment is larger than segment 4. Segments 5–11 have rounded keels. The clypeus have anterior rows of 18–20 setae, each of which is different in length. Behind the clypeus there are 30 more setae, that are scattered on top of front.
