= Limoncito District =

District in Coto Brus canton, Puntarenas province, Costa Rica

Limoncito
- District
- Interactive map of Limoncito
- Limoncito district location in Costa Rica
- Coordinates: 8°51′N 83°03′W
- Country: Costa Rica
- Province: Puntarenas
- Canton: Coto Brus
- Creation: 10 December 1965

Area
  - Total: 124.04 km^{2} (47.89 sq mi)
- Elevation: 780 m (2,560 ft)

Population (2011)
  - Total: 3,591
  - Density: 28.95/km^{2} (74.98/sq mi)
- Time zone: UTC−06:00
- Postal code: 60804

Limoncito is a district of the Coto Brus canton, in the Puntarenas province of Costa Rica.

== History ==
Limoncito was created on 10 December 1965 by Ley 3598.

== Geography ==
Limoncito has an area of 124.04 km^{2} and an elevation of 780 metres.

== Demographics ==
Historical population
Census	Pop.	±% p.a.
1973	3,095	—
1984	3,277	+0.52%
2000	3,448	+0.32%
2011	3,591	+0.37%
2022	4,416	+1.90%
Source: Instituto Nacional de Estadística y Censos; Centro Centroamericano de Población

For the 2011 census, Limoncito had a population of 3,591 inhabitants.

== Transportation ==
=== Road transportation ===
The district is covered by the following road routes:

- National Route 237
