= National Route 14 (Costa Rica) =

National Road Route in Costa Rica

National Primary Route 14
- Ruta nacional primaria 14

Route information
- Maintained by Ministry of Public Works and Transport
- Length: 25.770 km (16.013 mi)

Location
- Country: Costa Rica
- Provinces: Puntarenas

Highway system
- National Road Network of Costa Rica
← Route 10	→ Route 17

National Primary Route 14, or just Route 14 (Spanish: Ruta Nacional Primaria 14, or Ruta 14) is a National Road Route of Costa Rica, located in the Puntarenas province.

== Description ==
In Puntarenas province the route covers Golfito canton (Golfito and Guaycará districts).
