= Potrero Grande District =

District in Buenos Aires canton, Puntarenas province, Costa Rica

Potrero Grande
- District
- Potrero Grande district
- Potrero Grande district location in Costa Rica
- Coordinates: 9.1020612°N 83.1654336°W
- Country: Costa Rica
- Province: Puntarenas
- Canton: Buenos Aires

Area
  - Total: 626.4 km^{2} (241.9 sq mi)
- Elevation: 183 m (600 ft)

Population (2011)
  - Total: 5,956
  - Density: 9.508/km^{2} (24.63/sq mi)
- Time zone: UTC−06:00
- Postal code: 60303

Potrero Grande is a district of the Buenos Aires canton, in the Puntarenas province of Costa Rica.

== Geography ==
Potrero Grande has an area of 626.4 km^{2} (241.9 sq mi) and an elevation of 183 metres.

== Demographics ==
Historical population
Census	Pop.	±% p.a.
1927	713	—
1950	1,222	+2.37%
1963	2,576	+5.90%
1973	5,700	+8.27%
1984	9,655	+4.91%
2000	5,162	−3.84%
2011	5,956	+1.31%
2022	7,450	+2.06%
Source: Instituto Nacional de Estadística y Censos; Centro Centroamericano de Población

For the 2011 census, Potrero Grande had a population of 5,956 inhabitants.

== Transportation ==
=== Road transportation ===
The district is covered by the following road routes:

- National Route 2
- National Route 237
- National Route 246
- National Route 625
