= National Route 614 (Costa Rica) =

National Road Route in Costa Rica

National Tertiary Route 614
- Ruta nacional terciaria 614

Route information
- Maintained by Ministry of Public Works and Transport
- Length: 20.940 km (13.012 mi)

Location
- Country: Costa Rica
- Provinces: Puntarenas

Highway system
- National Road Network of Costa Rica
← Route 613	→ Route 615

National Tertiary Route 614, or just Route 614 (Spanish: Ruta Nacional Terciaria 614, or Ruta 614) is a National Road Route of Costa Rica, located in the Puntarenas province.

== Description ==
In Puntarenas province the route covers Corredores canton (Corredor, La Cuesta, Canoas districts).
