= Biolley =

District in Buenos Aires canton, Puntarenas province, Costa Rica

- District
- Interactive map of Biolley
- Biolley district location in Costa Rica
- Coordinates: 9.0617508°N 83.0517382°W
- Country: Costa Rica
- Province: Puntarenas
- Canton: Buenos Aires
- Creation: 7 November 1995

Area
  - Total: 208.71 km^{2} (80.58 sq mi)
- Elevation: 160 m (520 ft)

Population (2011)
  - Total: 2,455
  - Density: 11.76/km^{2} (30.47/sq mi)
- Time zone: UTC−06:00
- Postal code: 60308

Biolley is a district of the Buenos Aires canton, in the Puntarenas province of Costa Rica.

== History ==
Biolley was created on 7 November 1995 by Decreto Ejecutivo 24470-G.

== Geography ==
Biolley has an area of 208.71 km^{2} (80.58 sq mi) and an elevation of 160 metres.

== Demographics ==
Historical population
Census	Pop.	±% p.a.
2000	3,068	—
2011	2,455	−2.01%
2022	2,890	+1.49%
Source: Instituto Nacional de Estadística y Censos; Centro Centroamericano de Población

For the 2011 census, Biolley had a population of 2,455 inhabitants.
