= Guaycará =

District in Golfito canton, Puntarenas province, Costa Rica

- District
- Interactive map of Guaycará
- Guaycará district location in Costa Rica
- Coordinates: 8.684584°N 83.083348°W
- Country: Costa Rica
- Province: Puntarenas
- Canton: Golfito
- Creation: 26 November 1971

Area
  - Total: 323.11 km^{2} (124.75 sq mi)
- Elevation: 50 m (160 ft)

Population (2011)
  - Total: 12,918
  - Density: 39.980/km^{2} (103.55/sq mi)
- Time zone: UTC−06:00
- Postal code: 60703

Guaycará is a district of the Golfito canton, in the Puntarenas province of Costa Rica.

== History ==
Guaycará was created on 26 November 1971 by Decreto Ejecutivo 2074-G .

== Geography ==
Guaycará has an area of 323.11 km^{2} (124.75 sq mi) and an elevation of 50 metres.

== Locations ==
The entrance to the Piedras Blancas National Park is in the village of La Gamba in this district.

== Demographics ==
Historical population
Census	Pop.	±% p.a.
1973	7,021	—
1984	9,340	+2.63%
2000	11,456	+1.28%
2011	12,918	+1.10%
2022	15,176	+1.48%
Source: Instituto Nacional de Estadística y Censos; Centro Centroamericano de Población

For the 2011 census, Guaycará had a population of 12,918 inhabitants.

== Transportation ==
=== Road transportation ===
The district is covered by the following road routes:

- National Route 2
- National Route 14
