= National Route 238 (Costa Rica) =

National Road Route in Costa Rica

National Secondary Route 238
- Ruta nacional secundaria 238

Route information
- Maintained by Ministry of Public Works and Transport
- Length: 50.990 km (31.684 mi)

Location
- Country: Costa Rica
- Provinces: Puntarenas

Highway system
- National Road Network of Costa Rica
| ← Route 237 | → Route 239 |

National Secondary Route 238, or just Route 238 (Spanish: Ruta Nacional Secundaria 238, or Ruta 238) is a National Road Route of Costa Rica, located in the Puntarenas province.

== Description ==
In Puntarenas province the route covers Golfito canton (Golfito district) and Corredores canton (Corredor, La Cuesta, Canoas, and Laurel districts).
