= Pittier District =

District in Coto Brus canton, Puntarenas province, Costa Rica

Pittier
- District
- Pittier district
- Pittier district location in Costa Rica
- Coordinates: 8.9898212°N 82.9651152°W
- Country: Costa Rica
- Province: Puntarenas
- Canton: Coto Brus
- Creation: 29 November 1988

Area
  - Total: 255.23 km^{2} (98.54 sq mi)
- Elevation: 1,040 m (3,410 ft)

Population (2011)
  - Total: 2,758
  - Density: 10.81/km^{2} (27.99/sq mi)
- Time zone: UTC−06:00
- Postal code: 60805

Pittier is a district of the Coto Brus canton, in the Puntarenas province of Costa Rica.

== History ==
Pittier was created on 29 November 1988 by Acuerdo 428.

== Geography ==
Pittier has an area of 255.23 km^{2} (98.54 sq mi) and an elevation of 1,040 metres.

== Demographics ==
Historical population
Census	Pop.	±% p.a.
2000	3,057	—
2011	2,758	−0.93%
2022	3,013	+0.81%
Source: Instituto Nacional de Estadística y Censos; Centro Centroamericano de Población

For the 2011 census, Pittier had a population of 2,758 inhabitants.

== Transportation ==
=== Road transportation ===
The district is covered by the following road routes:

- National Route 246
- National Route 612
