= List of highways numbered 607 =

Route 607 or Highway 607 may refer to:

== Costa Rica ==
- National Route 607

== United States ==
- SR 607
- SR 607
- MD 607
- MS 607
- SR 607
- SR 607
- PA 607
- PR-607
- SR 607

Preceded by 606	Lists of highways 607	Succeeded by 608
