= List of highways numbered 611 =

The following highways are numbered 611:

== Afghanistan ==
- Route 611

== Canada ==
- Alberta Highway 611
- Manitoba Provincial Road 611
- Ontario Highway 611
- Saskatchewan Highway 611

== Costa Rica ==
- National Route 611

== United States ==
- US 611 (former)
- SR 611
- LA 611
  - LA 611-1
  - LA 611-2
  - LA 611-3
  - LA 611-4
  - LA 611-5
  - LA 611-6
  - LA 611-7
  - LA 611-8
  - LA 611-9
  - LA 611-10
  - LA 611-11
  - LA 611-12
  - LA 611-13
- MD 611
- SR 611
- PA 611
- PR-611
- SR 611

== United Arab Emirates ==
- E 611 road (United Arab Emirates), also known as the Dubai Bypass Road

Preceded by 610	Lists of highways 611	Succeeded by 612
