= Boruca District =

District in Buenos Aires canton, Puntarenas province, Costa Rica

Boruca
- District
- Interactive map of Boruca
- Boruca district location in Costa Rica
- Coordinates: 9.0147424°N 83.3231441°W
- Country: Costa Rica
- Province: Puntarenas
- Canton: Buenos Aires

Area
  - Total: 125.02 km^{2} (48.27 sq mi)
- Elevation: 550 m (1,800 ft)

Population (2011)
  - Total: 3,074
  - Density: 24.59/km^{2} (63.68/sq mi)
- Time zone: UTC−06:00
- Postal code: 60304

Boruca is a district of the Buenos Aires canton, in the Puntarenas province of Costa Rica.

== Geography ==
Boruca has an area of 125.02 km^{2} (48.27 sq mi) and an elevation of 550 metres.

== Demographics ==
Historical population
Census	Pop.	±% p.a.
1883	335	—
1927	352	+0.11%
1950	513	+1.65%
1963	1,049	+5.66%
1973	1,892	+6.08%
1984	2,861	+3.83%
2011	3,074	+0.27%
2022	3,351	+0.79%
Source: Instituto Nacional de Estadística y Censos; Centro Centroamericano de Población

For the 2011 census, Boruca had a population of 3,074 inhabitants.

== Transportation ==
=== Road transportation ===
The district is covered by the following road routes:

- National Route 2
- National Route 625
