= National Route 610 (Costa Rica) =

National Road Route in Costa Rica

National Tertiary Route 610
- Ruta nacional terciaria 610

Route information
- Maintained by Ministry of Public Works and Transport
- Length: 21.240 km (13.198 mi)

Location
- Country: Costa Rica
- Provinces: Puntarenas

Highway system
- National Road Network of Costa Rica
← Route 609	→ Route 611

National Tertiary Route 610, or just Route 610 (Spanish: Ruta Nacional Terciaria 610, or Ruta 610) is a National Road Route of Costa Rica, located in the Puntarenas province.

== Description ==
In Puntarenas province the route covers Buenos Aires canton (Buenos Aires, Volcán, Brunka districts).
