= List of highways numbered 609 =

Route 609 or Highway 609 may refer to:

== Canada ==
- Alberta Highway 609

== Costa Rica ==
- National Route 609

== United States ==
- Kentucky Route 609
- Louisiana Highway 609
- New Mexico State Road 609
- Ohio State Route 609
- Texas
  - Farm to Market Road 609
- Virginia State Route 609

Preceded by 608	Lists of highways 609	Succeeded by 610
