= Colobodesmus =

Scientific classification
- Kingdom: Animalia
- Phylum: Arthropoda
- Subphylum: Myriapoda
- Class: Diplopoda
- Order: Polydesmida
- Family: Sphaeriodesmidae
- Genus: Colobodesmus; Brolemann, 1905

Species
- Colobodesmus biolleyi Brolemann, 1905; Colobodesmus cobanus (Chamberlin, 1952); Colobodesmus crucis Loomis, 1974; Colobodesmus triramus Kraus, 1954

Genus of millipedes

Colobodesmus is a genus of millipedes in the family Sphaeriodesmidae.
