= National Route 607 (Costa Rica) =

National Road Route in Costa Rica

National Tertiary Route 607
- Ruta nacional terciaria 607

Route information
- Maintained by Ministry of Public Works and Transport
- Length: 8.715 km (5.415 mi)

Location
- Country: Costa Rica
- Provinces: Puntarenas

Highway system
- National Road Network of Costa Rica
← Route 606	→ Route 608

National Tertiary Route 607, or just Route 607 (Spanish: Ruta Nacional Terciaria 607, or Ruta 607) is a National Road Route of Costa Rica, located in the Puntarenas province.

== Description ==
In Puntarenas province the route covers Parrita canton (Parrita district).
