= National Route 613 (Costa Rica) =

National Road Route in Costa Rica

National Tertiary Route 613
- Ruta nacional terciaria 613

Route information
- Maintained by Ministry of Public Works and Transport
- Length: 30.865 km (19.179 mi)

Location
- Country: Costa Rica
- Provinces: Puntarenas

Highway system
- National Road Network of Costa Rica
← Route 612	→ Route 614

National Tertiary Route 613, or just Route 613 (Spanish: Ruta Nacional Terciaria 613, or Ruta 613) is a National Road Route of Costa Rica, located in the Puntarenas province.

== Description ==
In Puntarenas province the route covers Coto Brus canton (San Vito, Sabalito districts).
