= Desmonus =

Scientific classification
- Kingdom: Animalia
- Phylum: Arthropoda
- Subphylum: Myriapoda
- Class: Diplopoda
- Order: Polydesmida
- Family: Sphaeriodesmidae
- Genus: Desmonus; Cook, 1898

Genus of millipedes

Desmonus is a genus of flat-backed millipedes in the family Sphaeriodesmidae. There are about 10 described species in Desmonus.

== Species ==
These 10 species belong to the genus Desmonus:

- Desmonus acclivus (Loomis, 1966)
- Desmonus atophus (Chamberlin & Mulaik, 1941)
- Desmonus austrus Causey, 1958
- Desmonus conjunctus Loomis, 1959
- Desmonus crassus Loomis, 1959
- Desmonus curtus (Loomis, 1943)
- Desmonus distinctus Loomis, 1959
- Desmonus earlei Cook, 1898
- Desmonus inordinatus Causey, 1958
- Desmonus pudicus (Bollman, 1888)
