= National Route 700 (Costa Rica) =

National Road Route in Costa Rica

National Tertiary Route 700
- Ruta nacional terciaria 700

Route information
- Maintained by Ministry of Public Works and Transport
- Length: 3.37 km (2.09 mi)

Major junctions
- West end: Route 35
- East end: Route 141

Location
- Country: Costa Rica
- Provinces: Alajuela

Highway system
- National Road Network of Costa Rica
← Route 625	→ Route 702

National Tertiary Route 700, or just Route 700 (Spanish: Ruta Nacional Terciaria 700, or Ruta 700) is a National Road Route of Costa Rica, located in the Alajuela province.

== Description ==
In Alajuela province the route covers San Carlos canton (Quesada district).

== Junction list ==
The route is entirely in Quesada district.

km	mi	Destinations	Notes
0	0	Route 35	Segment in construction.
3.37	2.09	Route 141	

== History ==
Route created in 2020 over an existing road between Route 141 and the in construction south segment of Route 35.
