= National Route 611 (Costa Rica) =

National Road Route in Costa Rica

National Tertiary Route 611
- Ruta nacional terciaria 611

Route information
- Maintained by Ministry of Public Works and Transport
- Length: 18.990 km (11.800 mi)

Location
- Country: Costa Rica
- Provinces: Puntarenas

Highway system
- National Road Network of Costa Rica
← Route 610	→ Route 612

National Tertiary Route 611, or just Route 611 (Spanish: Ruta Nacional Terciaria 611, or Ruta 611) is a National Road Route of Costa Rica, located in the Puntarenas province.

== Description ==
In Puntarenas province the route covers Golfito canton (Pavón district) and Corredores canton (Laurel district).
