= Buenos Aires Airport (Costa Rica) =

- IATA: BAI; ICAO: MRBA

Summary
- Airport type: Public
- Serves: Buenos Aires, Costa Rica
- Elevation AMSL: 1,214 ft / 370 m
- Coordinates: 9°9′50″N 83°19′49″W

Map
- Location of the airport in Costa Rica

Runways
Direction	Length		Surface
Direction	m	ft	Surface
01/19	958	3,143	Concrete
- Sources: WAD Google Maps GCM SkyVector

Buenos Aires Airport (IATA: BAI, ICAO: MRBA) is an airport serving Buenos Aires, a city in the Puntarenas Province of Costa Rica.

There is mountainous terrain northwest through east of the airport.

The Limon VOR-DME (Ident: LIO) is located 51.2 nautical miles (95 km) north-northeast of the airport.

== See also ==
- Transport in Costa Rica
- List of airports in Costa Rica
