= National Route 237 (Costa Rica) =

National Road Route in Costa Rica

National Secondary Route 237
- Ruta nacional secundaria 237

Route information
- Maintained by Ministry of Public Works and Transport
- Length: 78.975 km (49.073 mi)

Location
- Country: Costa Rica
- Provinces: Puntarenas

Highway system
- National Road Network of Costa Rica
| ← Route 236 | → Route 238 |

National Secondary Route 237, or just Route 237 (Spanish: Ruta Nacional Secundaria 237, or Ruta 237) is a National Road Route of Costa Rica, located in the Puntarenas province.

== Description ==
In Puntarenas province the route covers Buenos Aires canton (Potrero Grande district), Coto Brus canton (San Vito, Aguabuena, and Limoncito districts), and Corredores canton (Corredor district).

== History ==
This route was severely damaged in November 2020 due to the indirect effects of Hurricane Eta.
