= National Route 608 (Costa Rica) =

National Road Route in Costa Rica

National Tertiary Route 608
- Ruta nacional terciaria 608

Route information
- Maintained by Ministry of Public Works and Transport
- Length: 28.970 km (18.001 mi)

Location
- Country: Costa Rica
- Provinces: Puntarenas

Highway system
- National Road Network of Costa Rica
← Route 607	→ Route 609

National Tertiary Route 608, or just Route 608 (Spanish: Ruta Nacional Terciaria 608, or Ruta 608) is a National Road Route of Costa Rica, located in the Puntarenas province.

== Description ==
In Puntarenas province the route covers Corredores canton (Corredor, Laurel districts).
