= Temporary Migrant Care Center =

Migrant detention facility in Costa Rica

- Location: Corredores, Puntarenas, Costa Rica
- Status: Operational
- Capacity: 300
- Opened: October 2023
- Managed by: Directorate General of Immigration and Nationality

The Temporary Migrant Care Center (Note: Also translated as the Migrant Attention Center or the Migrant Care Center in various sources.) (Spanish: Centro de Atención Temporal a Migrantes, abbreviated CATEM) is a migrant detention and processing facility located in Corredores, Puntarenas, Costa Rica.

CATEM came under increased scrutiny following President Rodrigo Chaves Robles' decision to accept 200 migrants not of Costa Rican nationality renditioned from the United States and detain them at CATEM. Prior to this, the facility had been used to serve northbound migrants in transit through Costa Rica.

== Background ==
In 2023, the number of migrants crossing into Costa Rica via its southern border increased significantly. In June, daily crossings were reported at 900, which increased to nearly 2,700 in August. Costa Rican authorities had previously implemented a bus transportation program that would take migrants to Los Chiles along the Costa Rica-Nicaragua border for a US$30 fee in order to reduce the impact of migration on locals. However, migrants who could not afford the bus remained stuck in border areas. Some migrants began working as street vendors to raise the money required to pay for bus transport, leading to a confrontation with police.

On 26 September 2023, following the confrontation, President Chaves Robles announced a national emergency. Commentators opined that the emergency declaration, emblematic of the president's "confrontational and polarizing" style, was a tactic intended to turn the situation into an opportunity to build political legitimacy.

== History ==
The industrial facility that would become CATEM was donated to Costa Rica by the German stationery company Faber-Castell in 2018. According to former communications minister Mauricio Herrera, the donation was made under the condition that the facility not be used to detain migrants.

In October 2023, Costa Rica and Panama came to a bilateral agreement to transport migrants who had crossed the Darien Gap in Panama directly to CATEM by bus for a fee. From there, migrants would again be transported by bus to the Costa Rica-Nicaragua border crossing for an additional fee. The intent was "for [Costa Rican] citizens to barely notice these migrant movements", according to Chaves Robles. Costa Rican authorities estimated that the buses could move up to 3,000 migrants to the northern border crossing per day.

== Facility ==
CATEM is located on 25 acres of farmland. The property is enclosed by a fence. The main facility consists of dormitories, a dining area, bathrooms, and common areas. There is also a store where migrants can purchase food and essential items. News reports indicated that the dormitory areas were constructed inside of shipping containers, adapted to house and detain migrants through the addition of doors, windows, and lockers. Ventilation is poor and there is no air conditioning, despite the considerable humidity and local temperatures often in excess of 90 °F (32 °C).

In March 2024, UNICEF announced the opening of a Child-Friendly Safe Space at CATEM. The funding for the Safe Space was provided by the French Embassy in Costa Rica. Various agencies were involved in the creation of the space, primarily the Child Welfare Agency (PANI), with support from the National Directorate of Community Development, the Directorate General of Immigration and Nationality (DGME), and UNICEF. According to UNICEF, these spaces provide migrant children with psychological support and opportunities for growth and development in the face of the adversity of migration.

== Role in renditions from the United States ==
In February 2025, the Costa Rican government agreed to receive 200 migrants renditioned from the United States to be detained at CATEM. The costs of the operation were covered by the United States. Of the agreement, President Chaves Robles said, "we are helping the economically powerful brother from the north who, if he puts a tax on the free trade zones, will wreck us." Chaves Robles' remark followed a conflict between Colombia and the United States in January 2025 in which U.S. President Donald Trump threatened Colombian President Gustavo Petro with tariffs over Colombia's initial refusal to accept Colombians deported from the United States due to their arrival on military, as opposed to civilian, aircraft.

On 20 February 2025, the first group of 135 migrants, including dozens of children, arrived at Juan Santamaria International Airport. They were immediately transferred to CATEM by bus. According to the Costa Rican Ombudsman's Office, the migrants did not even know to which country they had been sent and had their passports seized upon arrival. Head of the DGME Omer Badilla stated that the migrants were mostly families rather than single individuals and that at least 13 different nationalities were represented among them, including Afghanistan, Armenia, Azerbaijan, China, Georgia, Ghana, India, Iran, Jordan, Kazakhstan, Nepal, Pakistan, Russia, Turkey, Uzbekistan, and Vietnam. Minister of Security Mario Zamora claimed the migrants would stay at CATEM for four to six weeks while arrangements are made for their repatriation. On 25 February 2025, the second group of 65 migrants arrived in Costa Rica.

In March 2025, Human Rights Watch called on Foreign Minister Arnoldo Andre Tinoco to commit to allowing renditioned migrants to seek asylum in Costa Rica before the Legislative Assembly and to make public the deal struck with the U.S. to accept renditioned migrants.

In April 2025, it was reported that some migrants detained at CATEM escaped the facility. Authorities in Costa Rica sent out an alert to help locate the migrants and return them to CATEM. Another group of migrants left the facility after being permitted to seek asylum in Costa Rica. Later that month, following the progression of a lawsuit filed against Costa Rica before the United Nations Committee on the Rights of the Child, the government returned the migrants' passports and allowed them freedom of movement within the country.

In June 2025, the Constitutional Court, under Costa Rica's Supreme Court of Justice, ruled that the detention of migrants renditioned from the United States at CATEM was legally improper. The ruling was in response to a habeas corpus petition filed by Herrera. The Court also ordered the government to regularize the immigration status of the migrants and to release those who remained in the facility. Badilla protested the decision, calling it a "serious error", while Refugees International said it served as "a warning to the Costa Rican government not to collaborate with the United States on deportation deals that violate the human rights of migrants". Most of the migrants were ultimately repatriated to their countries of origin.
