= Golfito =

District in Golfito canton, Puntarenas province, Costa Rica

- District
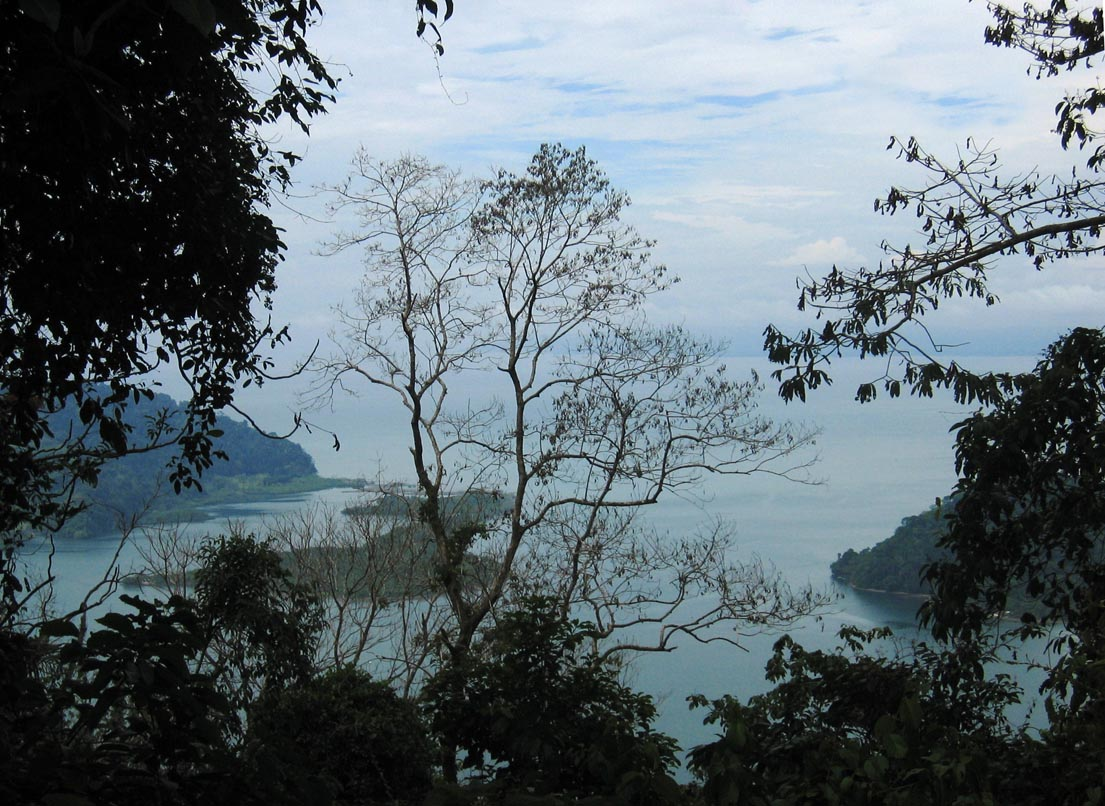
- A view of Golfito bay from the hill behind Golfito town, with Playa Cacao to the right and the Golfo Dulce in the background (beyond the peninsula)
- Interactive map of Golfito
- Golfito district location in Costa Rica
- Coordinates: 8.652603°N 83.1733158°W
- Country: Costa Rica
- Province: Puntarenas
- Canton: Golfito

Area
  - Total: 357.32 km^{2} (137.96 sq mi)
- Elevation: 5 m (16 ft)

Population (2011)
  - Total: 11,284
  - Density: 31.580/km^{2} (81.791/sq mi)
- Time zone: UTC−06:00
- Postal code: 60701

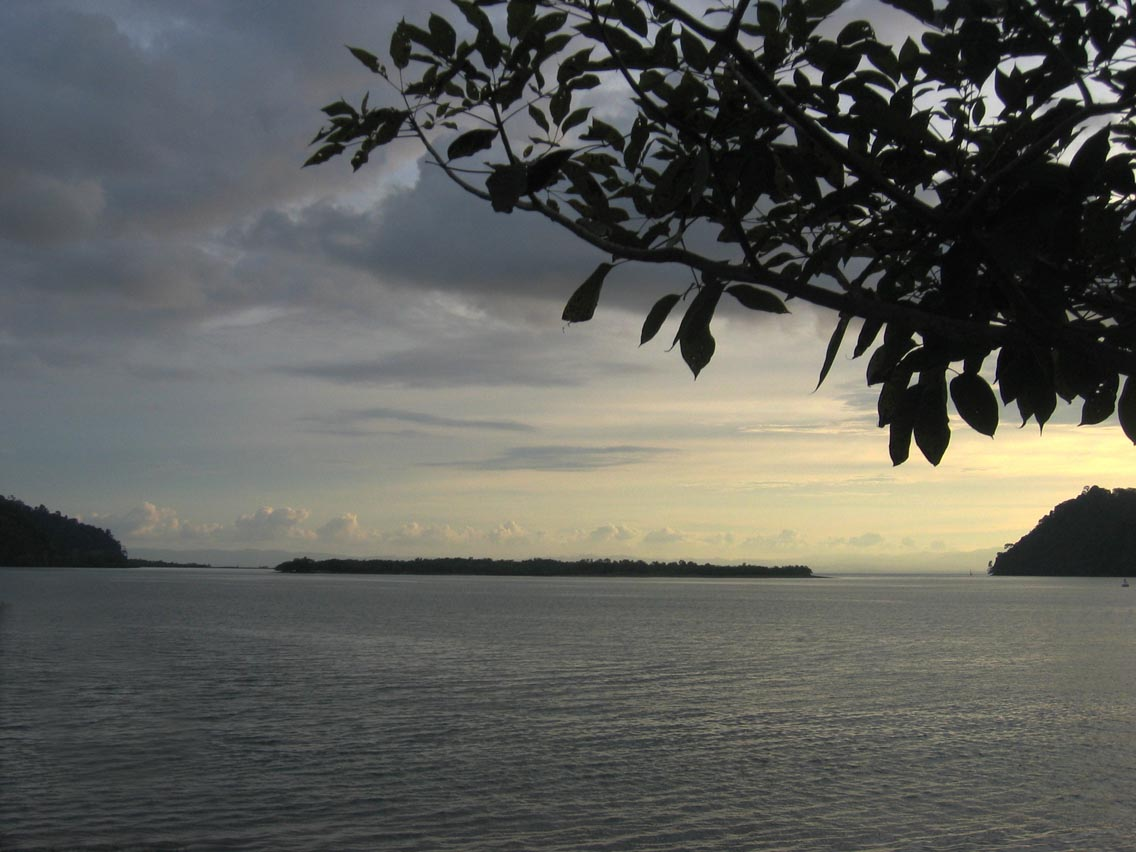
Another view of Golfito bay from the road between the southern and middle sections of town, with the same peninsula as in the above photograph in the center

Golfito is a district and port town of the Golfito canton, in the Puntarenas province of Costa Rica, located on the southern Pacific Coast, near the border of Panama.

== Toponymy ==
Literally translated as 'little gulf'.

== Geography ==
Golfito has an area of 357.32 km^{2} and an elevation of 5 metres.

From the northern section, which was the old United Fruit Company headquarters, trails go up to the Golfito Mixed Wildlife Refuge on the hill, which is part of the National System of Conservation Areas. Tall, 30–45 meters [98–148 ft] high, evergreen rain forests surround the coastal lowlands around the town. The region receives an average of 400–500 centimeters (160–200 in) of rainfall annually.

Golfito Bay is within the larger Golfo Dulce, and separated from the open Pacific Ocean by the Osa Peninsula. Ferry boats cross the Golfo Dulce from Golfito to Puerto Jimenez, which is an access point to the Osa Peninsula and Corcovado National Park.

The town lies on a narrow strip of land between the eponymous bay and a hill and consists of two parts, the town proper and shopping area to the south, and a residential area near the port.

== Demographics ==
Historical population
Census	Pop.	±% p.a.
1927	1,195	—
1950	6,062	+7.32%
1963	17,923	+8.70%
1973	13,611	−2.71%
1984	14,937	+0.85%
2000	10,915	−1.94%
2011	11,284	+0.30%
2022	11,060	−0.18%
Source: Instituto Nacional de Estadística y Censos; Centro Centroamericano de Población

At the 2011 census, Golfito had a population of 11,284 inhabitants.

== Transportation ==
=== Road transportation ===
The district is covered by the following road routes:

- National Route 14
- National Route 238

=== Airport ===
- Golfito Airport airstrip.

== Economy ==
=== Agriculture ===
In the mid-20th century, Golfito was a major banana growing region (also resulting in it being a major port of southern Costa Rica), but a combination of worker unrest, declining foreign markets, rising export taxes and banana disease led to the closing of the United Fruit Company in 1985. Palm oil plantations have replaced the old banana plantations and, due to their success, more and more land is devoted to growing this palm. A small flow of tourists began to arrive in the mid-1990s, and by mid-2006 sport fishing had become the most important tourist attraction.

=== Duty free shopping centre ===
The Golfito duty free shopping centre (Depósito Libre Comercial de Golfito), with forty nine retail stores, attracts shoppers from other regions of the country, with the caveats that it is limited to a sum of up to US$1000 annually per person and that the individuals have to stay at least a night in the area, as there is a shopping permit that should be acquired the day before doing the shopping. Doing so promotes the local hospitality and tourism business in the area. This shopping centre was created in 1986 as the banana production ceased in the area.

=== Tourism ===
The beaches in the region provides for tourist activities, even during the tide fluctuation, which averages about 3 meters (9.8 ft).

==== Fishing and boating ====
The town offers small marinas, yachting and boating services, sport fishing, and a destination for cruise ships. Much of the tourism in the Golfito area focuses on the sport fishing industry. Many of the lodges and hotels have their own sport fishing boats and captains. Yachting, boating, water sports and beach activities are also possible. The beaches south of Golfito — Playa Zancudo, Pilon and Pavones — offer excellent surfing.

The controversial approval of permits for construction of a new big marina in Golfito was an unsuccessful process that lasted over nine years. Environmentalists and local residents opposed the project. Among the issues were the lack of a scientific study to determine the environmental impact of anti-fouling paint, sewage and oil spillage, and the lack of space to install a water treatment plant. The Regulatory Office for Marinas in Costa Rica (CIMAT) ordered the Golfito Municipality, in early 2010, to withdraw all permits for this marina project.

==== Tours ====
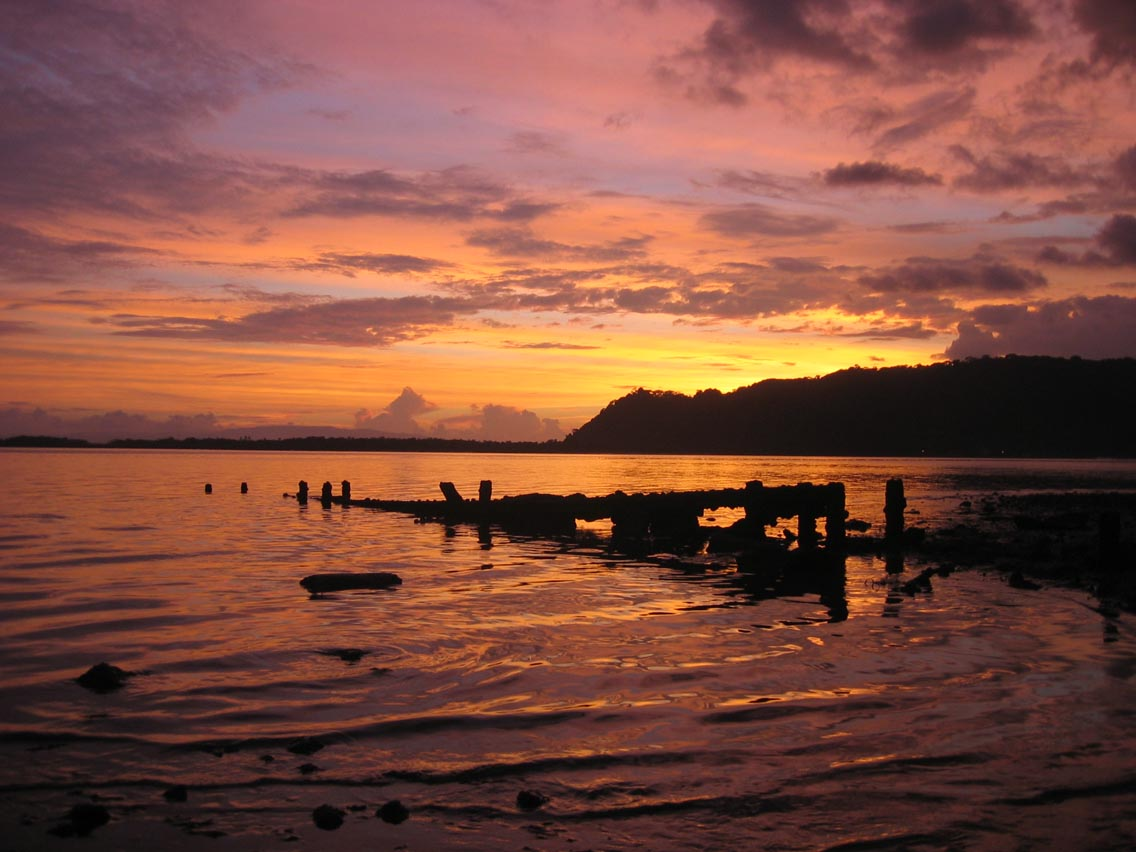
Sunset over Golfito Bay

Golfito offers many outdoor activities, such as Dolphin and whale watching boat tours, horseback riding, hiking tours to the Golfito Wildlife Refuge or the Piedras Blancas National Park. It is also a famous location for bird watching tours and sportfishing.

== Education ==
The town of Golfito has five primary schools, one secondary school that also offers a separate night schooling. The University of Costa Rica has a branch campus in Golfito where students mostly from the region attend. As a public university, UCR-Golfito offers scholarships and housing to about 90% of its students. UCR-Golfito has student housing facilities (called Bachers), a library, laboratories, and a student union called Club Centro, where art and recreational activities take place.
