= General River =

River in Costa Rica

General River is a river of Costa Rica.
