= Louisiana Highway 613 =

State highway in Louisiana, United States

Louisiana Highway 613

Route information
- Maintained by Louisiana DOTD
- Existed: 1955 renumbering–2010

Location
- Country: United States
- State: Louisiana
- Parishes: Jefferson, Orleans

Highway system
- Louisiana State Highway System; Interstate; US; State; Scenic
← LA 612	→ LA 614

Louisiana Highway 613 (LA 613) was a collection of four state-maintained streets in Metairie and New Orleans established with the 1955 Louisiana Highway renumbering. All four routes have since been deleted from the state highway system.

== Louisiana Highway 613-1 ==
Louisiana Highway 613-1
- Location: Metairie
- Length: 0.37 mi (600 m)
- Existed: 1955–2010

From the west, LA 613-1 began at Chickasaw Street in the section of Metairie known as Bucktown. It continued eastward along Metairie-Hammond Highway, commonly referred to as Old Hammond Highway, to the 17th Street Canal Bridge at the Jefferson Parish-Orleans Parish line, also the border between Metairie and New Orleans.

LA 613-1 was an undivided, two-lane highway from Chickasaw Avenue to Carrollton Avenue. It widened into an undivided, four-lane highway for the remainder of its length.

LA 613-1 was a vestige of the never-completed New Orleans-Hammond Lakeshore Highway. The highway existed atop the old Lake Pontchartrain levee and was severed at Chickasaw Street when the current (much higher) levee was constructed in the 1950s. The remainder of the highway to Kenner was left outside the new levee system and was abandoned. (In the 1970s, the old roadbed was converted into the Linear Park bicycle path.) The surviving portion of the highway extends from Chickasaw Avenue in Metairie to the intersection of Pontchartrain and West Robert E. Lee Boulevards in New Orleans, a distance of 0.8 miles.

LA 613-1 once included the Orleans Parish section of the New Orleans-Hammond Highway as well as Lakeshore Drive. At its complete length, LA 613-1 was part of State Routes 33 and C-1337 in the pre-1955 Louisiana highway system.

Parish	Location	mi	km	Destinations	Notes
Jefferson	Metairie	0.00	0.00	Chickasaw Avenue	Western terminus
Jefferson	Metairie	0.34	0.55	Bridge over 17th Street Canal	
Jefferson–Orleans parish line	Metairie–New Orleans line	0.37	0.60	End state maintenance on east side of bridge	Eastern terminus
1.000 mi = 1.609 km; 1.000 km = 0.621 mi

== Louisiana Highway 613-2 ==
Louisiana Highway 613-2
- Location: New Orleans
- Length: 3.7 mi (6.0 km)
- Existed: 1955–c. 1957

From the south, LA 613-2 began at an intersection with South Carrollton Avenue and proceeded north along Pontchartrain Boulevard to N.O. Hammond Highway at West End. Along the way it crossed underneath U.S. 61 (Airline Highway) and intersected LA 611-9 (Metairie Road).

LA 613-2 was a four-lane, divided highway from its southern terminus to LA 611–9, where it narrowed to an undivided, two-lane highway for the remainder of its route.

LA 613-2 was part of State Route 33 in the pre-1955 Louisiana Highway system and, like LA 613-1, was part of the never-completed New Orleans-Hammond Lakeshore Highway. In the 1960s, I-10 (Pontchartrain Expressway) was constructed alongside Pontchartrain Boulevard, leaving it discontinuous in several places and no longer intersecting with South Carrollton Avenue.

The entire highway was in New Orleans, Orleans Parish.

mi	km	Destinations	Notes
0.0	0.0	South Carrollton Avenue	Southern terminus
1.0	1.6	LA 611-9 (Metairie Road)	Eastern terminus of LA 611-9
3.7	6.0	LA 613-1 (N.O. Hammond Highway, Pontchartrain Boulevard)	Northern terminus
1.000 mi = 1.609 km; 1.000 km = 0.621 mi

== Louisiana Highway 613-3 ==
Louisiana Highway 613-3
- Location: New Orleans
- Length: 0.97 mi (1,560 m)
- Existed: 1955–c. 1950s

From the south, LA 613-3 began at an intersection with Dreux Avenue and proceeded north along Franklin Avenue to Southline Drive, now Leon C. Simon Drive.

LA 613-3 was a four-lane, divided highway for its entire length.

LA 613-3 was part of State Route C-1452 in pre-1955 Louisiana Highway system. State Route C-1452 included all of Franklin Avenue between U.S. 90 (Gentilly Boulevard) on the south and Lakeshore Drive on the north.

The entire highway was in New Orleans, Orleans Parish.

mi	km	Destinations	Notes
0.00	0.00	Dreux Avenue	Southern terminus
0.97	1.56	Southline Drive (now Leon C. Simon Drive)	Northern terminus
1.000 mi = 1.609 km; 1.000 km = 0.621 mi

== Louisiana Highway 613-4 ==
Louisiana Highway 613-4
- Location: New Orleans
- Length: 0.19 mi (310 m)
- Existed: 1955–c. 1950s

From the south, LA 613-4 began at an intersection with Old Gentilly Road and proceeded north along Downman Road to U.S. 90 (Chef Menteur Highway).

LA 613-4 was a two-lane, undivided highway for its entire length.

This former route has been altered by the construction of ramps to and from I-10 constructed in the 1960s.

The entire highway was in New Orleans, Orleans Parish.

mi	km	Destinations	Notes
0.00	0.00	Old Gentilly Road	Southern terminus
0.19	0.31	US 90 (Chef Menteur Highway)	Northern terminus
1.000 mi = 1.609 km; 1.000 km = 0.621 mi

== See also ==
- Old Hammond Highway
