= Buenos Aires International Airport =

Buenos Aires International Airport may refer to:

- Aeroparque Jorge Newbery, the main airport hub for domestic flights in Buenos Aires, Argentina
- Ministro Pistarini International Airport, an international airport serving Buenos Aires, Argentina
