= Lola Castegnaro =

Costa Rican composer (1900–1979)

Lola Castegnaro (16 May 1900 – September 1979) was a Costa Rican conductor, composer and music educator.

== Biography ==
She was born in San José, Costa Rica, and studied music with her father, Italian-born composer Alvise Castegnaro. She continued her studies at the Verdi Conservatory in Milan and the Academia Filarmonica in Bologna. After completing her studies, she returned to Costa Rica in 1941 where she arranged for radio broadcasts of her work and conducted opera.

She later moved to Mexico and took a teaching position at the Academia de Canto de Fanny Anitùa.

She died in Mexico City.

== Works ==
Castegnaro was noted for songs. Selected works include:

- Mirka, operetta
- Sueño de amor
- La casita
- Panis angelicus
- Ojos perversos
- Lasciate amare
