= Corredores (canton) =

Canton in Puntarenas province, Costa Rica

- Canton
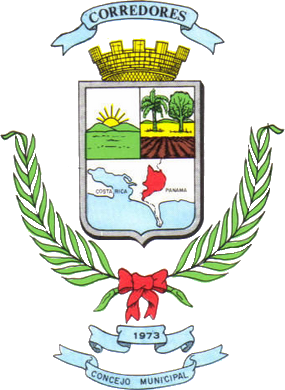
- Flag Seal
- Interactive map of Corredores
- Corredores canton location in Costa Rica
- Coordinates: 8.5380105°N 82.9457347°W
- Country: Costa Rica
- Province: Puntarenas
- Creation: 19 October 1973
- Head city: Ciudad Neily, Corredor
- Districts: Districts: Corredor; La Cuesta; Canoas; Laurel

Government
  - Type: Municipality
  - Body: Municipalidad de Corredores

Area
  - Total: 620.6 km^{2} (239.6 sq mi)
- Elevation: 58 m (190 ft)

Population (2011)
  - Total: 41,831
  - Density: 67.40/km^{2} (174.6/sq mi)
- Time zone: UTC−06:00
- Canton code: 610
- Website: www.municorredores.go.cr

Corredores is a canton in the Puntarenas province of Costa Rica. The head city is Ciudad Neily in Corredor district.

== History ==
Corredores was created on 19 October, 1973 by decree 5373.

In October 2023, CATEM, a migrant detention and processing facility opened in Corredores. In February 2025, it was used to detain migrants renditioned to Costa Rica from the United States.

== Geography ==
Corredores has an area of 620.6 km^{2} and a mean elevation of 58 metres.

The lowland canton shares its eastern border with Panama. The Conte River marks the western limit. The northern boundary runs through the Zapote Ridge, one of the coastal mountain ranges.

== Districts ==
The canton of Corredores is subdivided into the following districts:

1. Corredor
2. La Cuesta
3. Canoas
4. Laurel

== Demographics ==
Historical population
Census	Pop.	±% p.a.
1984	28,366	—
2000	37,274	+1.72%
2011	41,831	+1.05%
2022	51,023	+1.82%
Source: Instituto Nacional de Estadística y Censos; Centro Centroamericano de Población

For the 2011 census, Corredores had a population of 41,831 inhabitants.

== Transportation ==
=== Road transportation ===
The canton is covered by the following road routes:

- National Route 2
- National Route 237
- National Route 238
- National Route 608
- National Route 611
- National Route 614
