= Coto Brus River =

River of Costa Rica

The Coto Brus River is a river of Costa Rica.

== See also ==
- Coto Brus (canton)
