= Interstate 610 =

Interstate 610 may refer to:

- Interstate 610 (Louisiana), an alternate in New Orleans, Louisiana
- Interstate 610 (Texas), a beltway around Houston, Texas
