= Sphaeriodesmidae =

Scientific classification
- Kingdom: Animalia
- Phylum: Arthropoda
- Subphylum: Myriapoda
- Class: Diplopoda
- Order: Polydesmida
- Superfamily: Sphaeriodesmoidea
- Family: Sphaeriodesmidae; Humbert & DeSaussure, 1869

Family of millipedes

Sphaeriodesmidae is a family of flat-backed millipedes in the order Polydesmida. There are about 15 genera and at least 90 described species in Sphaeriodesmidae.

== Genera ==
- Bonetesmus Chamberlin, 1942
- Colobodesmus Brolemann, 1905
- Cyclodesmus Humbert & DeSaussure, 1869
- Cylionus Cook, 1898
- Cyphodesmus Peters, 1864
- Desmonus Cook, 1898
- Eusphaeriodesmus Brolemann, 1916
- Haplocyclodesmus Attems, 1940
- Hybocestus Hoffman, 1959
- Ischnosphaeriodesmus Brolemann, 1916
- Lophocyclus Loomis, 1936
- Proeilodesmus Hoffman, 1990
- Sphaeriodesmus Peters, 1864
- Taphrodesmus Silvestri, 1910
- Tetraporosoma

== Species ==
- Sphaeriodesmus filamentosus, Loomis, 1974
