= Buenos Aires, Costa Rica =

District in Buenos Aires canton, Puntarenas province, Costa Rica

Buenos Aires
- District
- Interactive map of Buenos Aires
- Buenos Aires district location in Costa Rica
- Coordinates: 9.1984622°N 83.2816226°W
- Country: Costa Rica
- Province: Puntarenas
- Canton: Buenos Aires
- Creation: 26 June 1914

Area
  - Total: 555.37 km^{2} (214.43 sq mi)
- Elevation: 361 m (1,184 ft)

Population (2011)
  - Total: 21,063
  - Density: 37.926/km^{2} (98.228/sq mi)
- Time zone: UTC−06:00
- Postal code: 60301

Buenos Aires is a district of the Buenos Aires canton, in the Puntarenas province of Costa Rica.

== History ==
Buenos Aires was created on 26 June 1914 by Ley 31.

The district was originally inhabited by the Boruca natives. The settlement of peoples of Europeans descent began in 1870, when they began building a road from El Guarco to Boruca. Some settlements of different indigenous people of the region are found in the district (Bribri, Boruca and Cabecares).

== Geography ==
Buenos Aires has an area of 555.37 km^{2} and an elevation of 361 metres.

Geographically, the district is situated between the Térraba and El Dique rivers and the Talamanca mountain range. One of the attractions of the place are perfectly formed spherical granite rocks.

== Locations ==
Administrative center of the district is the town of Buenos Aires.

Other villages are Alto Alejo, Alto Brisas, Alto Calderón, Ánimas, Bajo Brisas, Bolas, Brujo, Cabagra (parte), Caracol, Ceibo, Colepato, Florida, Guanacaste, Guadalupe, López, Los Altos, Llano Verde, Machomontes, Palmital, Paso Verbá, Piñera, Platanares, Potrero Cerrado, Puente de Salitre, Río Azul, Salitre, San Carlos, San Miguel Este, San Miguel Oeste, San Vicente, Santa Cruz, Santa Eduvigis, Sipar, Ujarrás and Villahermosa.

== Demographics ==
Historical population
Census	Pop.	±% p.a.
1883	131	—
1927	1,308	+5.37%
1950	2,034	+1.94%
1963	4,624	+6.52%
1973	5,987	+2.62%
1984	8,295	+3.01%
2000	16,843	+4.53%
2011	21,063	+2.05%
2022	22,619	+0.65%
Source: Instituto Nacional de Estadística y Censos; Centro Centroamericano de Población

For the 2011 census, Buenos Aires had a population of 21,063 inhabitants.

== Transportation ==
=== Road transportation ===
The district is covered by the following road routes:

- National Route 2 (Pan-American Highway)
- National Route 246
- National Route 610

=== Airport ===
The city has an airfield, named BAI.

== Economy ==
The economy is dominated by tourism and the cultivation of pineapple. Interesting eco-tourism offers exist, for example, accommodating tourists in the indigenous peoples towns, and taking courses in organic agriculture.

=== Future ===
There are plans to build a dam on the river Térraba to generate electricity. This would create a lake of considerable dimensions. This project has so far not been carried out due to lack of funding, as well as the opposition of certain indigenous groups.
