= San Vito, Costa Rica =

District in Coto Brus canton, Puntarenas province, Costa Rica

San Vito
- District
- San Vito district
- San Vito district location in Costa Rica
- Coordinates: 8.8399853°N 82.9783807°W
- Country: Costa Rica
- Province: Puntarenas
- Canton: Coto Brus
- Creation: 10 December 1965

Area
  - Total: 74.88 km^{2} (28.91 sq mi)
- Elevation: 1,009 m (3,310 ft)

Population (2011)
  - Total: 14,834
  - Density: 198.1/km^{2} (513.1/sq mi)
- Time zone: UTC−06:00
- Postal code: 60801

San Vito (Spanish pronunciation: [sam ˈbito]), originally named San Vito de Java, is a district and head city of the Coto Brus canton, in the Puntarenas province of Costa Rica. It is located about 271 kilometres (168 mi) southeast of the capital San José, and close to the Panama border.

== Toponymy ==
Contrary to popular belief, the name San Vito does not refer to Vito Sansonetti, one of the first landowners in the area, but honors the Italian saint Vitus, founder of villages, who coincidentally had the same name.

The name "Jaba", according to the legend, is due to the fact that at one point the migrants met a Panamanian Indian by the stream as he was passing through San Vito with a "jaba" (a package consisting of a wooden box) on his back. The river is said to have taken the name that it bears to this day.

== History ==
San Vito was founded in 1952, since when it has become an important center in Costa Rica's Brunca region.

San Vito district was created on 10 December 1965 by Ley 3598.

San Vito de Java was the result of a process of foreign agricultural colonization organized by the state of Costa Rica. Its two goals were to populate the country with foreign settlers, and to establish settlements in outlying areas. San Vito was founded by settlers from Europe, in particular Italy.

In 1952, in the midst of the post-war socioeconomic crisis in Europe, the two brothers Vito Giulio Cesar and Ugo Sansonetti organized a group of Italian pioneers from forty different places, from Trieste to Taranto, and including a handful from Istria and Dalmatia.

This Italian immigration is a typical example of directed agricultural colonization, similar in many ways to the process in other places in Latin America. The European immigrants were helped by the Comité Intergubernamental para las Migraciones Europeas (CIME), (Intergovernmental Committee for European Migration).

Vito Sansonetti (1916-1999), a seaman by profession, was the founder of the colonizing company which he named Sociedad Italiana de Colonización Agrícola (SICA), (Italian Agricultural Colonisation Society), and was in charge of negotiations with the Costa Rican authorities represented by the Instituto de Tierras y Colonización (ITCO) (Institute of Land and Colonization). His brother, lawyer Ugo Sansonetti, lived in San Vito and acted as the leader and agent of the company in the region.

Previously, the area had been known simply as Coto Brus, a place name of indigenous origin. At the time, the country was very interested in expanding new agricultural frontiers in order to develop and diversify the economy, as well as to attract foreign investment by means of easy bank loans and land grants.

== Geography ==
San Vito has an area of 74.88 km^{2} and an elevation of 1,009 metres.

The city is located on a high plateau with very irregular topography, at an altitude of 996 metres (3,268 ft) above sea level in the foothills of the Talamanca Mountain Range. The narrow and fast-flowing Java River traverses the outskirts of San Vito from northeast to southeast.

In terms of geomorphology, San Vito is situated in the Valle de Coto Brus (Coto Brus Valley), a depression caused by tectonic activity, and which extends from San Isidro to Panama. The valley is convergent, that is to say the Coto Brus Valley and the Coto Brus River that runs through it meet the Valle del General (Valley of the General), forming the Térraba River plain.

The district is characterized by mountain foothills and irregular high plateaus, and consequently its rivers are straight and fast-flowing.

Climatologically, it is under the influence of the south Pacific climate, meaning that it is characterized by an annual precipitation of 3050 mm, with rain falling on 175 days a year on average. The average temperature is 23 °C, and there is a three-month dry season from December to March. San Vito is affected by moisture coming from the Pacific and entering the area through the Térraba and Coto River valleys.

Vegetation is predominantly low-altitude evergreen wet forest, which is found in wet areas with temperatures between 23 and 38 °C at altitudes from sea level to 1000 metres. Tree species include almond, cedro amargo, gavilán, espavel and kativo, among others.

== Demographics ==
Historical population
Census	Pop.	±% p.a.
1973	7,345	—
1984	12,864	+5.23%
2000	15,531	+1.18%
2011	14,834	−0.42%
2022	12,734	−1.38%
Source: Instituto Nacional de Estadística y Censos; Centro Centroamericano de Población

For the 2011 census, San Vito had a population of 14,834 inhabitants.

There is emigration to more developed areas of Costa Rica or abroad, and a reduced birth rate. On the other hand, many of the inhabitants are temporary, living in the area according to the need to harvest certain crops, coffee in particular.

51% of the population of San Vito are men, and 49% are women. 56% are under fifteen years old and only 5% are over 65 years old, making it a very young city. People of working age make up 39% of the total.

The population of San Vito represents 49% of the total population of the Coto Brus canton.

No other place in Costa Rica has been so strongly influenced by Italian culture, even though with the passing years it has been greatly modified by contributions from other ethnic groups: Creole, Guaymi Native Americans, Asian, and so on.

== Education ==
7% of the population of San Vito have not completed any type of education. 24.8% have completed only primary, while 9% have satisfactorily completed secondary. 6.6% of the population have completed a university education. San Vito is the only place in Costa Rica (other than some small communities) in which the teaching of the Italian language is compulsory in the educational system, and promoted by the Ministerio de Educación Pública (Ministry of Public Education) in order to save Italian customs and traditions.

== Economy ==
Coto Brus overall is one of the zones that rank lowest (Note: HDI for entire Puntarenas province was 0.787 in 2019) in Costa Rica on the Human Development Index. The economy is primarily based on agriculture and cattle farming. The principal crops are coffee, sugarcane, maize/corn, plantains, and beans. Cattle farming has also developed, although on a smaller scale.

Manufacturing is small, linked to farming and to the production of handicrafts for local consumption.

The town is served by San Vito de Java Airport.

=== Sociedad Italiana de Colonización Agrícola ===
The government of Costa Rica offered 10,000 hectares of land, and the contract was signed in 1951. SICA undertook to install 250 families of which 20% would be Costa Rican. The period of 1952 to 1964 was characterised by the settlement and consolidation of the colony. Each family received 20 hectares to use for agriculture.

The colonists had to confront many problems, especially due to the isolation of the region. Nevertheless, from 1964 on, the production of coffee caused the outlook to change for the better. The contract signed in 1951 was a driving force which brought in both the Italian colonists and Costa Ricans from different parts of the country attracted by the economic possibilities that the area offered.

By the 1960s, the colonization effort was bearing fruit. The colonists were making a decent living, the coffee trees had reached a good level of production, and there was other farming, mainly subsistence crops. There was also an urban center where public and social services were available.

In San Vito itself the population went from 45 inhabitants in 1952 to 10,710 in 1982, an annual growth of 710%, while the growth rate for the canton of Coto Brus was 91% over the same period, the number of inhabitants going from 1,000 to 28,000.

SICA began the construction of a series of buildings such as the hospital, the school, the sawmill, industries, and businesses, while the government of Costa Rica undertook to construct a highway between San Vito and Golfito.

Cattle farming was very successful.

=== Tourism ===
Tourism is only just beginning in the area due to a lack of interest on the part of both private business and government. The access roads are in poor condition, and the infrastructure is insufficient to serve the needs of tourism. Nevertheless, the following are noteworthy:

- Dante Alighieri Cultural Center across from the park offers historical information on the Italian immigration. Behind the center is a Jeep that was hit by a bomb in Italy during World War II.
- Wilson Botanical Garden and Las Cruces Biological Station 6 km south of San Vito, protects more than 300 hectares of premontane wet forest at altitudes between 1000 and 1400 metres. It is home to some 2,000 species of plants, more than 400 species of birds, and 113 species of mammals.
- La Amistad International Park is 60 km north of San Vito.
- The Reserva Forestal Las Tablas (Las Tablas Forest Reserve) covers 19,602 hectares, with rugged terrain and a great variety of climates.

== Transportation ==
=== Road transportation ===
The district is covered by the following road routes:

- National Route 237
- National Route 612
- National Route 613
