= Coto Brus (canton) =

Canton in Puntarenas province, Costa Rica

- Canton
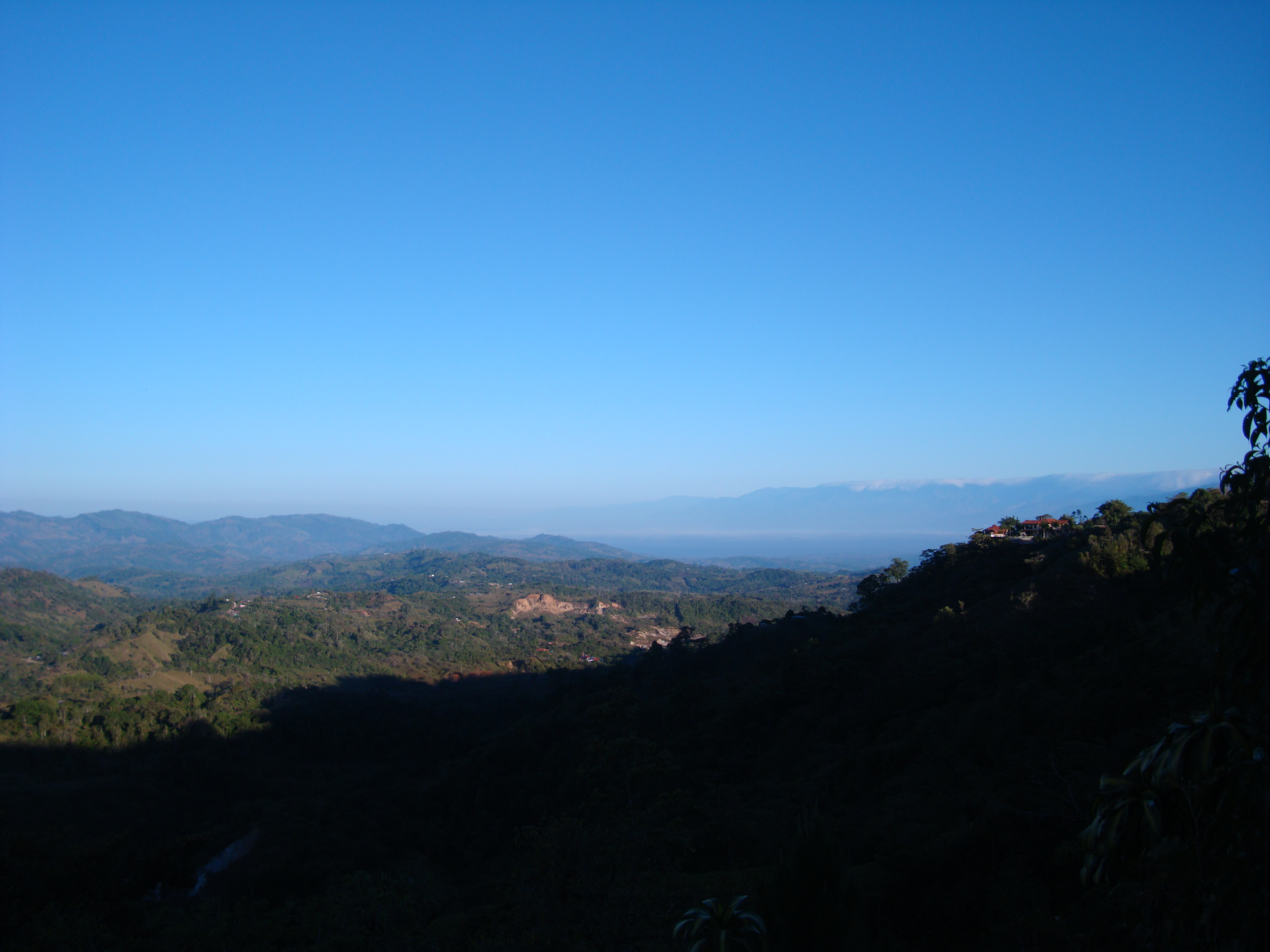
- The surrounding topography of San Vito

- Flag Seal
- Interactive map of Coto Brus
- Coto Brus canton location in Costa Rica
- Coordinates: 8.8889753°N 82.9092434°W
- Country: Costa Rica
- Province: Puntarenas
- Creation: 10 December 1965
- Head city: San Vito
- Districts: Districts: San Vito; Sabalito; Aguabuena; Limoncito; Pittier; Gutiérrez Braun

Government
  - Type: Municipality
  - Body: Municipalidad de Coto Brus

Area
  - Total: 933.91 km^{2} (360.58 sq mi)
- Elevation: 955 m (3,133 ft)

Population (2011)
  - Total: 38,453
  - Density: 41.174/km^{2} (106.64/sq mi)
- Time zone: UTC−06:00
- Canton code: 608
- Website: www.municotobrus.go.cr

Coto Brus is a canton in the Puntarenas province of Costa Rica. The head city is in San Vito district.

== History ==
Coto Brus was created on 10 December, 1965 by decree 3598.

== Geography ==
Coto Brus has an area of 933.91 km^{2} and a mean elevation of 955 metres.

The upland canton shares its eastern border with Panama. The northern limit is high in the Cordillera de Talamanca, and the southwestern boundary runs through the Fila Zapote, one of many small coastal mountain ranges inland from Costa Rica's Pacific coast.

== Districts ==
The canton of Coto Brus is subdivided into the following districts:

1. San Vito
2. Sabalito
3. Aguabuena
4. Limoncito
5. Pittier
6. Gutiérrez Braun

== Demographics ==
Historical population
Census	Pop.	±% p.a.
1973	19,971	—
1984	31,650	+4.27%
2000	40,082	+1.49%
2011	38,453	−0.38%
2022	46,351	+1.71%
Source: Instituto Nacional de Estadística y Censos; Centro Centroamericano de Población

For the 2011 census, Coto Brus had a population of 38,453 inhabitants.

== Transportation ==
=== Road transportation ===
The canton is covered by the following road routes:

- National Route 237
- National Route 246
- National Route 612
- National Route 613
- National Route 617
