= Golfito (canton) =

Canton in Puntarenas province, Costa Rica

- Canton
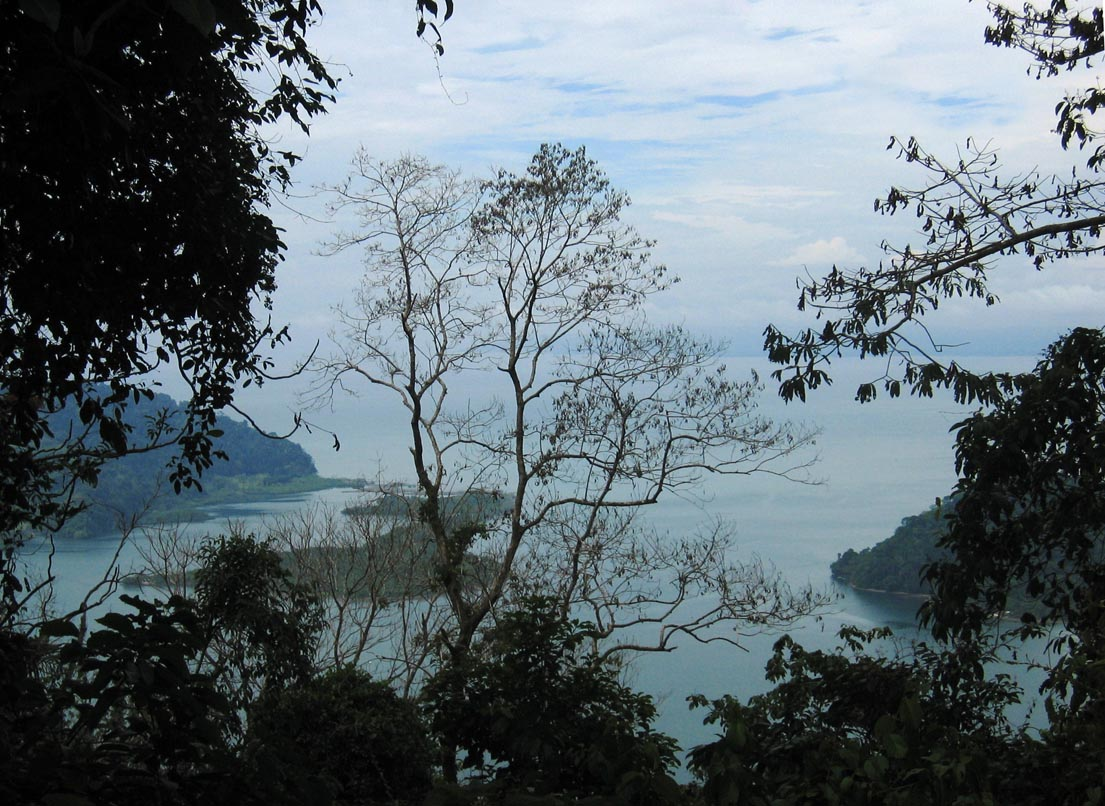
- Golfito Bay

- Flag
- Interactive map of Golfito
- Golfito canton location in Costa Rica
- Coordinates: 8.652603°N 83.1733158°W
- Country: Costa Rica
- Province: Puntarenas
- Creation: 10 June 1949
- Head city: Golfito
- Districts: Districts: Golfito; Guaycará; Pavón

Government
  - Type: Municipality
  - Body: Municipalidad de Golfito

Area
  - Total: 1,753.96 km^{2} (677.21 sq mi)
- Elevation: 24 m (79 ft)

Population (2011)
  - Total: 39,150
  - Density: 22.32/km^{2} (57.81/sq mi)
- Time zone: UTC−06:00
- Canton code: 607

Golfito is a canton in the Puntarenas province of Costa Rica. The head city is in Golfito district.

== History ==
Golfito was created on 10 June, 1949 by decree 532.

== Geography ==
Golfito has an area of 1,753.96 km^{2} (677.21 sq mi) and a mean elevation of 24 metres.

The canton encompasses the southernmost Pacific coast of Costa Rica, north from Punta Gorda Hill at the Panama border, on the east side of the Golfo Dulce.

== Districts ==
The canton of Golfito is subdivided into the following districts:

- Golfito
- Guaycará
- Pavón

Puerto Jiménez was the second district of the canton, which was segregated to become Puerto Jiménez canton on 8 April 2022.

== Demographics ==
Historical population
Census	Pop.	±% p.a.
1950	10,396	—
1963	36,567	+10.16%
1973	42,510	+1.52%
1984	29,043	−3.40%
2000	33,823	+0.96%
2011	39,150	+1.34%
2022	44,086	+1.09%
Source: Instituto Nacional de Estadística y Censos; Centro Centroamericano de Población

At the 2011 census, Golfito had a population of 39,150 inhabitants.

== Transportation ==
=== Road transportation ===
The canton is covered by the following road routes:

- National Route 2
- National Route 14
- National Route 238
- National Route 245
- National Route 611
