= Puntarenas Province =

Province of Costa Rica

Puntarenas
- Province
- Flag Seal

- Coordinates: 9°58′41″N 84°49′50″W
- Country: Costa Rica
- Capital city: Puntarenas (pop. 102,504)
- Largest city: Puntarenas

Area
  - Total: 11,266 km^{2} (4,350 sq mi)

Population
  - Total: 510,566
  - Density: 45.319/km^{2} (117.38/sq mi)
- ISO 3166 code: CR-P
- HDI (2022): 0.783 high · 6th of 7

Puntarenas (Spanish pronunciation: [puntaˈɾenas]) is a province of Costa Rica. It is located in the western part of the country, covering most of Costa Rica's Pacific Ocean coast, and it is the largest province in Costa Rica. Clockwise from the northwest, it borders on the provinces Guanacaste, Alajuela, San José and Limón, and the neighbouring country of Panama.

== Overview ==
The capital is Puntarenas. The province covers an area of 11,266 square kilometres (4,350 sq mi) and has a population of 410,929. It is subdivided into 13 cantons. For administrative purposes, the island Isla del Coco, 500 kilometres (310 mi) offshore in the Pacific Ocean, is considered a part of this province.

Canton (Capital):

1. Buenos Aires (Buenos Aires)
2. Corredores (Ciudad Neily at Corredor district)
3. Coto Brus (San Vito)
4. Esparza (Esparza city at Espíritu Santo district)
5. Garabito (Jacó)
6. Golfito (Golfito)
7. Montes de Oro (Miramar)
8. Osa (Ciudad Cortés)
9. Parrita (Parrita)
10. Puntarenas (Puntarenas)
11. Quepos (Quepos)
12. Monteverde (Monteverde)
13. Puerto Jiménez (Puerto Jiménez)

== Notable places ==
- Jacó
- Manuel Antonio National Park
- Montezuma
- Monteverde
- San Lucas Island
- Coto 47
- Diquís spheres
- Temporary Migrant Care Center (CATEM)

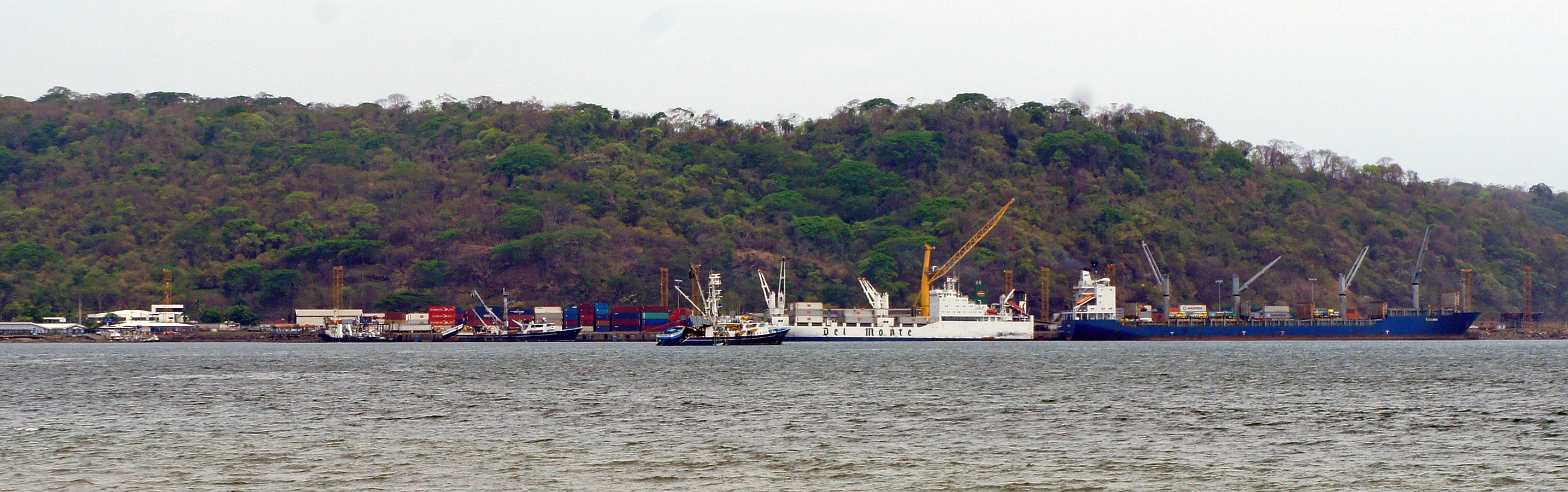
The Port of Caldera, located in the Puntarenas province, is Costa Rica's main port in the Pacific coast.
