= Grecia, Costa Rica =

District in Grecia canton, Alajuela province, Costa Rica

Grecia
- District
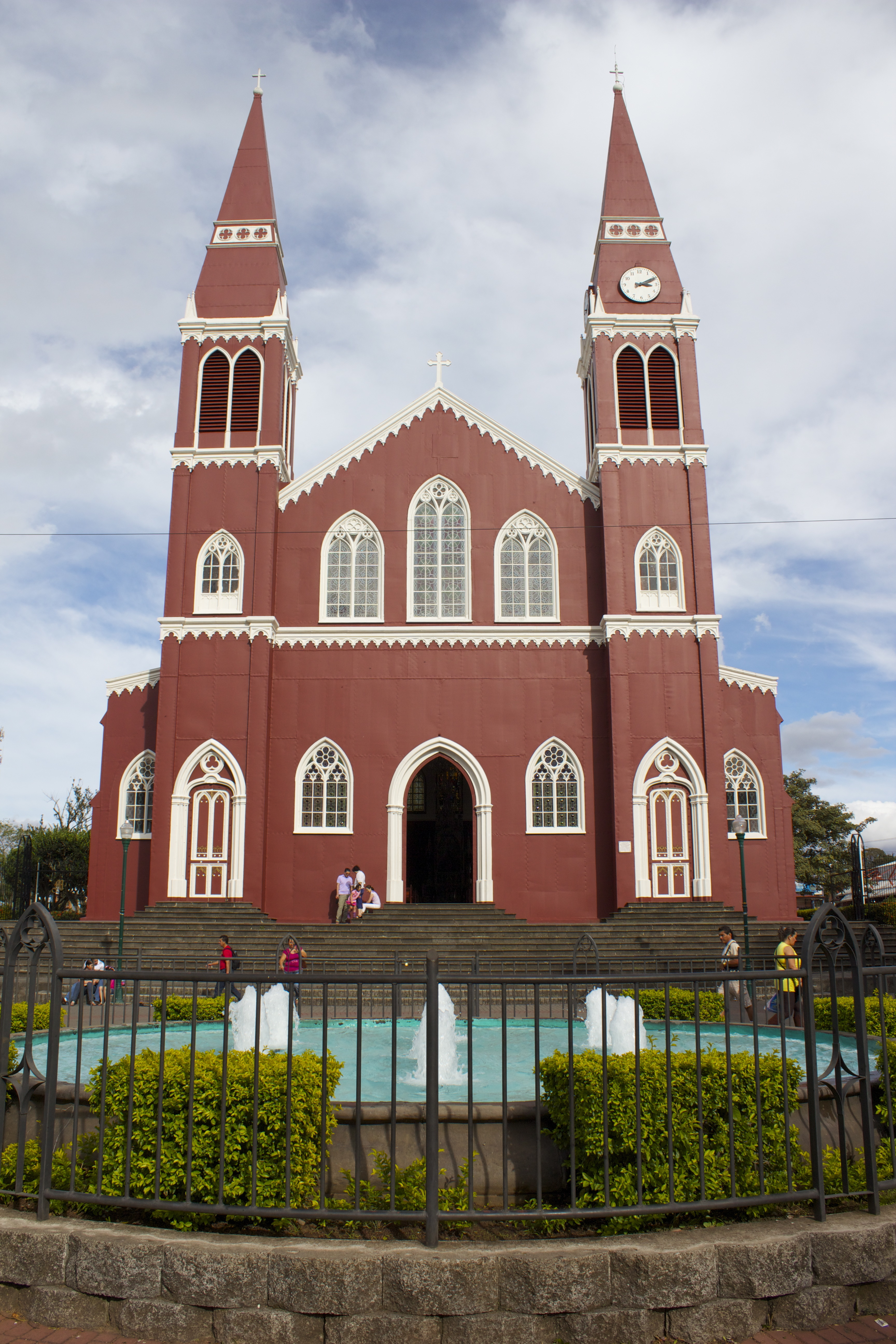
- Church of Our Lady of Mercy in Grecia, Costa Rica
- Nickname: "The cleanest city in Latin America"
- Interactive map of Grecia
- Grecia district location in Costa Rica
- Coordinates: 10.0693118°N 84.3135805°W
- Country: Costa Rica
- Province: Alajuela
- Canton: Grecia

Area
  - Total: 7.51 km^{2} (2.90 sq mi)
- Elevation: 999 m (3,278 ft)

Population (2011)
  - Total: 14,859
  - Density: 1,980/km^{2} (5,120/sq mi)
- Time zone: UTC−06:00
- Postal code: 20301
- Climate: Am

Grecia is a district of the Grecia canton, in the Alajuela province of Costa Rica. Grecia has an area of 7.51 km^{2} (2.90 sq mi) and an elevation of 999 m (3,278 ft). It is in the foothills of the Cordillera Central on the eastern edge of the Central Valley. The city, which was once named "the cleanest city in Latin America,"

== Geography ==
Grecia has an area of 7.51 km^{2} (2.90 sq mi) and an elevation of 999 m (3,278 ft). It is in the foothills of the Cordillera Central on the eastern edge of the Central Valley. The city, which was once named "the cleanest city in Latin America," is 20 km (12 mi) northwest of the provincial capital city of Alajuela, 27 km (17 mi) from Juan Santamaría International Airport, and 45 km (28 mi) from the national capital city of San José.

== History ==
=== Pre-Columbian Era ===
Grecia, and its neighboring districts, was previously inhabited by indigenous peoples belonging to the Western Huetar Kingdom. This presence occurred during the reign of King Garabito.

=== 19th Century ===
Grecia was petitioned to be founded as a town as early as October 1828. The first group of settlers, who later became bosses to future settlers, found the unestablished land to be very fertile. Furthermore, the state government motivated these travelers to discover pathways up North by offering them incentives. These discoveries and rewards led to an increase of migration of settlers into the northwest of the Central Valley, looking for unclaimed land to work on.

Eventually, the increase of settlements and construction of homes in the territory motivated residents to look for permission from the local government to officially establish the town. Their request, named File Number 21, was not approved until ten years later.

Legislation Number 69 was signed and enacted on April 27, 1838. The act allowed travelers to explore past the "other side of the Poas" and construct a settlement they would call Grecia.

== Economy ==
Grecia is part of the tourist route of the western region of the Central Valley of Costa Rica, given the existence in the canton of waterfalls, protected areas, and the Catholic church of Nuestra Señora de las Mercedes, which is part of Costa Rica's historical-architectural heritage.

== Culture ==
=== Iglesia de Nuestra Señora de las Mercedes ===
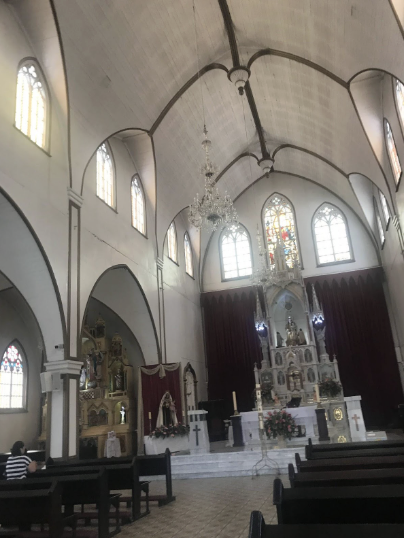
Interior of Church of Our Lady of Mercy, located in Grecia, Costa Rica.

Grecia is noted for its unique church, Iglesia de Nuestra Señora de las Mercedes, made entirely of pre-fabricated steel plates painted red. The building was constructed in the 19th century to represent the practice of Catholic religion in Grecia and honor the Virgin Mary.

Initially approved to be designed as a doric style brick temple, the Church of Our Lady of Mercy is built with neoclassical influence due to Angel Miguel Velasquez, secretary of public works at the time who introduced the design to the district.

There are several urban legends about this church. One recounts how the church was donated by some foreign country, and sent to Greece as a gift, but was wrongly shipped to Grecia, Costa Rica. Another legend states that the final destination of the church was the city of Punta Arenas in Chile but was disembarked, by mistake, in the port of Puntarenas, Costa Rica, and later sent to the city of Grecia, where it was assembled.

However, records clearly show that the instruction, shipment, and construction of the church were a coordinated effort of Grecia's population, the Catholic Church, the Costa Rican government, and Alejo E. Jiménez Bonnefil (1858–1922), a Costa Rican coffee producer and exporter who was in charge of commanding and importing the church from the manufacturer Ateliers de la Société de Couvillet in Belgium, in the late 19th century.

== Parks and recreation ==
=== Grecia Central Park ===
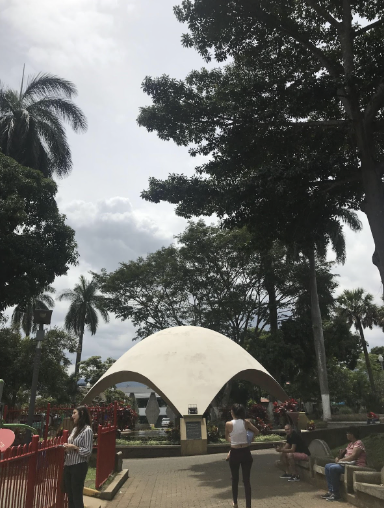
Grecia Central Park in Downtown Grecia

Located in front of Our Lady of Mercy Church, Grecia Central Park is one of the many parks in the district. The park has undergone numerous changes over the past few years, including the remodeling of its entire electrical system. The recreation ground is primarily used for walking. After numerous closures, however, the local government made an effort to promote the use of the space for its residents. The Vamos al Parque program, in collaboration with the University of Costa Rica, developed events such as free art, education, and recreation activities for its residents.

== Flora and fauna ==
A toucan named Grecia is the first toucan to receive a prosthetic beak. Its name is due to where the bird was found injured prior to its admission to the Rescate Wildlife Rescue Center (formerly Rescate Animal Zoo Ave), south of the city.

== Demographics ==
Historical population
Census	Pop.	±% p.a.
1864	795	—
1883	1,339	+2.78%
1892	1,379	+0.33%
1927	2,737	+1.98%
1950	4,123	+1.80%
1963	7,065	+4.23%
1973	9,984	+3.52%
1984	11,374	+1.19%
2000	14,277	+1.43%
2011	14,859	+0.36%
2022	14,244	−0.38%
Source: Instituto Nacional de Estadística y Censos; Centro Centroamericano de Población

In June 2023, the population of Grecia was predicted to be 16,158—an 8% increase over 2011.

In the district, population is predicted to vary by age, with 21.4% at age 19 and under, 6.5% from 20 to 24, 35.7% from 25 to 44, 25.3% from 45 to 64 and 11.1% who were 65 or more.

== Government and politics ==
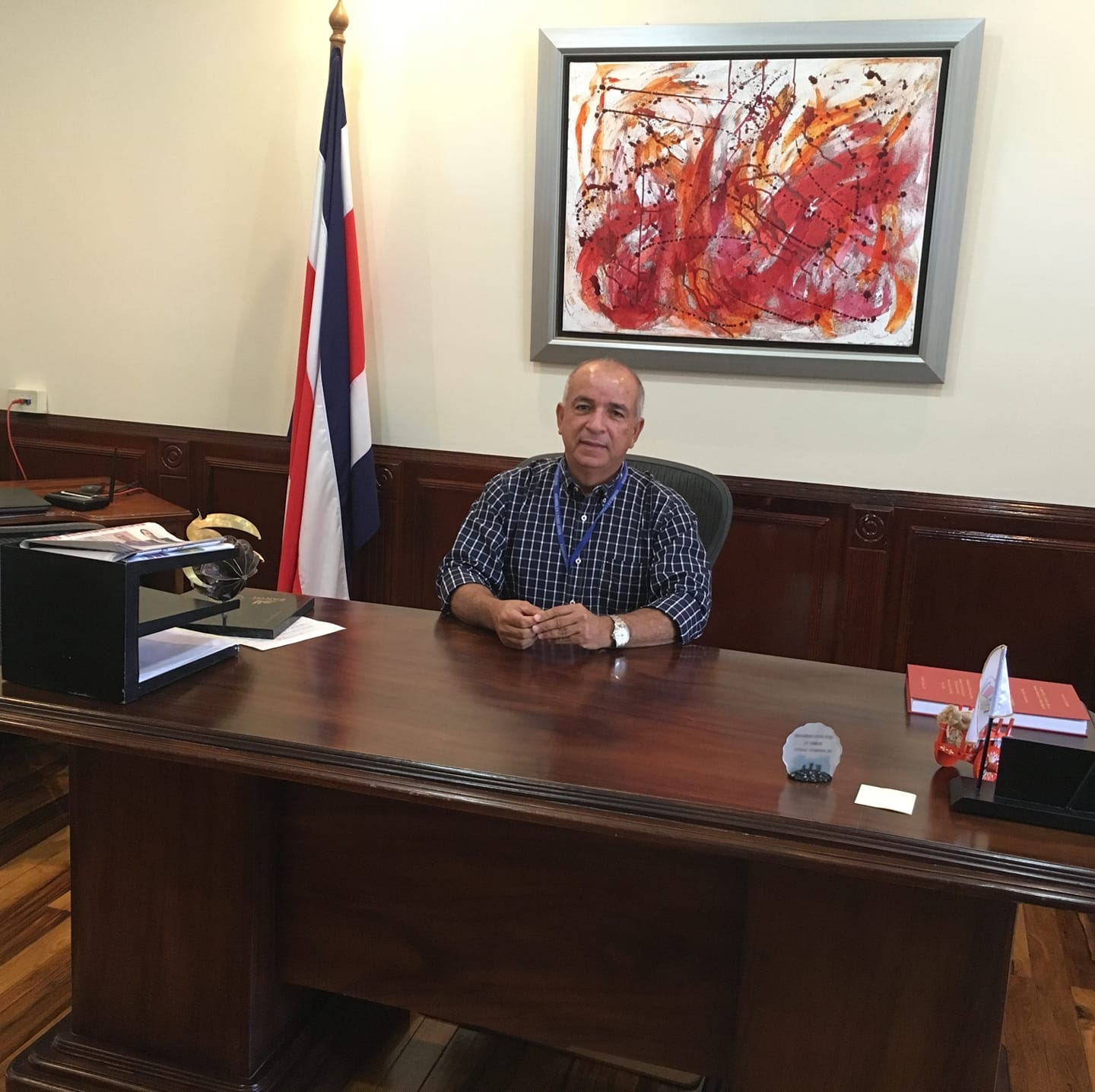
Francisco Murillo Quesada, the Current Mayor of Grecia

The local government of the district of Grecia is that of the Grecia canton—Grecia is a district in the Grecia canton. The municipality serves every district in the canton and its main responsibility is to administer local services and satisfy the interests of its residents. In 2020, Francisco Murillo Quesada, a lawyer, became the mayor of the Grecia canton. This also made him the mayor of the district of Grecia. He succeeded Minor Molina in May 2020. The first and second vice mayors of Grecia are Nora Maria Suarez Cruz and Francisco Rodriguez Gutierrez, respectively.

The district of Grecia is one of the seven districts that belong to the local government of the Grecia canton. The municipality consists of a popularly elected council, a trustee for each district, and a mayor. Currently, the trustee of the Grecia district is Luz María Jiménez Arrieta. She succeeded Roy José Rodríguez Corrales, who resigned in 2023.

== Transportation ==
=== Road transportation ===
The district is covered by the following road routes:

- National Route 107
- National Route 118
- National Route 154
- National Route 711
