= Tacares =

District in Grecia canton, Alajuela province, Costa Rica

- District
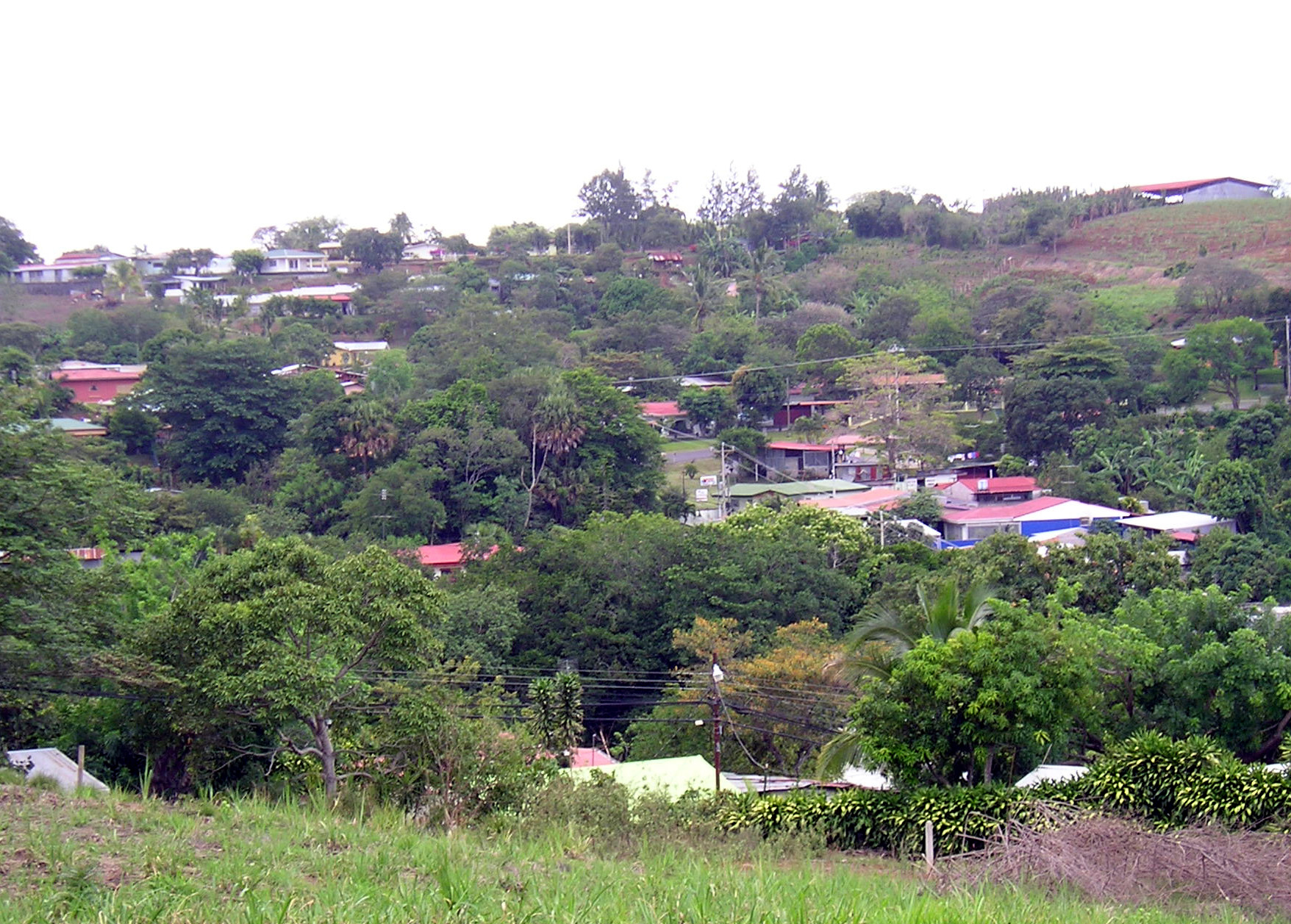
- Village of Tacares, Costa Rica
- Tacares district
- Tacares district location in Costa Rica
- Coordinates: 10.0315178°N 84.3118077°W
- Country: Costa Rica
- Province: Alajuela
- Canton: Grecia

Area
  - Total: 24.82 km^{2} (9.58 sq mi)
- Elevation: 800 m (2,600 ft)

Population (2011)
  - Total: 7,963
  - Density: 320.8/km^{2} (830.9/sq mi)
- Time zone: UTC−06:00
- Postal code: 20305

Tacares is a district of the Grecia canton, in the Alajuela province of Costa Rica.

== Geography ==
Tacares has an area of 24.82 km^{2} and an elevation of 800 metres.

== Demographics ==
Historical population
| Census | Pop. | ±% p.a. |
|---|---|---|
| 1883 | 463 | — |
| 1892 | 504 | +0.95% |
| 1927 | 2,013 | +4.04% |
| 1950 | 1,833 | −0.41% |
| 1963 | 3,152 | +4.26% |
| 1973 | 3,439 | +0.88% |
| 1984 | 3,902 | +1.15% |
| 2000 | 6,879 | +3.61% |
| 2011 | 7,963 | +1.34% |
| 2022 | 10,125 | +2.21% |
Source: Instituto Nacional de Estadística y Censos; Centro Centroamericano de Población

For the 2011 census, Tacares had a population of 7,963 inhabitants.

== Transportation ==
=== Road transportation ===
The district is covered by the following road routes:

- National Route 1
- National Route 118
- National Route 717
- National Route 722
