= 727 =

727 may refer to:

- Boeing 727, an airliner
- AD 727, a year
- 727 BC, a year
- 727 (number), a number
- "727", a song by The Box Tops from the album Cry Like a Baby
- 7/27, a 2016 album by Fifth Harmony
- Area code 727, for telephones in Pinellas County, Florida
- USS Michigan (SSBN-727), a U.S. ballistic missile submarine
- Jet 727, a bus service in Aberdeen, Scotland

== See also ==
- List of highways numbered 727
