= List of highways numbered 725 =

The following highways are numbered 725:

== Canada ==
- Highway 725

== Costa Rica ==
- National Route 725

== United States ==
- LA 725
- MD 725
- SR 725
- PR-725
- FM 725

Preceded by 724	Lists of highways 725	Succeeded by 726
