= Maryland Route 202 =

State highway in Prince George's County, Maryland, United States

Maryland Route 202
- Maryland Route 202 highlighted in red

Route information
- Maintained by MDSHA
- Length: 13.92 mi (22.40 km)
- Existed: 1927–present
- Tourist routes: Star-Spangled Banner Scenic Byway

Major junctions
- South end: MD 725 in Upper Marlboro
- MD 193 near Kettering; MD 214 in Largo; I-95 / I-495 near Landover; MD 704 in Landover; US 50 near Landover; Baltimore–Washington Parkway in Cheverly
- North end: MD 450 in Bladensburg

Location
- Country: United States
- State: Maryland
- Counties: Prince George's

Highway system
- Maryland highway system; Interstate; US; State; Scenic Byways
← MD 201	→ MD 206

Maryland Route 202 (MD 202) is a state highway in the U.S. state of Maryland. The highway runs 13.92 miles (22.40 km) from MD 725 in Upper Marlboro north to MD 450 in Bladensburg. MD 202 connects the central Prince George's County communities of Bladensburg, Cheverly, Landover, and Largo with the county seat of Upper Marlboro. The state highway was constructed from Bladensburg to Largo in the mid- to late 1920s and from Largo to Upper Marlboro in the early 1930s. MD 202 was relocated through Landover in the early 1940s. The highway was expanded to a divided highway with several interchanges from Bladensburg through Landover and Largo from the early 1960s to the mid-1970s. In the 1990s, MD 202's divided highway segment was extended halfway to Upper Marlboro and expanded again through Largo, including the construction of several auxiliary routes to connect the highway with Northwest Stadium.

== Route description ==
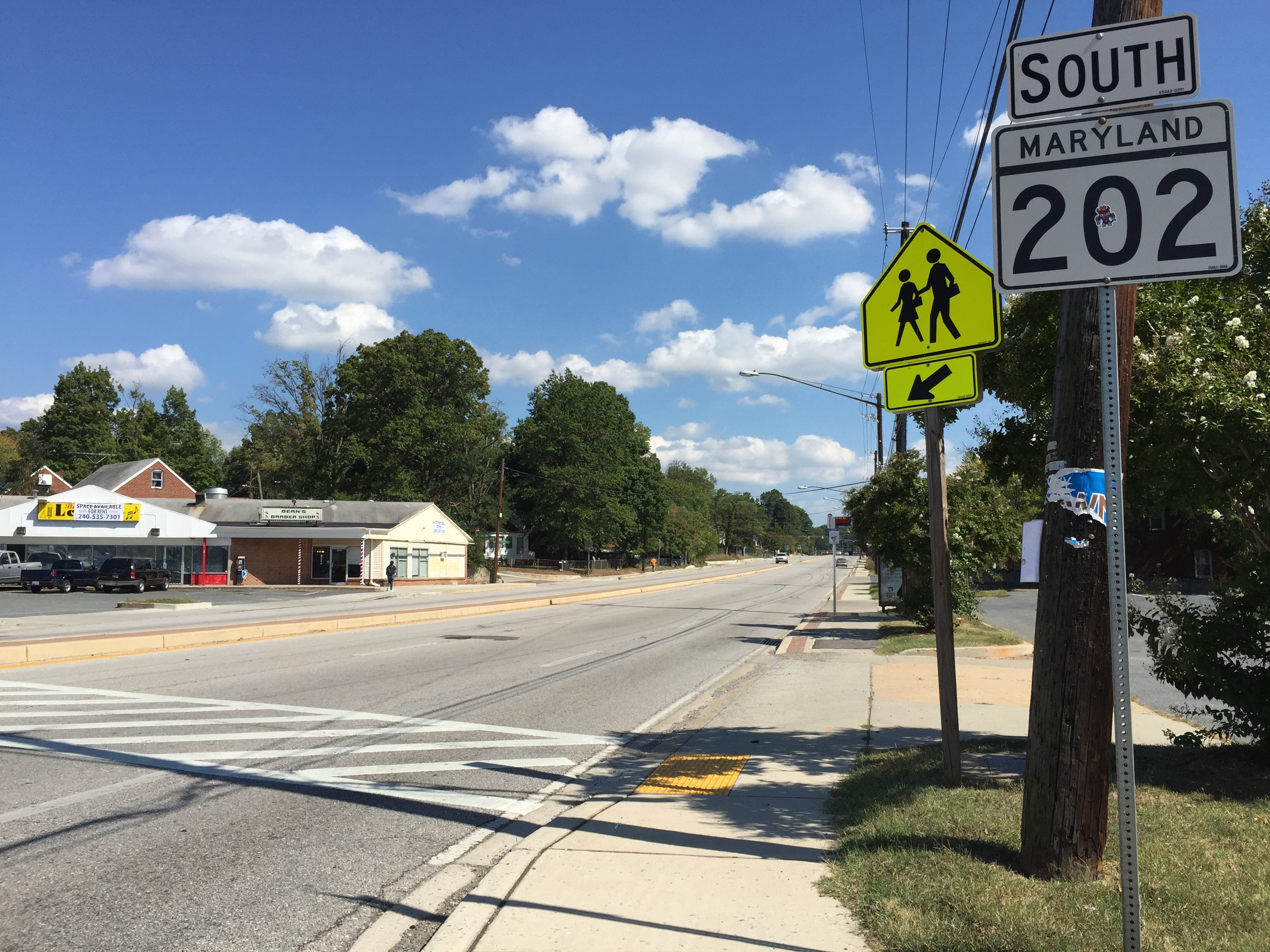
View south at the north end of MD 202 at MD 450 in Bladensburg

MD 202 begins at an intersection with MD 725 (Marlboro Pike) just east of the town of Upper Marlboro. MD 725 provides access to U.S. Route 301 (US 301, Robert Crain Highway) to the east and forms the Main Street of Upper Marlboro to the west. MD 202 heads northwest as Largo Road, which immediately crosses Collington Branch just above its confluence with the Western Branch of the Patuxent River. The undivided highway has three lanes—two lanes northbound and one lane southbound—as it ascends out of the river valley. The road becomes two lanes before it passes through Brock Hall, where the highway parallels several segments of Old Largo Road. MD 202 expands to a four-lane divided highway southeast of its junction with the eastern end of MD 193 (Watkins Park Drive) and crosses the Western Branch into the suburb of Kettering, the site of the historic home Mount Lubentia.

MD 202 passes Largo High School and the main campus of Prince George's Community College just before it expands to six lanes just south of Campus Way in Largo. The highway meets MD 214 (Central Avenue) at a partial cloverleaf interchange. Access from northbound MD 202 to eastbound MD 214 and from westbound MD 214 to southbound MD 202 is via Campus Way. North of MD 214, MD 202 expands to eight lanes and intersects Arena Drive and Lake Arbor Way. The latter road leads through the eponymous suburb; the former road leads to The Boulevard at the Capital Centre, the Downtown Largo station at the eastern terminus of the Washington Metro's Blue and Silver lines, and Northwest Stadium, the home of the Washington Commanders of the National Football League. MD 202 curves west through intersections with Lottsford Road and St. Joseph's Drive and McCormick Drive. At the latter intersection, the highway's name changes to Landover Road.

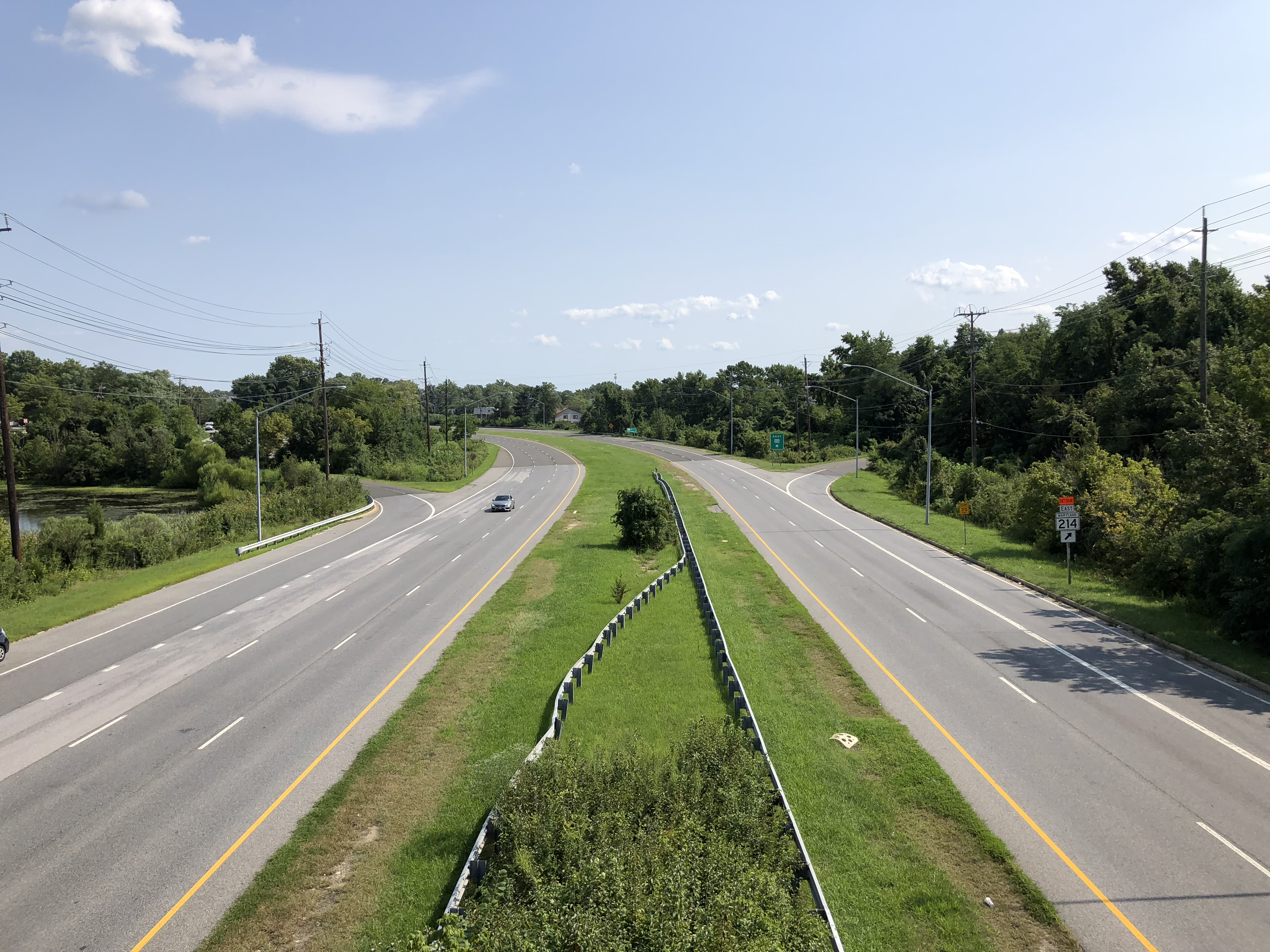
MD 202 southbound viewed from MD 214 in Largo

MD 202 reduces to six lanes just east of its partial cloverleaf interchange with Interstate 95 (I-95)/I-495 (Capital Beltway). The highway passes south of the remains of Landover Mall and intersects Brightseat Road, which is unsigned MD 202E and provides northern access to FedExField. MD 202 continues northwest through Landover and has a cloverleaf interchange with MD 704 (Martin Luther King Jr. Highway). The highway meets the eastern end of Old Landover Road, which leads to the Landover station on the Washington Metro's Orange Line, before crossing over the Orange Line and Amtrak's Northeast Corridor. Immediately to the west of the railroad crossing is MD 202's junction with US 50 (John Hanson Highway), which is a combination of the partial cloverleaf and trumpet interchanges. The highway continues along the northern edge of the town of Cheverly and has a four-ramp partial cloverleaf interchange with the Baltimore–Washington Parkway, which is unsigned MD 295. West of the parkway, MD 202 enters the town of Bladensburg and reaches its northern terminus at MD 450 (Annapolis Road). There is no direct access from westbound MD 450 to southbound MD 202.

MD 202 is a part of the National Highway System for its entire length. The highway is an intermodal connector between US 50 and Old Landover Road. The remainder of MD 202 is a National Highway System principal arterial.

== History ==
The first section of MD 202 was constructed as a concrete road from US 50 (now MD 450) in Bladensburg east to the Pennsylvania Railroad (now Amtrak Northeast Corridor) at Landover in 1924 and 1925. The highway was extended southeast to MD 214 in Largo in 1929 and 1930. The portion of MD 202 from Largo southeast to MD 3 and MD 4 (now MD 725) in Upper Marlboro was constructed as a gravel road that was started in 1930 and completed by 1933. By 1934, traffic on the highway was dense enough that the Maryland State Roads Commission recommended the stretch from Bladensburg to Largo be widened from 15 to 16 feet (4.6 to 4.9 m) to 20 feet (6.1 m).

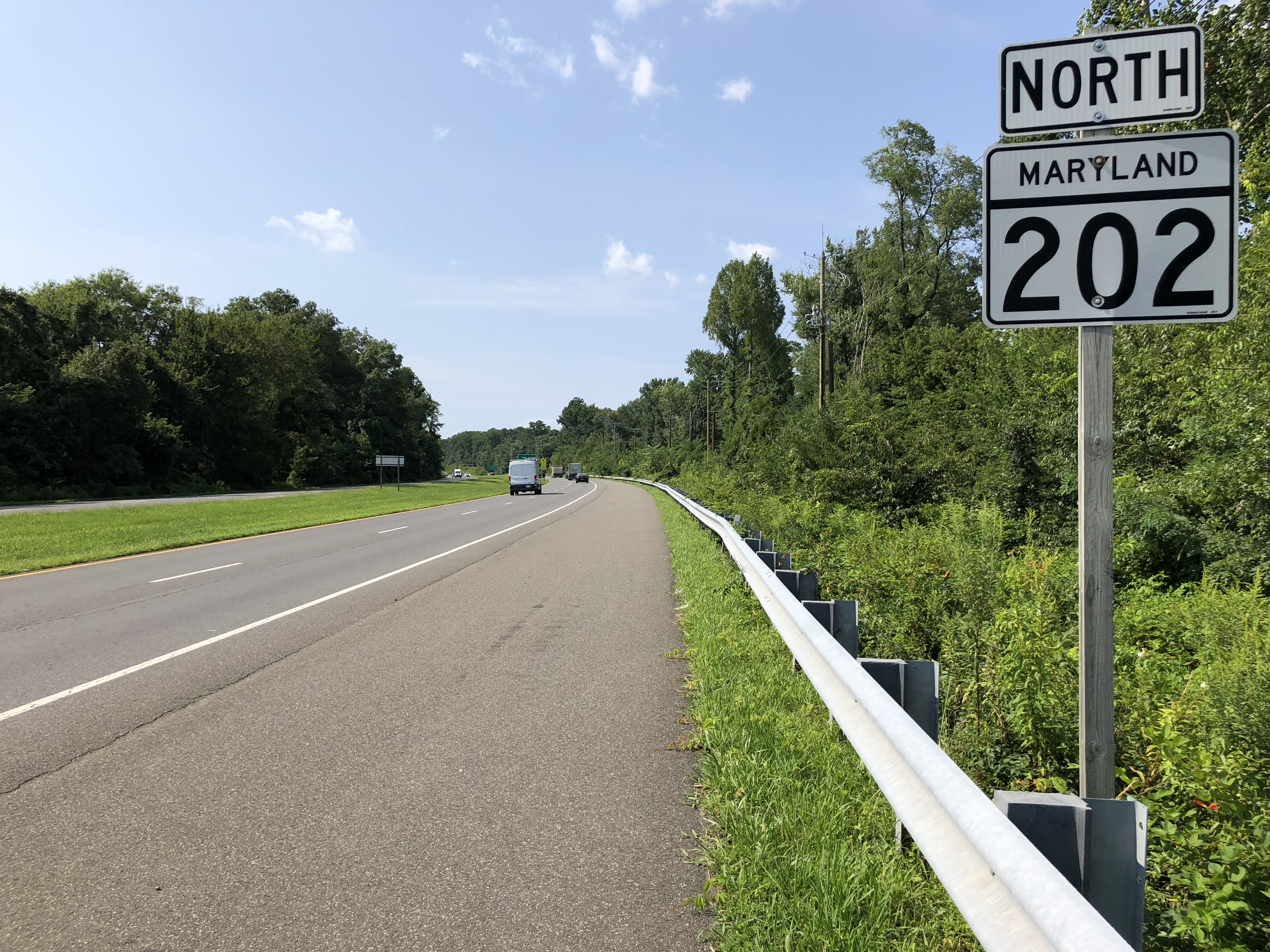
MD 202 northbound in Kettering

The first upgrade to MD 202 was a relocation of the highway at the Pennsylvania Railroad in Landover that was completed in 1942. This relocation bypassed what is now Old Landover Road and included a bridge across the railroad that now carries the southbound lanes of the highway. The relocated highway had a pair of 11-foot-wide (3.4 m) lanes separated by a 4-foot-wide (1.2 m) blacktop median. In 1944, the War Production Board authorized the replacement of MD 202's timber bridge across the right-of-way of the abandoned Washington, Baltimore and Annapolis Electric Railway—which was transformed into MD 704—as one of the few non–war-effort highway projects federally funded during World War II. Construction on the new steel-and-concrete bridge began in late 1944 and was completed by 1946. Access between the grade separated highways at the MD 202–MD 704 junction was via a pair of two-way ramps.

MD 202 was widened and resurfaced from US 50 in Bladensburg to the west end of the Landover relocation in 1949. Expansion of the state route to a divided highway began at the US 50 interchange in Landover in 1958. The US 50 interchange and expansion of MD 202 to a divided highway from Bladensburg to US 50 was completed in 1962. The highway was expanded to a divided highway for a short distance on either side of its interchange with the Capital Beltway by 1966. MD 202 was widened to a divided highway from US 50 to MD 704 in 1967. The gap in the divided highway between MD 704 and west of the Beltway was filled in 1971, the same year the modern cloverleaf interchange was built at the MD 202–MD 704 junction. In addition, MD 202 was expanded to a divided highway from east of the Beltway to just south of MD 214 that year. MD 202 was reconstructed as a divided highway from Largo southeast to Kettering in 1974. The divided highway was extended to the Western Branch east of White House Road in 1993 and to its present extent south of MD 193 in 1999. The MD 202–MD 214 interchange was completed in 1993.

== Junction list ==
The entire route is in Prince George's County.

Location	mi	km	Destinations	Notes
Upper Marlboro	0.00	0.00	MD 725 (Marlboro Pike) to US 301 – Washington, Upper Marlboro	Southern terminus
Kettering	4.35	7.00	MD 193 west (Watkins Park Drive) – Woodmore	Eastern terminus of MD 193
Largo	7.65	12.31	MD 214 (Central Avenue) to I-95 – Annapolis, Washington	Partial cloverleaf interchange; no access from northbound MD 202 to eastbound MD 214 or from westbound MD 214 to southbound MD 202
Landover	9.55	15.37	I-95 / I-495 (Capital Beltway) – College Park, Baltimore, Andrews AFB, Richmond	I-95/I-495 Exit 17
Landover	10.97	17.65	MD 704 (Martin Luther King Jr. Highway) – Glenarden, Seat Pleasant	Cloverleaf interchange
Landover	12.31	19.81	US 50 (John Hanson Highway) – Annapolis, Washington	US 50 Exit 3
Cheverly	13.42	21.60	Baltimore–Washington Parkway (MD 295) – Baltimore, BWI Marshall Airport, Washington	Interchange
Bladensburg	13.92	22.40	MD 450 (Annapolis Road) – Hyattsville, New Carrollton	Northern terminus; no direct access from westbound MD 450 to southbound MD 202
1.000 mi = 1.609 km; 1.000 km = 0.621 mi: Incomplete access

== Auxiliary routes ==
- MD 202B is the designation for the unnamed 0.16-mile (0.26 km) two-lane divided connection between MD 202 and the southbound ramps of the Baltimore–Washington Parkway in Cheverly. The south leg of the four-way intersection formed by MD 202B and the parkway ramps is Mercy Lane, which leads to Prince George's Hospital Center.
- MD 202C is the designation for the 0.30-mile (0.48 km) section of Harry S. Truman Drive on either side of its overpass of MD 214. The highway begins as a four-lane divided highway just south of Capital Lane. MD 202C reduces to an undivided highway with one lane southbound and three lanes northbound at its intersection with a ramp from eastbound MD 214. North of the bridge across MD 214, the route intersects Largo Center Drive; that road heads east as a two-way, five-lane road that leads to a ramp to westbound MD 214. West of the intersection, Largo Center Drive is one-way eastbound. MD 202C ends just north of the intersection as Harry S. Truman Drive continues as a three-lane, one-way complement to Largo Center Drive toward The Boulevard at the Capital Centre and the Largo Town Center Metro station. MD 202C and its interchange ramps with MD 214 were constructed in 1993 concurrent with the MD 202–MD 214 interchange to the east.
- MD 202D is the designation for the 0.11-mile (0.18 km) section of Sheriff Road west from its intersection with Brightseat Road and Sean Taylor Road north of FedExField. This part of Sheriff Road is a four-lane undivided highway. The state highway was designated by 1999 shortly after that part of Sheriff Road was reconstructed as part of the construction of what was then named Jack Kent Cooke Stadium, which opened in 1997.
- MD 202E is the designation for the 0.29-mile (0.47 km) segment of Brightseat Road south from its intersection with MD 202 north of FedEx Field. The highway begins heading west then turns north onto a seven-lane road at its intersection with Sheriff Road and Redskins Road. MD 202E was designated by 1999 shortly after that part of Brightseat Road was reconstructed as part of the stadium construction.
- MD 202F is the designation for the 0.27-mile (0.43 km) portion of Arena Drive from Brightseat Road east to the eastern edge of the route's diamond interchange with the Capital Beltway east of FedExField. Arena Drive is a four to six-lane undivided road. The road continues west as Bishop Peebles Drive toward the stadium and east as county-maintained Arena Drive toward The Boulevard at the Capital Centre and MD 202 in Largo. MD 202E was designated by 1999 shortly after Arena Drive was extended west toward the stadium in 1997.
