= Grecia (canton) =

Canton in Alajuela province, Costa Rica

- Canton
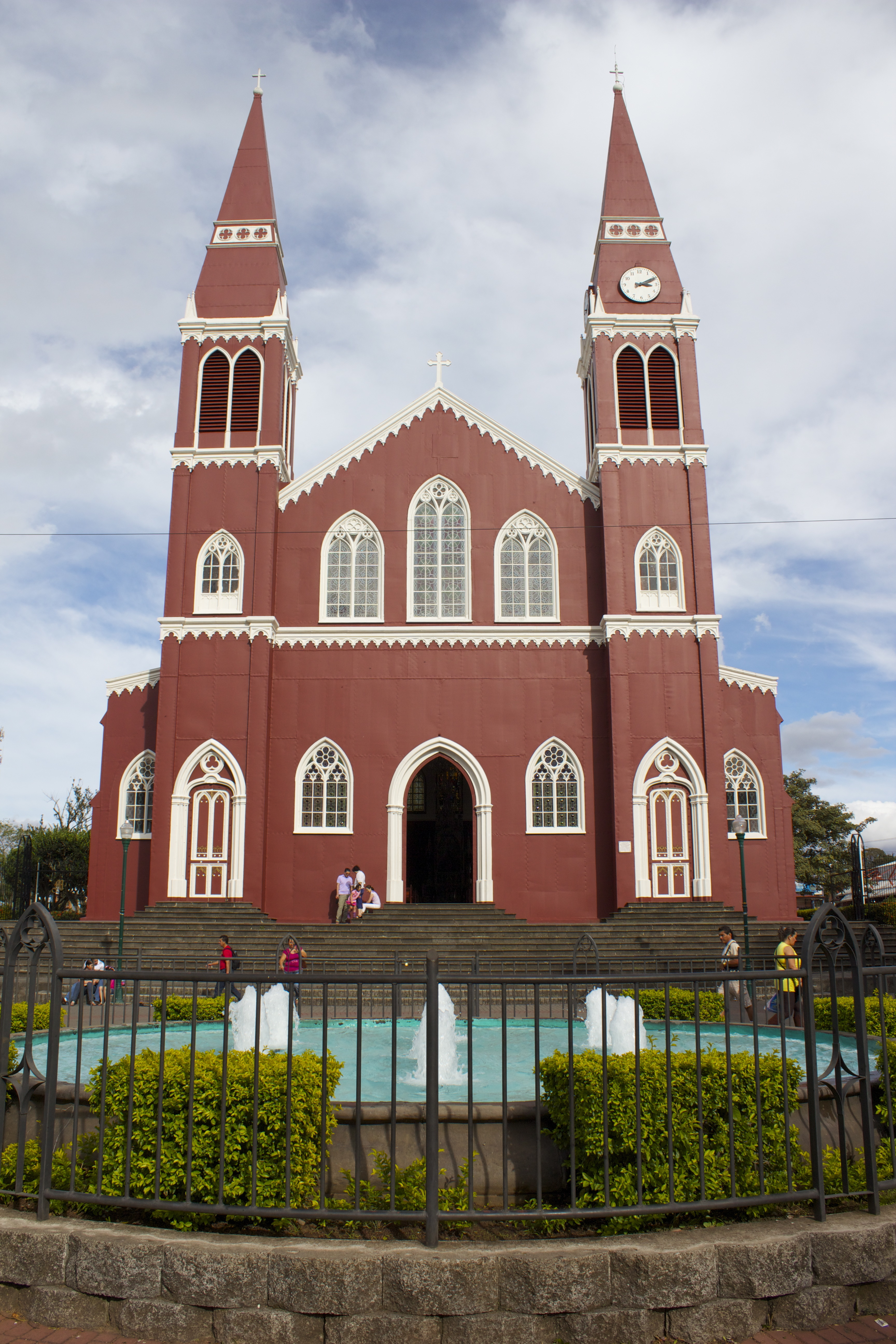
- Our Lady of Mercy Church, in Grecia district of Grecia canton.

- Flag Seal
- Interactive map of Grecia
- Grecia canton location in Alajuela Province Grecia canton location in Costa Rica
- Coordinates: 10.0927177°N 84.2961924°W
- Country: Costa Rica
- Province: Alajuela
- Creation: 27 July 1867
- Head city: Grecia
- Districts: Districts: Grecia; San Isidro; San José; San Roque; Tacares; Puente de Piedra; Bolívar

Government
  - Type: Municipality
  - Body: Municipalidad de Grecia

Area
  - Total: 141.52 km^{2} (54.64 sq mi)
- Elevation: 1,025 m (3,363 ft)

Population (2011)
  - Total: 76,898
  - Density: 543.37/km^{2} (1,407.3/sq mi)
- Time zone: UTC−06:00
- Canton code: 203
- Website: www.grecia.go.cr

Grecia is a canton in the Alajuela province of Costa Rica.

== Toponymy ==
It is named after the country of Greece.

== History ==
Grecia was created on 27 July 1867 by decree 20.

The church of Our Lady of Mercies (Spanish: Iglesia de la Nuestra Señora de las Mercedes) in Grecia was constructed during the late 19th century from plates of imported Belgian steel which have been riveted together.

== Geography ==
Grecia has an area of 141.52 km^{2} (54.64 sq mi) and a mean elevation of 1,025 metres.

The canton lies among ridges and valleys on the southwestern slope of Poas Volcano. One area was completely separated from the remainder of the canton by the Cordillera Central (Central Mountain Range). Known as Río Cuarto, this area lies on the Caribbean Plain. It was a district of Grecia, but became a canton in 2018.

The Poás River and the Prendes River establish a large portion of the eastern border of the elongated canton, with the Sarchí River serving the same purpose on its western edge. The Grande River is the southern border.

== Districts ==
The canton of Grecia is subdivided into the following districts:

1. Grecia
2. San Isidro
3. San José
4. San Roque
5. Tacares
6. Puente de Piedra
7. Bolívar

== Demographics ==
Historical population
Census	Pop.	±% p.a.
1864	5,738	—
1883	7,178	+1.19%
1892	8,797	+2.29%
1927	16,130	+1.75%
1950	23,571	+1.66%
1963	43,923	+4.90%
1973	31,806	−3.18%
1984	38,361	+1.72%
2000	65,119	+3.36%
2011	76,898	+1.52%
2022	76,226	−0.08%
Source: Instituto Nacional de Estadística y Censos; Centro Centroamericano de Población

For the 2011 census, Grecia had a population of 76,898 inhabitants.

== Transportation ==
=== Road transportation ===
The canton is covered by the following road routes:

- National Route 1
- National Route 107
- National Route 118
- National Route 120
- National Route 154
- National Route 711
- National Route 716
- National Route 717
- National Route 722

== See also ==
- Grecia (toucan)
