= San José District, Grecia =

District in Grecia canton, Alajuela province, Costa Rica

San José
- District
- San José district
- San José district location in Costa Rica
- Coordinates: 10.102521°N 84.2689163°W
- Country: Costa Rica
- Province: Alajuela
- Canton: Grecia

Area
  - Total: 12.36 km^{2} (4.77 sq mi)
- Elevation: 1,074 m (3,524 ft)

Population (2011)
  - Total: 8,100
  - Density: 660/km^{2} (1,700/sq mi)
- Time zone: UTC−06:00
- Postal code: 20303

San José is a district of the Grecia canton, in the Alajuela province of Costa Rica.

== Geography ==
San José has an area of 12.36 km^{2} and an elevation of 1,074 metres.

== Demographics ==
Historical population
Census	Pop.	±% p.a.
1892	759	—
1927	1,033	+0.88%
1950	1,332	+1.11%
1963	2,174	+3.84%
1973	2,674	+2.09%
1984	3,344	+2.05%
2000	6,206	+3.94%
2011	8,100	+2.45%
2022	8,333	+0.26%
Source: Instituto Nacional de Estadística y Censos; Centro Centroamericano de Población

For the 2011 census, San José had a population of 8,100 inhabitants.

== Transportation ==
=== Road transportation ===
The district is covered by the following road routes:

- National Route 107
- National Route 722
