= List of highways numbered 723 =

The following highways are numbered 723:

== Costa Rica ==
- National Route 723

== United States ==
Florida

- Florida State Road 723 (former)

Virginia

- Virginia State Route 723

Territories

- Puerto Rico Highway 723

Preceded by 722	Lists of highways 723	Succeeded by 724
