= List of highways numbered 722 =

The following highways are numbered 722:

== Costa Rica ==
- National Route 722

== United States ==
US

- Ohio State Route 722
- Pennsylvania Route 722

Territories

- Puerto Rico Highway 722

Preceded by 721	Lists of highways 722	Succeeded by 723
