= San Juan District, Poás =

District in Poás canton, Alajuela province, Costa Rica

San Juan
- District
- San Juan district
- San Juan district location in Costa Rica
- Coordinates: 10.1353043°N 84.2392991°W
- Country: Costa Rica
- Province: Alajuela
- Canton: Poás

Area
  - Total: 16.31 km^{2} (6.30 sq mi)
- Elevation: 1,270 m (4,170 ft)

Population (2011)
  - Total: 4,638
  - Density: 284.4/km^{2} (736.5/sq mi)
- Time zone: UTC−06:00
- Postal code: 20802

San Juan is a district of the Poás canton, in the Alajuela province of Costa Rica.

== Geography ==
San Juan has an area of 16.31 km^{2} and an elevation of 1,270 metres.

== Demographics ==
Historical population
Census	Pop.	±% p.a.
1927	482	—
1950	657	+1.36%
1963	956	+2.93%
1973	1,143	+1.80%
1984	1,566	+2.90%
2000	3,738	+5.59%
2011	4,638	+1.98%
2022	5,113	+0.89%
Source: Instituto Nacional de Estadística y Censos; Centro Centroamericano de Población

For the 2011 census, San Juan had a population of 4,638 inhabitants.

== Transportation ==
=== Road transportation ===
The district is covered by the following road routes:

- National Route 107
- National Route 120
- National Route 146
