= Carrillos =

District in Poás canton, Alajuela province, Costa Rica

- District
- Interactive map of Carrillos
- Carrillos district location in Costa Rica
- Coordinates: 10.0368568°N 84.2740254°W
- Country: Costa Rica
- Province: Alajuela
- Canton: Poás

Area
  - Total: 10.14 km^{2} (3.92 sq mi)
- Elevation: 812 m (2,664 ft)

Population (2011)
  - Total: 9,228
  - Density: 910.1/km^{2} (2,357/sq mi)
- Time zone: UTC−06:00
- Postal code: 20804

Carrillos is a district of the Poás canton, in the Alajuela province of Costa Rica.

== Geography ==
Carrillos has an area of 10.14 km^{2} and an elevation of 812 metres.

== Demographics ==
Historical population
Census	Pop.	±% p.a.
1927	478	—
1950	829	+2.42%
1963	1,411	+4.18%
1973	2,170	+4.40%
1984	3,844	+5.34%
2000	6,901	+3.72%
2011	9,228	+2.68%
2022	10,399	+1.09%
Source: Instituto Nacional de Estadística y Censos; Centro Centroamericano de Población

For the 2011 census, Carrillos had a population of 9,228 inhabitants.

== Transportation ==
=== Road transportation ===
The district is covered by the following road routes:

- National Route 118
- National Route 723
