= Puente de Piedra District =

District in Grecia canton, Alajuela province, Costa Rica

Puente de Piedra
- District
- Puente de Piedra district
- Puente de Piedra district location in Costa Rica
- Coordinates: 10.0298114°N 84.3331944°W
- Country: Costa Rica
- Province: Alajuela
- Canton: Grecia
- Creation: 22 April 1932

Area
  - Total: 23.07 km^{2} (8.91 sq mi)
- Elevation: 875 m (2,871 ft)

Population (2011)
  - Total: 10,556
  - Density: 457.6/km^{2} (1,185/sq mi)
- Time zone: UTC−06:00
- Postal code: 20307

Puente de Piedra is a district of the Grecia canton, in the Alajuela province of Costa Rica.

== History ==
Puente de Piedra was created on 22 April 1932 by Acuerdo 609 .

== Geography ==
Puente de Piedra has an area of 23.07 km^{2} and an elevation of 875 metres.

== Demographics ==
Historical population
Census	Pop.	±% p.a.
1883	593	—
1892	627	+0.62%
1950	1,666	+1.70%
1963	2,260	+2.37%
1973	2,704	+1.81%
1984	4,493	+4.72%
2000	9,325	+4.67%
2011	10,556	+1.13%
2022	13,810	+2.47%
Source: Instituto Nacional de Estadística y Censos; Centro Centroamericano de Población

For the 2011 census, Puente de Piedra had a population of 10,556 inhabitants.

== Transportation ==
=== Road transportation ===
The district is covered by the following road routes:

- National Route 1
- National Route 118
- National Route 154
- National Route 716
- National Route 717
