= San Rafael District, Poás =

District in Poás canton, Alajuela province, Costa Rica

San Rafael
- District
- San Rafael district
- San Rafael district location in Costa Rica
- Coordinates: 10.0978421°N 84.2566789°W
- Country: Costa Rica
- Province: Alajuela
- Canton: Poás

Area
  - Total: 14.19 km^{2} (5.48 sq mi)
- Elevation: 1,250 m (4,100 ft)

Population (2011)
  - Total: 5,436
  - Density: 383.1/km^{2} (992.2/sq mi)
- Time zone: UTC−06:00
- Postal code: 20803

San Rafael is a district of the Poás canton, in the Alajuela province of Costa Rica.

== Geography ==
San Rafael has an area of 14.19 km^{2} and an elevation of 1,250 metres.

== Demographics ==
Historical population
Census	Pop.	±% p.a.
1927	1,010	—
1950	1,223	+0.84%
1963	2,026	+3.96%
1973	2,301	+1.28%
1984	2,586	+1.07%
2000	5,025	+4.24%
2011	5,436	+0.72%
2022	7,421	+2.87%
Source: Instituto Nacional de Estadística y Censos; Centro Centroamericano de Población

For the 2011 census, San Rafael had a population of 5,436 inhabitants.

== Transportation ==
=== Road transportation ===
The district is covered by the following road routes:

- National Route 107
