= List of highways numbered 724 =

The following highways are numbered 724:

== Canada ==
- Highway 724

== United States ==
- SR 724 (former)
- LA 724
- PA 724
- PR-724
- FM 724

Preceded by 723	Lists of highways 724	Succeeded by 725
