= National Route 154 (Costa Rica) =

National Road Route in Costa Rica

National Secondary Route 154
- Ruta nacional secundaria 154

Route information
- Maintained by Ministry of Public Works and Transport
- Length: 9.170 km (5.698 mi)

Location
- Country: Costa Rica
- Provinces: Alajuela

Highway system
- National Road Network of Costa Rica
← Route 153	→ Route 155

National Secondary Route 154, or just Route 154 (Spanish: Ruta Nacional Secundaria 154, or Ruta 154) is a National Road Route of Costa Rica located in the Alajuela province.

== Description ==
In Alajuela province the route covers Grecia canton (Grecia and Puente de Piedra districts).
