= National Route 716 (Costa Rica) =

National Road Route in Costa Rica

National Tertiary Route 716
- Ruta nacional terciaria 716

Route information
- Maintained by Ministry of Public Works and Transport
- Length: 6.075 km (3.775 mi)

Location
- Country: Costa Rica
- Provinces: Alajuela

Highway system
- National Road Network of Costa Rica
← Route 715	→ Route 717

National Tertiary Route 716, or just Route 716 (Spanish: Ruta Nacional Terciaria 716, or Ruta 716) is a National Road Route of Costa Rica located in the Alajuela province.

== Description ==
In Alajuela province the route covers Grecia canton (Puente de Piedra district) and Atenas canton (Santa Eulalia district).
