= Maryland Route 704 =

Highway in Maryland, United States

Maryland Route 704
- Martin Luther King Jr. Highway
- Maryland Route 704 highlighted in red

Route information
- Maintained by MDSHA
- Length: 6.53 mi (10.51 km)
- Existed: 1944–present

Major junctions
- West end: 63rd Street at the District of Columbia boundary in Seat Pleasant
- MD 202 in Landover; US 50 / I-95 / I-495 in Lanham
- East end: MD 450 in Lanham

Location
- Country: United States
- State: Maryland
- Counties: Prince George's

Highway system
- Maryland highway system; Interstate; US; State; Scenic Byways
← MD 703	→ MD 707

Maryland Route 704 (MD 704) is a state highway in the U.S. state of Maryland. Known as Martin Luther King Jr. Highway, the highway runs 6.53 miles (10.51 km) from Eastern Avenue at the District of Columbia boundary in Seat Pleasant east to MD 450 in Lanham. MD 704 is a four- to six-lane divided highway that connects the northern Prince George's County communities of Seat Pleasant, Landover, Glenarden, and Lanham. The highway was constructed along the right of way of the abandoned Washington, Baltimore and Annapolis Electric Railway (WB&A) in the early 1940s. In the late 1950s and early 1960s, MD 704 served as a temporary routing of U.S. Route 50 (US 50) while the U.S. Highway's freeway was under construction from Washington to Lanham. The route was expanded to a divided highway between Seat Pleasant and US 50 in the late 1960s and early 1970s. MD 704 was completed as a divided highway when the portion east of US 50 was expanded in the late 1990s.

== Route description ==
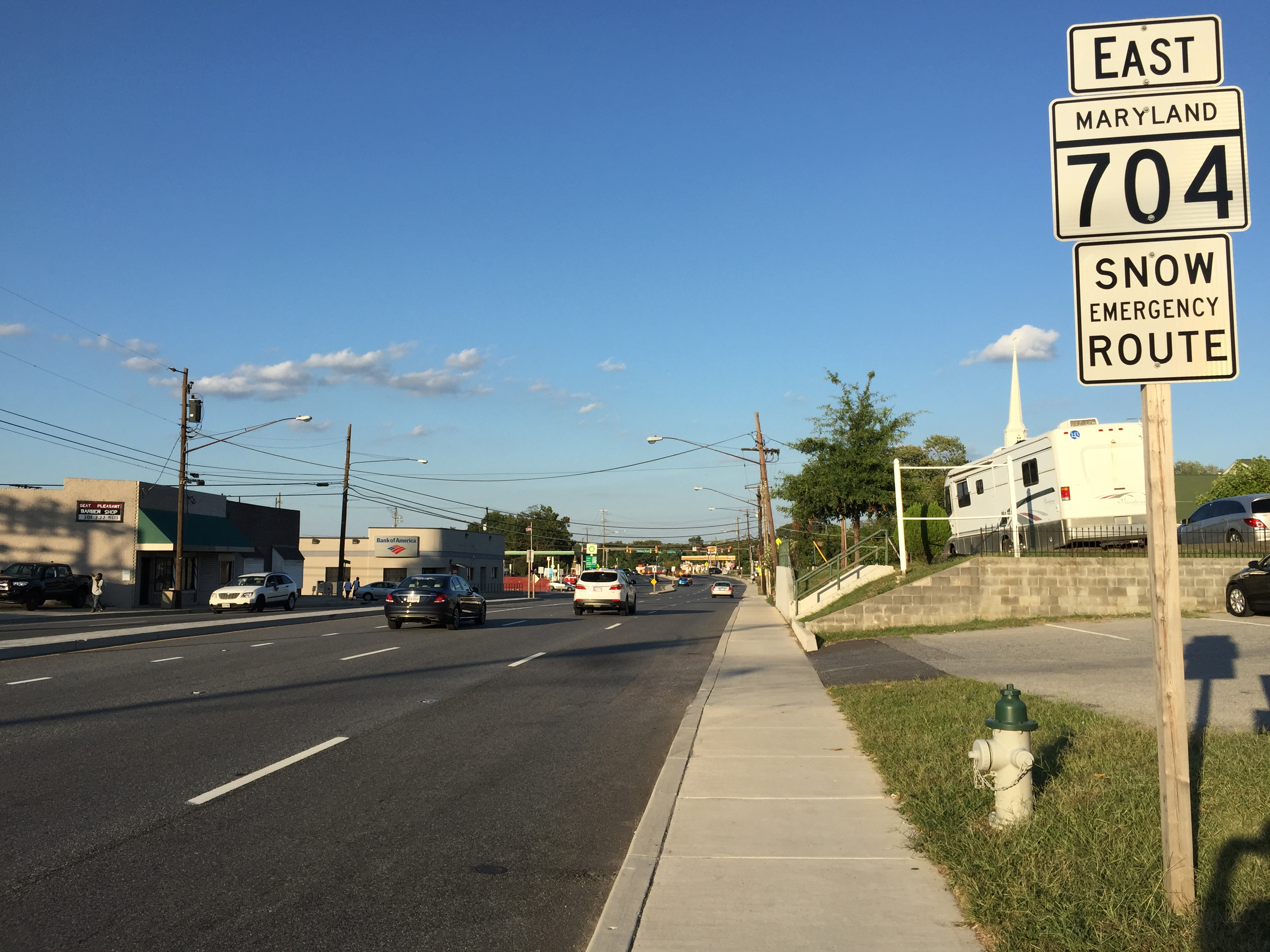
View east along MD 704 (Martin Luther King Jr. Highway) in Seat Pleasant

MD 704 begins at an intersection with Eastern Avenue near the eastern corner of the District of Columbia. The highway continues south as 63rd Street, which heads south toward Southern Avenue and East Capitol Street. MD 704 heads northeast as a six-lane divided highway through the city of Seat Pleasant, where the highway intersects Addison Road at staggered intersections. Addison Road leads to St. Matthew's Church, which is also known as the Addison Chapel. After leaving the city, the state highway crosses Cabin Branch and intersects Sheriff Road at an oblique angle. MD 704 passes through Landover, where the highway traverses Cattail Branch and meets MD 202 (Landover Road) at a full cloverleaf interchange. The highway continues through the city of Glenarden, where the highway intersects Ardwick Ardmore Road and crosses over Interstate 95 (I-95)/I-495 (Capital Beltway) without access. MD 704 drops to four lanes again between Ardwick Ardmore Road and the five-ramp partial cloverleaf interchange at US 50 (John Hanson Highway), which is also unsigned I-595. The interchange includes a direct ramp to northbound I-95/I-495 toward Baltimore; the ramp to westbound US 50 is used to access southbound I-95/I-495 toward Richmond. MD 704 continues northeast as a six-lane highway across Bald Hill Branch and veers east before reaching its eastern terminus at MD 450 (Annapolis Road) in Lanham.

MD 704 is a part of the National Highway System as a principal arterial from US 50 to MD 450 in Lanham.

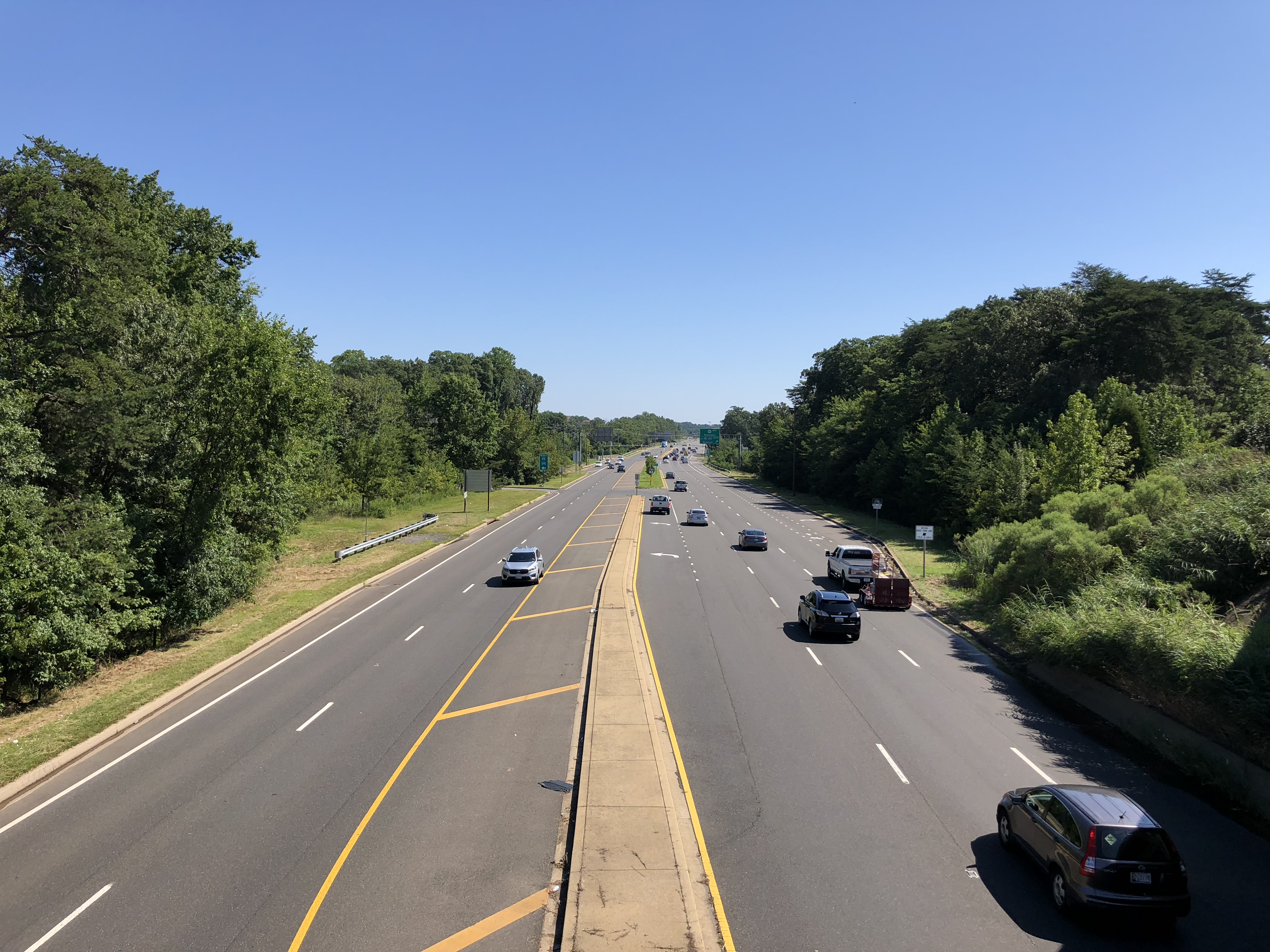
View east along MD 704 from I-595/US 50 in Lanham

== History ==
MD 704 follows the abandoned right of way of the defunct WB&A Railway, an interurban railroad that included a north–south line between Washington and Baltimore and a branch to Annapolis from Naval Academy Junction in Odenton. Construction on the electric railway began in 1902 and service began between the three cities in 1908. The WB&A went into receivership in 1931 and shut down in 1935. The Maryland State Roads Commission converted the abandoned railroad right of way into a two-lane highway from the District of Columbia line to US 50 (now MD 450) near Lanham between 1942 and 1944. The WB&A had a pair of timber bridges across its right of way. The Chapel Road bridge in Seat Pleasant, which carried what was then MD 389 and is now Addison Road across the railroad, was removed; the junction was regraded as an intersection with the new highway. In 1944, the War Production Board authorized the replacement of MD 202's bridge across the abandoned railroad as one of the few non–war-effort highway projects federally funded during World War II. Construction on the new steel-and-concrete bridge began in late 1944 and was completed by 1946. Access between the grade-separated highways at the MD 202–MD 704 junction was via a pair of two-way ramps.

MD 704 was named for George N. Palmer, a banker and community leader in Seat Pleasant, by 1951. John Hanson Highway was constructed from US 301 in Bowie west to MD 704 between 1954 and 1957. MD 704 was expanded to a divided highway through the highway's interchange with the freeway as part of the construction. In addition to the current set of ramps, the interchange included loop ramps from westbound MD 704 to the eastbound freeway and from the westbound freeway to westbound MD 704. By 1958, the portion of MD 704 south of the freeway was marked as Temporary US 50. This temporary route extended west into Washington along newly completed East Capitol Street and the pair of Independence Avenue and Constitution Avenue to reconnect with US 50 at 2nd Street in Capitol Hill. US 50 remained along Defense Highway (now MD 450) from Bowie to Bladensburg and on Bladensburg Road and Maryland Avenue within the city until 1962, when the U.S. Highway was placed along the newly completed John Hanson Highway from Bowie to Washington and Temporary US 50 was removed from MD 704.

MD 704 was expanded to a divided highway from the District of Columbia boundary to Addison Road in Seat Pleasant in 1962. The segment of divided highway at the US 50 interchange was extended west to Ardwick Ardmore Road in Glenarden in 1969. MD 704's modern cloverleaf interchange with MD 202 was completed in 1971, the same year the former highway was expanded to a divided highway from Seat Pleasant to just north of the latter highway. The divided highway was extended southwest through Glenarden from Ardwick Ardmore Road to Glenarden Parkway in 1972 and to MD 202 in 1973. MD 704 was renamed for civil rights leader Martin Luther King Jr., in 1987. The highway's interchange with US 50 was rebuilt in 1991 in conjunction with the overhaul of the US 50–Capital Beltway interchange immediately to the west; two of the interchange's loop ramps with westbound MD 704 were removed. The MD 704 divided highway was extended east from the US 50 interchange to Forbes Boulevard in 1997 and Lottsford Vista Road in 1999. MD 704 and MD 450 were relocated at their junction to make MD 704 part of the east–west axis of a more orthogonal intersection in 2000. This project was part of the expansion of the final segment of MD 704 and the adjacent portion of MD 450 to a divided highway.

== Junction list ==
The entire route is in Prince George's County.

Location	mi	km	Destinations	Notes
Seat Pleasant	0.00	0.00	63rd Street south / Eastern Avenue – Washington	District of Columbia boundary; western terminus
Landover	3.02	4.86	MD 202 (Landover Road) – Cheverly, Upper Marlboro	Cloverleaf interchange
Lanham	5.16	8.30	US 50 (John Hanson Highway) / I-95 / I-495 (Capital Beltway) – Annapolis, Washington, Baltimore, Richmond, New Carrollton Station	US 50 Exit 8; US 50 runs concurrently with unsigned I-595
Lanham	6.53	10.51	MD 450 (Annapolis Road) – New Carrollton, Bowie	Eastern terminus
1.000 mi = 1.609 km; 1.000 km = 0.621 mi

== Auxiliary route ==
MD 704A was the designation for an unnamed 0.15-mile (0.24 km) segment of old alignment of MD 704 at its junction with MD 450. The designation was assigned in 2000 when MD 704 and MD 450 were relocated. The MD 704A designation and the road itself were removed in 2004; the Vista Gardens shopping center now sits on the highway's general location.
