= San Isidro District, Grecia =

District in Grecia canton, Alajuela province, Costa Rica

San Isidro
- District
- San Isidro district
- San Isidro district location in Costa Rica
- Coordinates: 10.1319359°N 84.2715027°W
- Country: Costa Rica
- Province: Alajuela
- Canton: Grecia

Area
  - Total: 17.01 km^{2} (6.57 sq mi)
- Elevation: 1,290 m (4,230 ft)

Population (2011)
  - Total: 5,949
  - Density: 349.7/km^{2} (905.8/sq mi)
- Time zone: UTC−06:00
- Postal code: 20302

San Isidro is a district of the Grecia canton, in the Alajuela province of Costa Rica.

== Toponymy ==
It is named after Saint Isidore, a Catholic saint.

== Geography ==
San Isidro has an area of 17.01 km^{2} and an elevation of 1,290 metres. It is located on the slopes of Poás Volcano.

== Demographics ==
Historical population
Census	Pop.	±% p.a.
1892	793	—
1927	911	+0.40%
1950	1,439	+2.01%
1963	2,843	+5.38%
1973	3,271	+1.41%
1984	2,891	−1.12%
2000	5,201	+3.74%
2011	5,949	+1.23%
2022	6,844	+1.28%
Source: Instituto Nacional de Estadística y Censos; Centro Centroamericano de Población

For the 2011 census, San Isidro had a population of 5,949 inhabitants.

== Transportation ==
=== Road transportation ===
The district is covered by the following road routes:

- National Route 107
- National Route 120
- National Route 711
