= National Route 120 (Costa Rica) =

National Road Route in Costa Rica

National Secondary Route 120
- Ruta nacional secundaria 120

Route information
- Maintained by Ministry of Public Works and Transport
- Length: 15.100 km (9.383 mi)

Location
- Country: Costa Rica
- Provinces: Alajuela, Heredia

Highway system
- National Road Network of Costa Rica
← Route 119	→ Route 121

National Secondary Route 120, or just Route 120 (Spanish: Ruta Nacional Secundaria 120, or Ruta 120) is a National Road Route of Costa Rica located in the Alajuela and Heredia provinces.

== Description ==
In Alajuela province the route covers Alajuela canton (Sabanilla district), Grecia canton (San Isidro district), and Poás canton (San Juan, Sabana Redonda districts).

In Heredia province the route covers Heredia canton (Varablanca district).
