= Grecia (toucan) =

Toucan with 3D-printed beak

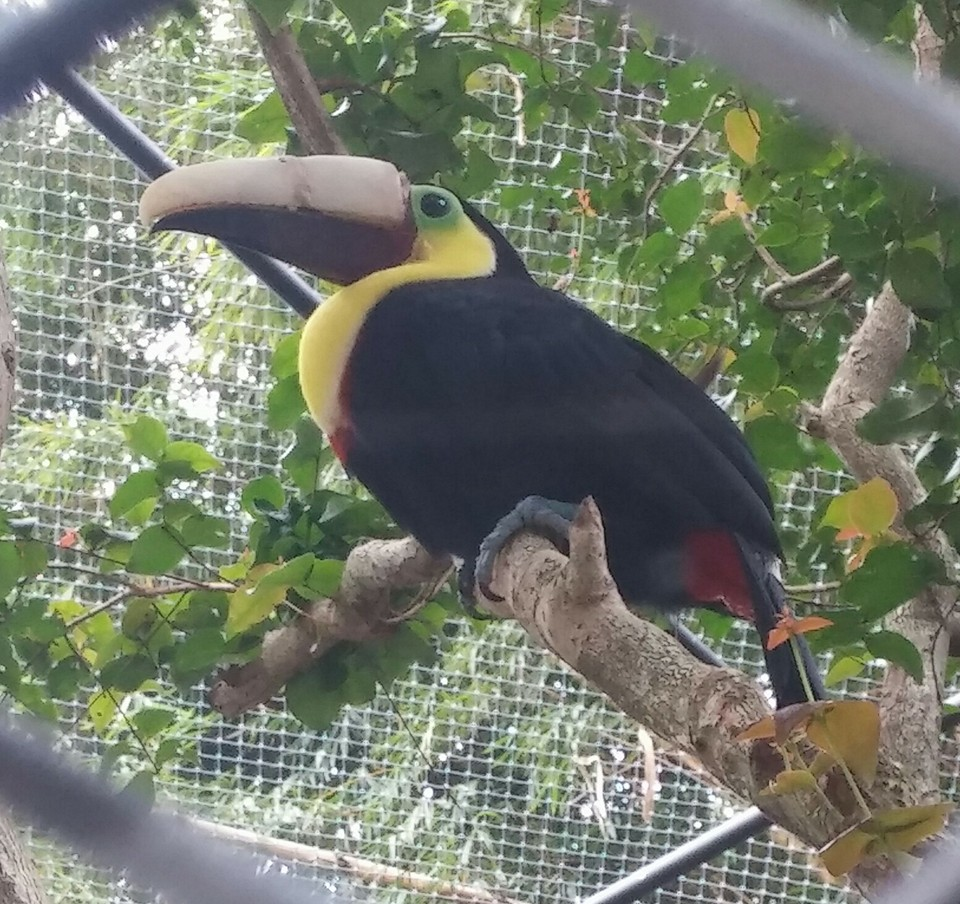
- Grecia, at the Rescate Wildlife Rescue Center
- Species: Yellow-throated toucan (Ramphastos ambiguus)
- Sex: unconfirmed
- Hatched: c. March 2014; Alajuela Province, Costa Rica
- Died: c. January 2022 (aged 7)
- Cause of death: Natural Causes
- Nationality: Costa Rica
- Known for: First toucan with a prosthetic beak

Grecia (c. March 2014 – c. January 2022) was a chestnut-mandibled toucan known as the first toucan to receive a prosthetic 3D-printed beak.

== Early life and injuries ==
Grecia hatched in the wild in or around Grecia, one of the cantons of Costa Rica, in approximately March 2014. The toucan was beaten by youths, and its top beak broke off. Government officials transported the bird to the animal rescue center Rescate Wildlife Rescue Center (formerly Rescate Animal Zoo Ave), west of the city of Alajuela. A few 3D printing companies joined efforts to create a prosthetic beak which was successfully attached to Grecia. The bird received its name from the town of Grecia where it was picked up by city officials. Grecia died in January 2022, per Zoo Ave employees.

== See also ==
- Victoria (goose)
- List of individual birds
