= Bolívar District, Grecia =

District in Grecia canton, Alajuela province, Costa Rica

Bolívar
- District
- Interactive map of Bolívar
- Bolívar district location in Costa Rica
- Coordinates: 10.1344699°N 84.2915542°W
- Country: Costa Rica
- Province: Alajuela
- Canton: Grecia

Area
  - Total: 30.77 km^{2} (11.88 sq mi)
- Elevation: 1,060 m (3,480 ft)

Population (2011)
  - Total: 7,265
  - Density: 236.1/km^{2} (611.5/sq mi)
- Time zone: UTC−06:00
- Postal code: 20308

Bolívar is a district of the Grecia canton, in the Alajuela province of Costa Rica.

== Geography ==
Bolívar has an area of 30.77 km^{2} and an elevation of 1,060 metres.

== Demographics ==
Historical population
Census	Pop.	±% p.a.
1950	1,417	—
1963	1,982	+2.61%
1973	2,807	+3.54%
1984	3,457	+1.91%
2000	6,324	+3.85%
2011	7,265	+1.27%
2022	9,716	+2.68%
Source: Instituto Nacional de Estadística y Censos; Centro Centroamericano de Población

For the 2011 census, Bolívar had a population of 7,265 inhabitants.

== Transportation ==
=== Road transportation ===
The district is covered by the following road routes:

- National Route 118
