= San Roque District, Grecia =

District in Grecia canton, Alajuela province, Costa Rica

San Roque
- District
- San Roque district
- San Roque district location in Costa Rica
- Coordinates: 10.1083779°N 84.3004655°W
- Country: Costa Rica
- Province: Alajuela
- Canton: Grecia

Area
  - Total: 27 km^{2} (10 sq mi)
- Elevation: 1,077 m (3,533 ft)

Population (2011)
  - Total: 11,132
  - Density: 410/km^{2} (1,100/sq mi)
- Time zone: UTC−06:00
- Postal code: 20304

San Roque is a district of the Grecia canton, in the Alajuela province of Costa Rica.

== Geography ==
San Roque has an area of 27 km^{2} and an elevation of 1,077 metres.

== Demographics ==
Historical population
Census	Pop.	±% p.a.
1883	510	—
1892	596	+1.75%
1927	2,063	+3.61%
1950	1,872	−0.42%
1963	3,108	+3.98%
1973	4,087	+2.78%
1984	5,559	+2.84%
2000	9,163	+3.17%
2011	11,132	+1.79%
2022	13,154	+1.53%
Source: Instituto Nacional de Estadística y Censos; Centro Centroamericano de Población

For the 2011 census, San Roque had a population of 11,132 inhabitants.

== Transportation ==
=== Road transportation ===
The district is covered by the following road routes:

- National Route 118
- National Route 711
