= San Pedro de Poás =

District in Poás canton, Alajuela province, Costa Rica

San Pedro
- District
- San Pedro district
- San Pedro district location in Costa Rica
- Coordinates: 10.0820608°N 84.2483893°W
- Country: Costa Rica
- Province: Alajuela
- Canton: Poás

Area
  - Total: 13.63 km^{2} (5.26 sq mi)
- Elevation: 1,148 m (3,766 ft)

Population (2011)
  - Total: 7,554
  - Density: 554.2/km^{2} (1,435/sq mi)
- Time zone: UTC−06:00
- Postal code: 20801

San Pedro is a district of the Poás canton, in the Alajuela province of Costa Rica.

== Geography ==
San Pedro has an area of 13.63 km^{2} and an elevation of 1,148 metres. It is in the mountains of the Cordillera Central (Central Mountain Range) in Costa Rica. It is 13 kilometers northwest of the provincial capital city of Alajuela and 32 kilometers from the national capital city of San Jose.

== Demographics ==
Historical population
| Census | Pop. | ±% p.a. |
|---|---|---|
| 1864 | 1,296 | — |
| 1892 | 1,591 | +0.74% |
| 1927 | 1,319 | −0.53% |
| 1950 | 1,945 | +1.70% |
| 1963 | 3,229 | +3.98% |
| 1973 | 3,995 | +2.15% |
| 1984 | 5,060 | +2.17% |
| 2000 | 6,913 | +1.97% |
| 2011 | 7,554 | +0.81% |
| 2022 | 9,322 | +1.93% |
Source: Instituto Nacional de Estadística y Censos; Centro Centroamericano de Población

For the 2011 census, San Pedro had a population of 7,554 inhabitants.

== Transportation ==
=== Road transportation ===
The district is covered by the following road routes:

- National Route 107
- National Route 130
- National Route 146
- National Route 723

== In popular culture ==
The protagonist in the book Baby Driver by Jan Kerouac spends time in San Pedro de Poás.
