= National Route 118 (Costa Rica) =

National Road Route in Costa Rica

National Secondary Route 118
- Ruta nacional secundaria 118

Route information
- Maintained by Ministry of Public Works and Transport
- Length: 29.100 km (18.082 mi)

Location
- Country: Costa Rica
- Provinces: Alajuela

Highway system
- National Road Network of Costa Rica
| ← Route 117 | → Route 119 |

National Secondary Route 118, or just Route 118 (Spanish: Ruta Nacional Secundaria 118, or Ruta 118) is a National Road Route of Costa Rica located in the Alajuela province.

== Description ==
In Alajuela province the route covers Alajuela canton (San José, Tambor districts), Grecia canton (Grecia, San Roque, Tacares, Puente de Piedra, Bolívar districts), Naranjo canton (Naranjo district), Poás canton (Carrillos district), and Sarchí canton (Sarchí Norte, Sarchí Sur, San Pedro districts).
