= National Route 717 (Costa Rica) =

National Road Route in Costa Rica

National Tertiary Route 717
- Ruta nacional terciaria 717

Route information
- Maintained by Ministry of Public Works and Transport
- Length: 8.690 km (5.400 mi)

Location
- Country: Costa Rica
- Provinces: Alajuela

Highway system
- National Road Network of Costa Rica
← Route 716	→ Route 718

National Tertiary Route 717, or just Route 717 (Spanish: Ruta Nacional Terciaria 717, or Ruta 717) is a National Road Route of Costa Rica located in the Alajuela province.

== Description ==
In Alajuela province the route covers Grecia canton (Tacares and Puente de Piedra districts).
