= Sabana Redonda =

District in Poás canton, Alajuela province, Costa Rica

- District
- Sabana Redonda district
- Sabana Redonda district location in Costa Rica
- Coordinates: 10.1493139°N 84.2136218°W
- Country: Costa Rica
- Province: Alajuela
- Canton: Poás

Area
  - Total: 20.33 km^{2} (7.85 sq mi)
- Elevation: 1,440 m (4,720 ft)

Population (2011)
  - Total: 2,343
  - Density: 115.2/km^{2} (298.5/sq mi)
- Time zone: UTC−06:00
- Postal code: 20805

Sabana Redonda is a district of the Poás canton, in the Alajuela province of Costa Rica.

== Geography ==
Sabana Redonda has an area of 20.33 km^{2} and an elevation of 1,440 metres.

== Demographics ==
Historical population
Census	Pop.	±% p.a.
1927	281	—
1950	481	+2.36%
1963	557	+1.13%
1973	582	+0.44%
1984	883	+3.86%
2000	2,187	+5.83%
2011	2,343	+0.63%
2022	3,952	+4.87%
Source: Instituto Nacional de Estadística y Censos; Centro Centroamericano de Población

For the 2011 census, Sabana Redonda had a population of 2,343 inhabitants.

== Transportation ==
=== Road transportation ===
The district is covered by the following road routes:

- National Route 120
- National Route 146
