= Glenarden, Maryland =

- City
- Flag Seal
- Motto: "A City On The Move"
- Location of Glenarden, Maryland
- Coordinates: 38°55′55″N 76°51′42″W
- Country: United States
- State: Maryland
- County: Prince George's
- Founded: 1919
- Incorporated: March 30, 1939

Area
  - Total: 1.20 sq mi (3.10 km^{2})
  - Land: 1.20 sq mi (3.10 km^{2})
  - Water: 0 sq mi (0.00 km^{2})
- Elevation: 102 ft (31 m)

Population (2020)
  - Total: 6,402
  - Density: 5,352/sq mi (2,066.6/km^{2})
- Time zone: UTC-5 (Eastern (EST))
  - Summer (DST): UTC-4 (EDT)
- ZIP codes: 20706, 20774
- Area codes: 301, 240
- FIPS code: 24-32500
- GNIS feature ID: 0597453
- Website: www.cityofglenarden.org

Glenarden is a city in Prince George's County, Maryland, United States. Per the 2020 census, the population was 6,402.

== History ==
Glenarden was developed in 1919, when W. R. Smith purchased a group of properties approximately 10 miles east of Washington, and established a residential community of 15 people. Three decades later, under the banner of the Civic Association, the African-American, middle-class suburban community that had developed from Smith's venture petitioned the State Legislature for incorporation as the Town of Glenarden. The charter was granted on March 30, 1939, making Glenarden the third predominantly Black incorporated town in the State of Maryland. W. H. Swann was elected as its first mayor.

== Geography ==
Glenarden is located at 38°55′55″N 76°51′42″W (38.932061, -76.861648).

According to the United States Census Bureau, the city has a total area of 1.22 square miles (3.16 km^{2}), all land.

== Demographics ==
Historical population
Census	Pop.	Note	%±
1950	492		—
1960	1,336		171.5%
1970	4,447		232.9%
1980	4,993		12.3%
1990	5,025		0.6%
2000	6,318		25.7%
2010	6,000		−5.0%
2020	6,402		6.7%
U.S. Decennial Census; 2010 2020

=== Racial and ethnic composition ===
Glenarden city, Maryland – Racial and ethnic composition Note: the US Census treats Hispanic/Latino as an ethnic category. This table excludes Latinos from the racial categories and assigns them to a separate category. Hispanics/Latinos may be of any race.
Race / Ethnicity (NH = Non-Hispanic)	Pop 2000	Pop 2010	Pop 2020	% 2000	% 2010	% 2020
White alone (NH)	50	36	100	0.79%	0.60%	1.56%
Black or African American alone (NH)	6,043	5,466	4,953	95.65%	91.10%	77.37%
Native American or Alaska Native alone (NH)	23	14	8	0.36%	0.23%	0.12%
Asian alone (NH)	41	38	81	0.65%	0.63%	1.27%
Native Hawaiian or Pacific Islander alone (NH)	2	1	0	0.03%	0.02%	0.00%
Other race alone (NH)	12	4	23	0.19%	0.07%	0.36%
Mixed race or Multiracial (NH)	99	79	235	1.57%	1.32%	3.67%
Hispanic or Latino (any race)	48	362	1,002	0.76%	6.03%	15.65%
Total	6,318	6,000	6,402	100.00%	100.00%	100.00%

=== 2020 census ===
As of the 2020 census, Glenarden had a population of 6,402. The median age was 37.0 years. 25.6% of residents were under the age of 18 and 14.4% were 65 years of age or older. For every 100 females there were 83.7 males, and for every 100 females age 18 and over there were 78.2 males.

100.0% of residents lived in urban areas, while 0.0% lived in rural areas.

There were 2,146 households, of which 40.9% had children under the age of 18 living in them. Of all households, 38.1% were married-couple households, 15.5% were households with a male householder and no spouse or partner present, and 41.5% were households with a female householder and no spouse or partner present. About 22.6% of all households were made up of individuals, and 8.6% had someone living alone who was 65 years of age or older.

There were 2,215 housing units, of which 3.1% were vacant. The homeowner vacancy rate was 1.2% and the rental vacancy rate was 4.5%.

=== 2010 census ===
As of the census of 2010, there were 6,000 people, 2,077 households, and 1,535 families living in the city. The population density was 4,918.0 inhabitants per square mile (1,898.9/km^{2}). There were 2,256 housing units at an average density of 1,849.2 per square mile (714.0/km^{2}). The racial makeup of the city was 2.4% White, 92.1% African American, 0.3% Native American, 0.6% Asian, 2.9% from other races, and 1.7% from two or more races. Hispanic or Latino of any race were 6.0% of the population.

There were 2,077 households, of which 44.8% had children under the age of 18 living with them, 30.4% were married couples living together, 37.6% had a female householder with no husband present, 6.0% had a male householder with no wife present, and 26.1% were non-families. 23.1% of all households were made up of individuals, and 7.2% had someone living alone who was 65 years of age or older. The average household size was 2.89 and the average family size was 3.36.

The median age in the city was 31.5 years. 31.2% of residents were under the age of 18; 10.3% were between the ages of 18 and 24; 25.3% were from 25 to 44; 21.8% were from 45 to 64; and 11.6% were 65 years of age or older. The gender makeup of the city was 43.8% male and 56.2% female.

=== 2000 census ===
As of the census of 2000, there were 6,318 people, 2,078 households, and 1,664 families living in the city. The population density was 4,828.9 inhabitants per square mile (1,864.4/km^{2}). There were 2,167 housing units at an average density of 1,656.3 per square mile (639.5/km^{2}). The racial makeup of the city was 0.85% White, 95.77% African American, 0.36% Native American, 0.65% Asian, 0.03% Pacific Islander, 0.36% from other races, and 1.96% from two or more races. Hispanic or Latino of any race were 0.76% of the population.

There were 2,078 households, out of which 41.5% had children under the age of 18 living with them, 37.9% were married couples living together, 36.7% had a female householder with no husband present, and 19.9% were non-families. 17.7% of all households were made up of individuals, and 5.0% had someone living alone who was 65 years of age or older. The average household size was 3.04 and the average family size was 3.39.

In the city, the population was spread out, with 35.6% under the age of 18, 7.8% from 18 to 24, 27.0% from 25 to 44, 20.0% from 45 to 64, and 9.6% who were 65 years of age or older. The median age was 31 years. For every 100 females, there were 79.9 males. For every 100 females age 18 and over, there were 68.7 males.

The median income for a household in the city was $44,583, and the median income for a family was $45,932. Males had a median income of $37,961 versus $32,953 for females. The per capita income for the city was $18,578. About 15.9% of families and 15.6% of the population were below the poverty line, including 25.0% of those under age 18 and 7.5% of those age 65 or over.

== Transportation ==
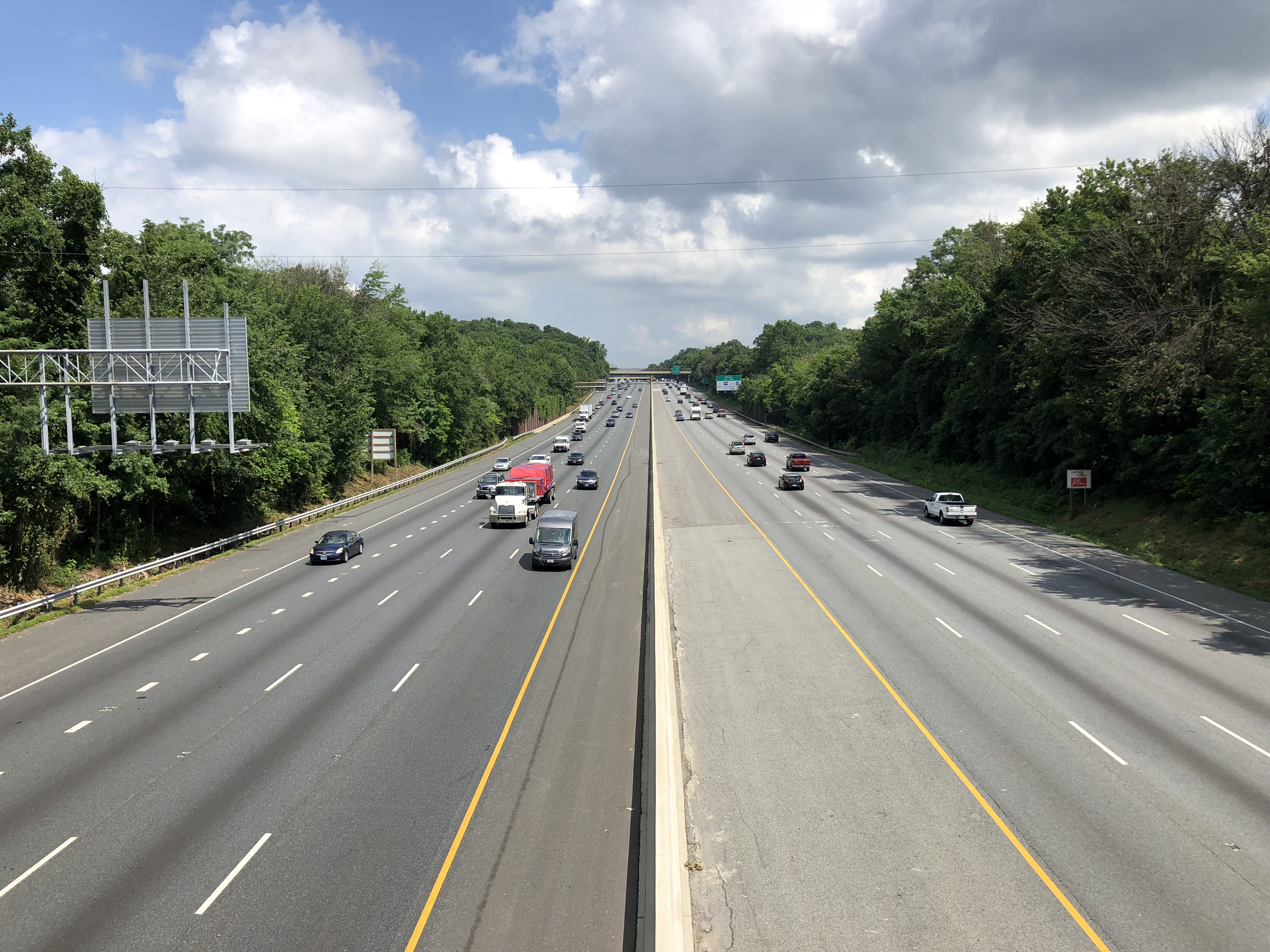
I-95/I-495 northbound in Glenarden

The most prominent highway passing through Glenarden is Interstate 95/Interstate 495 (the Capital Beltway). I-495 follows the Capital Beltway around Washington, D.C., providing access to its many other suburbs. I-95 only follows the eastern portion of the beltway, diverging away from the beltway near both its north and south ends. To the north, I-95 passes through Baltimore, Philadelphia, New York City and Boston on its way to Canada, while to the south, it traverses Richmond on its way to Florida.

However, there is no direct access to Glenarden from I-95/I-495. The primary connection is via its interchange with Maryland Route 202 just south of the city limits, which connects to Maryland Route 704 and other minor roads which pass directly through the city.

Glenarden is near the New Carrollton Metro Station to the north and Landover Metro station to the west. Both stations reside on the Orange Line of the Washington Metro system. New Carrollton will be the eastern end of the Purple Line light rail system, which will also connect to the Red, Green and Yellow lines in the Metro system. The Purple Line is under construction as of 2022 and is scheduled to open in 2026.

== Government ==
The City of Glenarden City Council consists of seven Councilmembers who hold office for a term of four years or until their successors take office. All City Councilmembers will be elected at-large, replacing the previous ward-based system. The City Council is the City's legislative body with the power to enact all ordinances and resolutions. The Vice Mayor is selected by the Mayor & Council within the first month of a new term. Elections are on the first Monday of May, and the newly elected are sworn in at the May Town Meeting on the 2nd Thursday of the Month.

The current elected Mayor and Council are: Mayor Derek D. Curtis, II, Mayor Pro Tem Angela D. Ferguson, Council Member Cashenna A. Cross (At-Large), Council Member Maurice A. Hairston (At-Large), Council Member James A. Herring (At-Large), Council Member Robin Jones (At-Large) and Council Member Donjuan L. Williams (At-Large). The council body was elected in 2025.

== Education ==
The city is a part of the Prince George's County Public Schools.

The following zoned elementary schools serve portions of the city:

- Ardmore Elementary School
- Dodge Park Elementary School
- Kingsford Elementary School
- William Paca Elementary School
- Judge Sylvania W. Woods, Sr. Elementary School

Glenarden also has Glenarden Woods Elementary School, a non-zoned school.

The following middle schools serve portions of the city: Kenmoor and Ernest Everett Just. The following high schools serve portions of the city: DuVal High School and Charles H. Flowers High School.

== Adjacent areas ==
- Springdale (Northeast)
- Palmer Park (Southwest)
- Capitol Heights (Southwest)
- Lanham (Northwest)
