= List of highways numbered 726 =

The following highways are numbered 726:

== Costa Rica ==
- National Route 726

== United States ==
- Georgia State Route 726 (former)
- Louisiana Highway 726
- Maryland Route 726
- Nevada State Route 726
- New Jersey:
  - County Route 726 (Camden County, New Jersey)
  - County Route 726 (Cumberland County, New Jersey)
  - County Route 726 (Hudson County, New Jersey)
- Ohio State Route 726
- Virginia
  - Virginia State Route 726 (Norfolk and Princess Anne Counties) (former)
  - Virginia State Route 726 (1931-1933) (former)

Preceded by 725	Lists of highways 726	Succeeded by 727
