= Poás (canton) =

Canton in Alajuela province, Costa Rica

- Canton
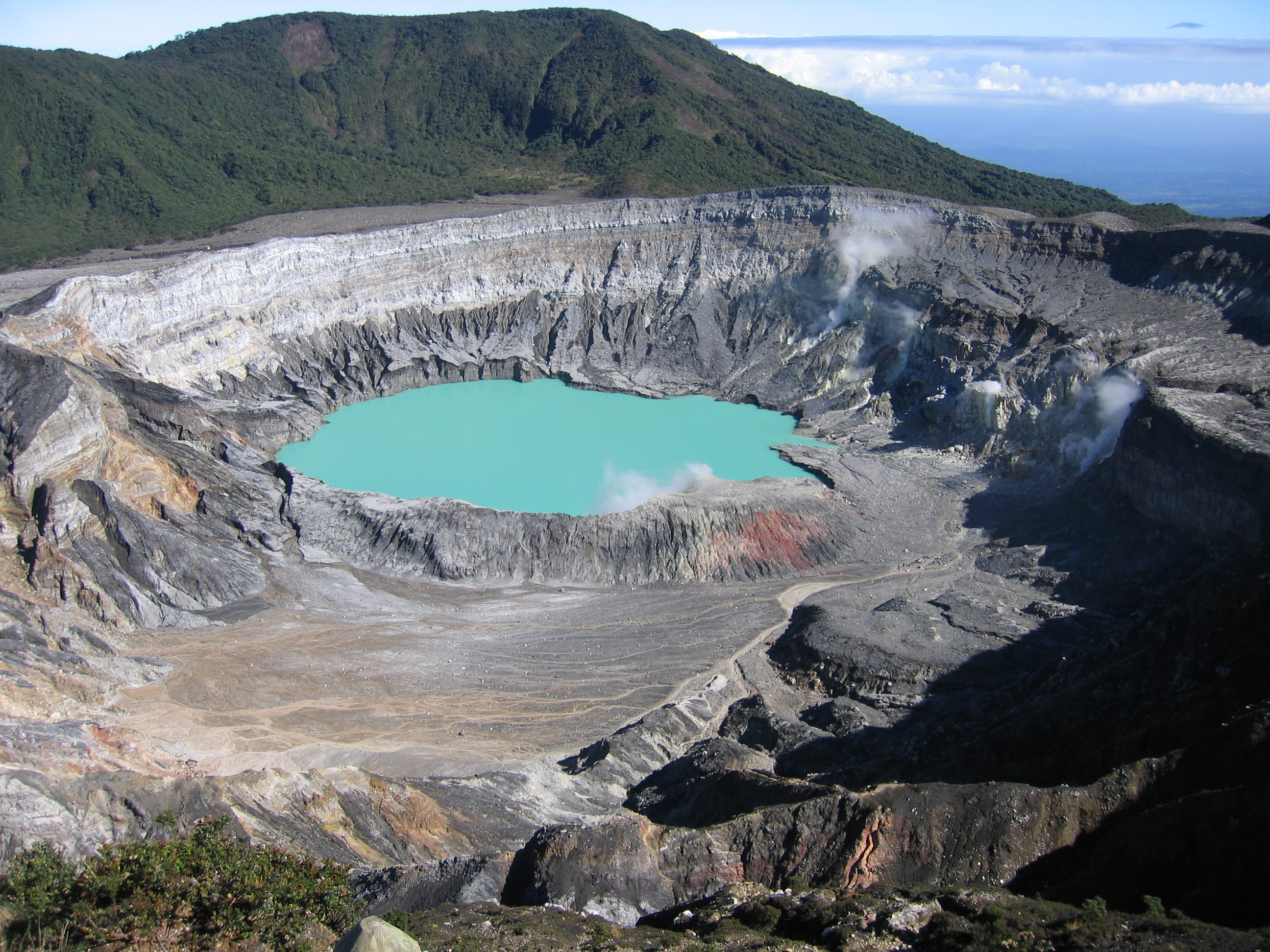
- Poás Volcano crater

- Flag
- Poás canton
- Poás canton location in Alajuela Province Poás canton location in Costa Rica
- Coordinates: 10.1060104°N 84.2475285°W
- Country: Costa Rica
- Province: Alajuela
- Creation: 15 October 1901
- Head city: San Pedro
- Districts: Districts: San Pedro; San Juan; San Rafael; Carrillos; Sabana Redonda

Government
  - Type: Municipality
  - Body: Municipalidad de Poás

Area
  - Total: 73.84 km^{2} (28.51 sq mi)
- Elevation: 1,184 m (3,885 ft)

Population (2011)
  - Total: 29,199
  - Density: 395.4/km^{2} (1,024/sq mi)
- Time zone: UTC−06:00
- Canton code: 208
- Website: poasdigital.go.cr

Poás is a canton in the Alajuela province of Costa Rica. The head city of the canton is San Pedro.

== Toponymy ==
Named for Poás Volcano.

== History ==
Poás was created on 15 October 1901 by decree 14.

== Geography ==
Poás has an area of 73.84 km^{2} (28.51 sq mi) and a mean elevation of 1,184 metres.

The elongated canton sits among the ridges and valleys on the southern slope of Poás Volcano. The Poás and Poasito rivers form its eastern border, while the Prendes and Tacares rivers limit the canton to the west. Poás Volcano is the canton's northernmost point.

== Districts ==
The canton of Poás is subdivided into the following districts:

1. San Pedro
2. San Juan
3. San Rafael
4. Carrillos
5. Sabana Redonda

== Demographics ==
Historical population
Census	Pop.	±% p.a.
1927	3,570	—
1950	5,135	+1.59%
1963	8,179	+3.65%
1973	10,191	+2.22%
1984	13,939	+2.89%
2000	24,764	+3.66%
2011	29,199	+1.51%
2022	36,207	+1.97%
Source: Instituto Nacional de Estadística y Censos; Centro Centroamericano de Población

For the 2011 census, Poás had a population of 29,199 inhabitants.

== Transportation ==
=== Road transportation ===
The canton is covered by the following road routes:

- National Route 107
- National Route 118
- National Route 120
- National Route 130
- National Route 146
- National Route 723
