= List of highways numbered 721 =

The following highways are numbered 721:

== Costa Rica ==
- National Route 721

== United States ==
- Florida State Road 721 (former)
- Georgia State Route 721 (former)
- Nevada State Route 721 (former)
- New Jersey:
  - County Route 721 (Camden County, New Jersey)
  - County Route 721 (Cumberland County, New Jersey)
  - County Route 721 (Hudson County, New Jersey)
- Ohio State Route 721
- Puerto Rico Highway 721
- Virginia State Route 721 (1930-1933) (former)

Preceded by 720	Lists of highways 721	Succeeded by 722
