= National Route 711 (Costa Rica) =

National Road Route in Costa Rica

National Tertiary Route 711
- Ruta nacional terciaria 711

Route information
- Maintained by Ministry of Public Works and Transport
- Length: 4.795 km (2.979 mi)

Location
- Country: Costa Rica
- Provinces: Alajuela

Highway system
- National Road Network of Costa Rica
← Route 710	→ Route 712

National Tertiary Route 711, or just Route 711 (Spanish: Ruta Nacional Terciaria 711, or Ruta 711) is a National Road Route of Costa Rica, located in the Alajuela province.

== Description ==
In Alajuela province the route covers Grecia canton (Grecia, San Isidro, and San Roque districts).
