= National Route 146 (Costa Rica) =

National Road Route in Costa Rica

National Secondary Route 146
- Ruta nacional secundaria 146

Route information
- Maintained by Ministry of Public Works and Transport
- Length: 14.995 km (9.317 mi)

Location
- Country: Costa Rica
- Provinces: Alajuela

Highway system
- National Road Network of Costa Rica
← Route 145	→ Route 147

National Secondary Route 146, or just Route 146 (Spanish: Ruta Nacional Secundaria 146, or Ruta 146) is a National Road Route of Costa Rica located in the Alajuela province.

== Description ==
In Alajuela province the route covers Alajuela canton (Sabanilla district) and Poás canton (San Pedro, San Juan, and Sabana Redonda districts).
