= National Route 107 (Costa Rica) =

National Road Route in Costa Rica

National Secondary Route 107
- Ruta nacional secundaria 107

Route information
- Maintained by Ministry of Public Works and Transport
- Length: 22.140 km (13.757 mi)

Location
- Country: Costa Rica
- Provinces: Alajuela

Highway system
- National Road Network of Costa Rica
← Route 106	→ Route 108

National Secondary Route 107, or just Route 107 (Spanish: Ruta Nacional Secundaria 107, or Ruta 107) is a National Road Route of Costa Rica, located in the Alajuela province.

== Description ==
In Alajuela province the route covers Alajuela canton (Sabanilla, Tambor districts), Grecia canton (Grecia, San Isidro, San José districts), Poás canton (San Pedro, San Juan, San Rafael districts).
