= Maryland Route 725 =

State highway in Maryland, United States

Maryland Route 725

Route information
- Maintained by MDSHA
- Length: 1.86 mi (2.99 km)
- Existed: 1977–present
- Tourist routes: Star-Spangled Banner Scenic Byway

Major junctions
- West end: Brown Station Road in Upper Marlboro
- MD 717 in Upper Marlboro; MD 202 in Upper Marlboro
- East end: US 301 in Upper Marlboro

Location
- Country: United States
- State: Maryland
- Counties: Prince George's

Highway system
- Maryland highway system; Interstate; US; State; Scenic Byways
← MD 723	→ MD 726

Maryland Route 725 (MD 725) is a state highway in the U.S. state of Maryland. The state highway runs 1.86 miles (2.99 km) from Brown Station Road east to U.S. Route 301 (US 301) within Upper Marlboro. MD 725 is the old alignment of MD 4 through the county seat of Prince George's County. What is now MD 725 was constructed in the mid- to late 1910s and became MD 4 in 1927. After MD 4 bypassed Upper Marlboro in the early 1960s, the old highway through town became part of MD 408. After the Prince George's County segments of MD 408 were removed in the late 1970s, the remaining state-maintained highway through Upper Marlboro became MD 725.

== Route description ==
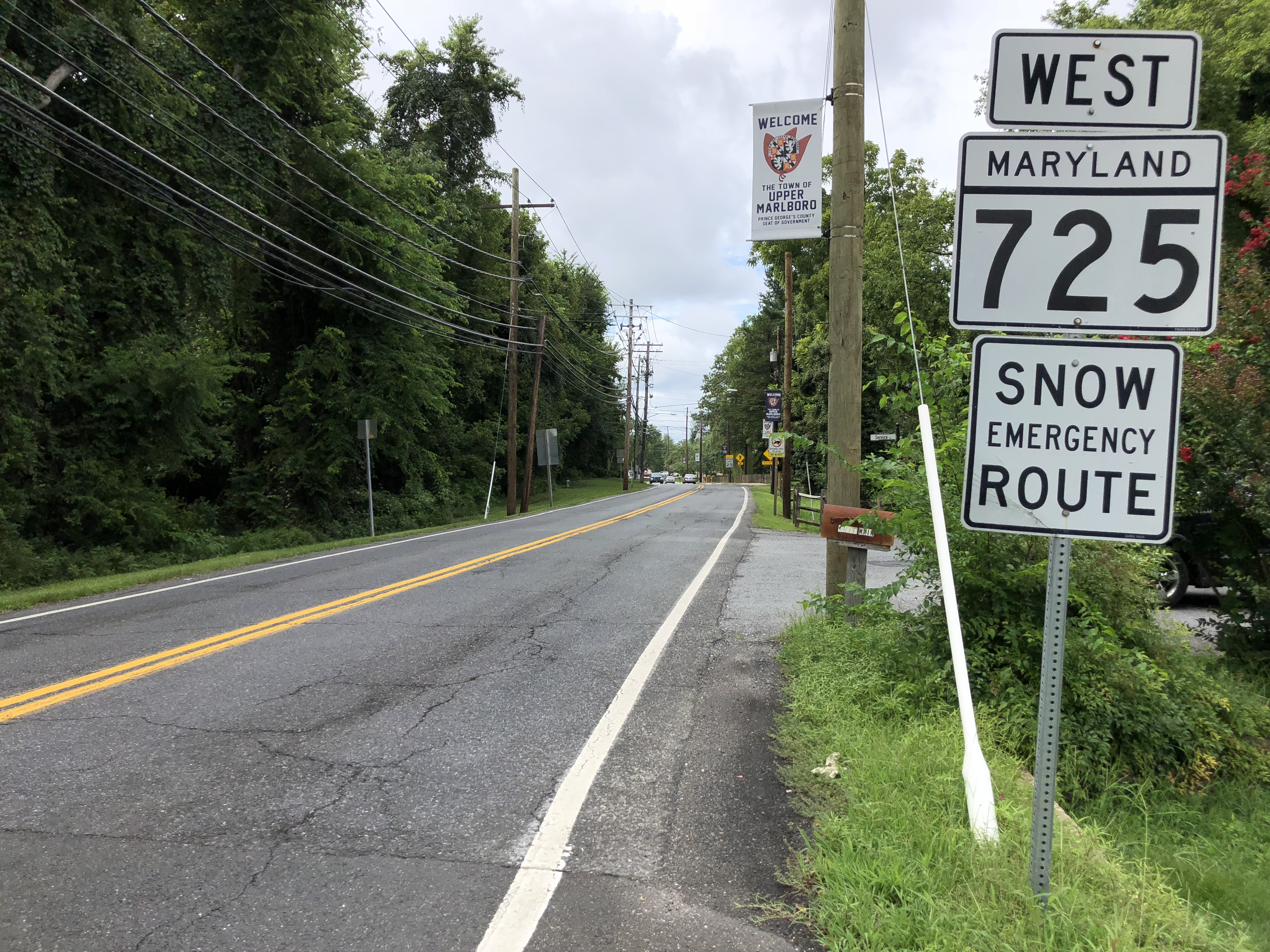
View west along MD 725 in Upper Marlboro

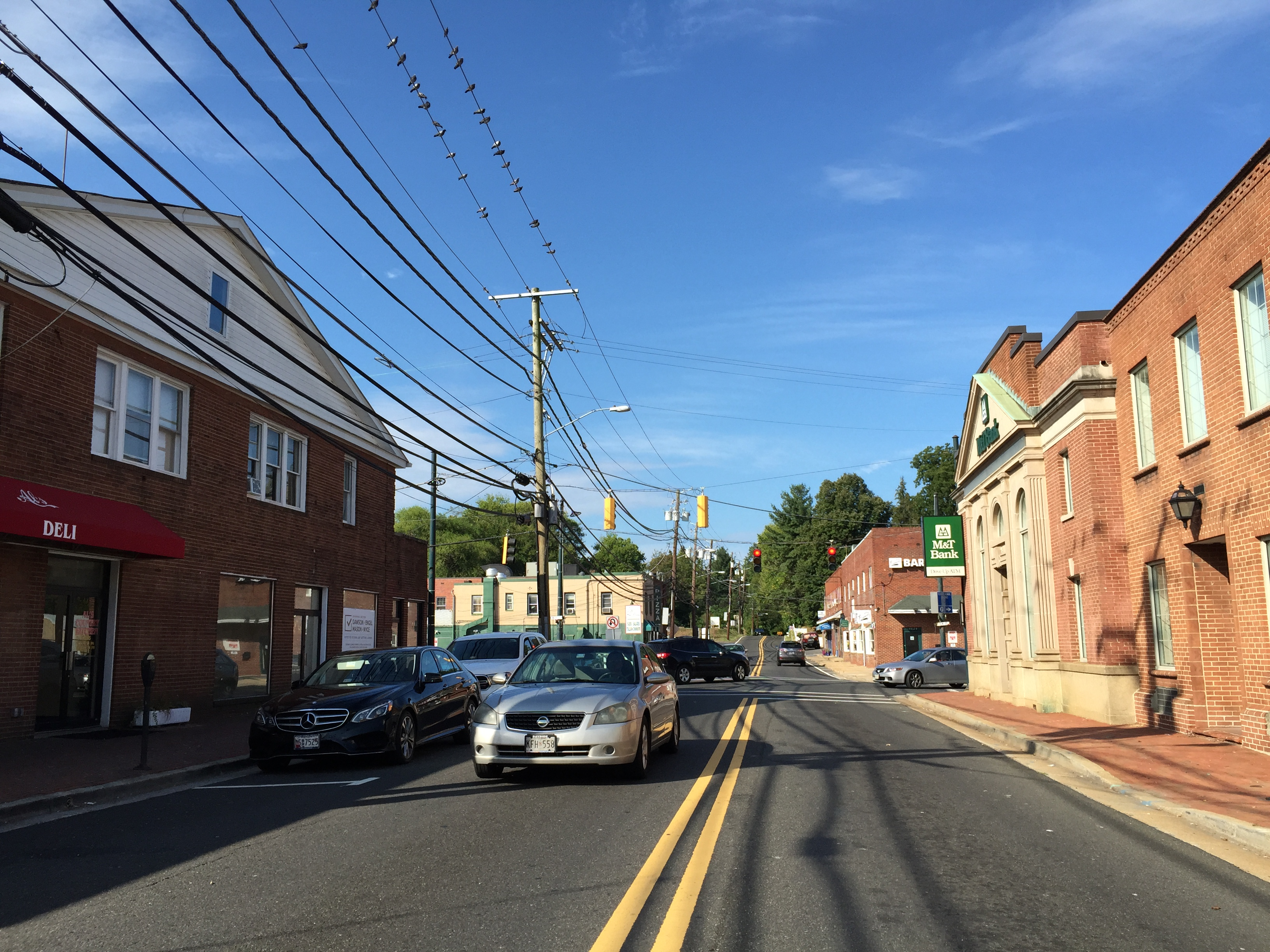
MD 725 westbound approaching MD 717 in Upper Marlboro

MD 725 begins at an intersection with Brown Station Road on the west side of Upper Marlboro. Old Marlboro Pike continues west as a county highway. The state highway heads east as a two-lane undivided road. After passing John Rogers Boulevard, MD 725 crosses Federal Spring Branch and enters the town limits of Upper Marlboro. The state highway curves south, then turns east at the intersection with Old Crain Highway, where the highway's name changes to Main Street. MD 725 heads into the downtown area, where the highway meets the northern end of MD 717 (Water Street) and passes many county buildings, including the county courthouse. The state highway passes Governor Oden Bowie Drive, where the highway's name changes to Marlboro Pike, and heads northeast out of the downtown area. MD 725 leaves the town limits by crossing the Western Branch of the Patuxent River and immediately meets the eastern end of MD 202 (Largo Road). The state highway passes several industrial buildings that cluster around the road's at-grade crossing of CSX's Popes Creek Subdivision railroad line. MD 725 reaches its eastern terminus at a cluster of restaurants surrounding the intersection with US 301 (Robert Crain Highway). Marlboro Pike continues east as a county highway.

MD 725 is a part of the National Highway System as a principal arterial from MD 202 to US 301.

== History ==
MD 725 is the old alignment of MD 4 through Upper Marlboro, which was part of the state road system drawn up by the Maryland State Roads Commission in 1909. West of Federal Spring Branch, the highway was originally part of the gravel Marlboro Turnpike. This segment was resurfaced as a macadam road by 1915. East of the Western Branch, the route was constructed as a 14-foot-wide (4.3 m) concrete road in 1915. The road through the town of Upper Marlboro was built as a concrete road between 1916 and 1919. The highway was widened with a pair of 3-foot-wide (0.91 m) concrete shoulders and resurfaced in 1926, and became part of MD 4 in 1927. Along its concurrency with US 301 through Upper Marlboro, MD 4 was widened with a pair of 3-foot-wide (0.91 m) concrete shoulders in 1946. The course of MD 725 was bypassed with the completion of MD 4's freeway bypass of Upper Marlboro between 1959 and 1962. In 1965, the old alignment of MD 4 from near Andrews Air Force Base to the junction with the freeway at the Patuxent River was designated MD 408 in addition to the presently existing segment of MD 408 between Waysons Corner and Lothian. The Prince George's County portion of MD 408 was transferred to county maintenance in 1977 with the exception of what is now MD 725, which received that designation by 1987.

== Junction list ==
The entire route is in Upper Marlboro, Prince George's County.

mi	km	Destinations	Notes
0.00	0.00	Old Marlboro Pike west / Brown Station Road north	Western terminus
0.78	1.26	MD 717 south (Water Street) to MD 4	Northern terminus of MD 717; MD 717 is unsigned
1.25	2.01	MD 202 north (Largo Road) – Bladensburg	Southern terminus of MD 202
1.86	2.99	US 301 (Robert Crain Highway) to MD 4 / Marlboro Pike east – Baltimore, Richmond	Eastern terminus
1.000 mi = 1.609 km; 1.000 km = 0.621 mi
