= List of highways numbered 727 =

The following highways are numbered 727:

== Canada ==
- Highway 727 (Saskatchewan)

== Costa Rica ==
- National Route 727

== United States ==
- SR 727
- MD 727
- PR-727
- FM 727

Preceded by 726	Lists of highways 727	Succeeded by 728
