= Rescate Wildlife Rescue Center =

Zoo in Costa Rica

- Rescate Wildlife Rescue Center
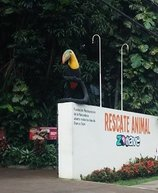
- Entrance to Zoo Ave
- Interactive map of Rescate Wildlife Rescue Center
- Type: Rescue Center. Sanctuary, non-profit.
- Location: Alajuela Province, Costa Rica
- Coordinates: 10°00′44″N 84°16′32″W
- Area: 340,000 square metres (84 acres)
- Created: August 1990
- Operator: Fundación Restauración de la Naturaleza
- Status: Open all year
- Website: https://www.rescatewildlife.org/

Rescate Wildlife Rescue Center, formerly Rescate Animal Zoo Ave, is an urban park of approximately 14 hectares (35 acres), located in La Garita, in the canton of Alajuela, Costa Rica. It has an average altitude of 814 meters and is bounded to the north by the bed of the river Rio Poas. The site includes the largest collection of bird species in Latin America.

It is administered by a conservation nonprofit foundation called Fundación Restauración de la Naturaleza, which also is responsible for the country's largest rehabilitation center in the Rescate Wildlife campus.

== History ==
Much of the land comprising the sanctuary was a coffee and sugar cane plantation area. Initially, it consisted of privately owned collection of about 50 animals. Because of its major expansion and pleasant climate, for many years appeared attempts to build on its premises a rescue center, but none materialized until the early 1990s when the property was to be administered by conservationist Dennis Janik, who lead the introduction of over a thousand trees in substitution of the coffee plantations. In 1995, the Costa Rican government approved the creation of an animal rescue venture within the zoo.

In the following decades, various species of birds originating from various parts of the country, in order to promote the concept of conservation of tropical habitat, were introduced.

Rescate Wildlife devotes part of its activity to research, captive breeding of species of tropical flora and fauna, including reptiles since 1999, environmental education, conservation, and rehabilitation of injured, orphan or recovered animal species.

== Attractions ==
Rescate Wildlife Rescue Center has an area of approximately 35 acres with a main nature trail circuit that displays wild animal enclosures and education against animal mistreating. A breeding center and the veterinary rescue center are in the Rescate Wildlife campus but off-limits to visitors.

== See also ==
- Grecia (toucan)
- List of zoos by country: Costa Rica zoos
