= National Route 723 (Costa Rica) =

National Road Route in Costa Rica

National Tertiary Route 723
- Ruta nacional terciaria 723

Route information
- Maintained by Ministry of Public Works and Transport
- Length: 8.480 km (5.269 mi)

Location
- Country: Costa Rica
- Provinces: Alajuela

Highway system
- National Road Network of Costa Rica
← Route 722	→ Route 725

National Tertiary Route 723, or just Route 723 (Spanish: Ruta Nacional Terciaria 723, or Ruta 723) is a National Road Route of Costa Rica located in the Alajuela province.

== Description ==
In Alajuela province the route covers Poás canton (San Pedro and Carrillos districts).
