= Mount Lubentia =

Historic house in Maryland, United States

- U.S. National Register of Historic Places
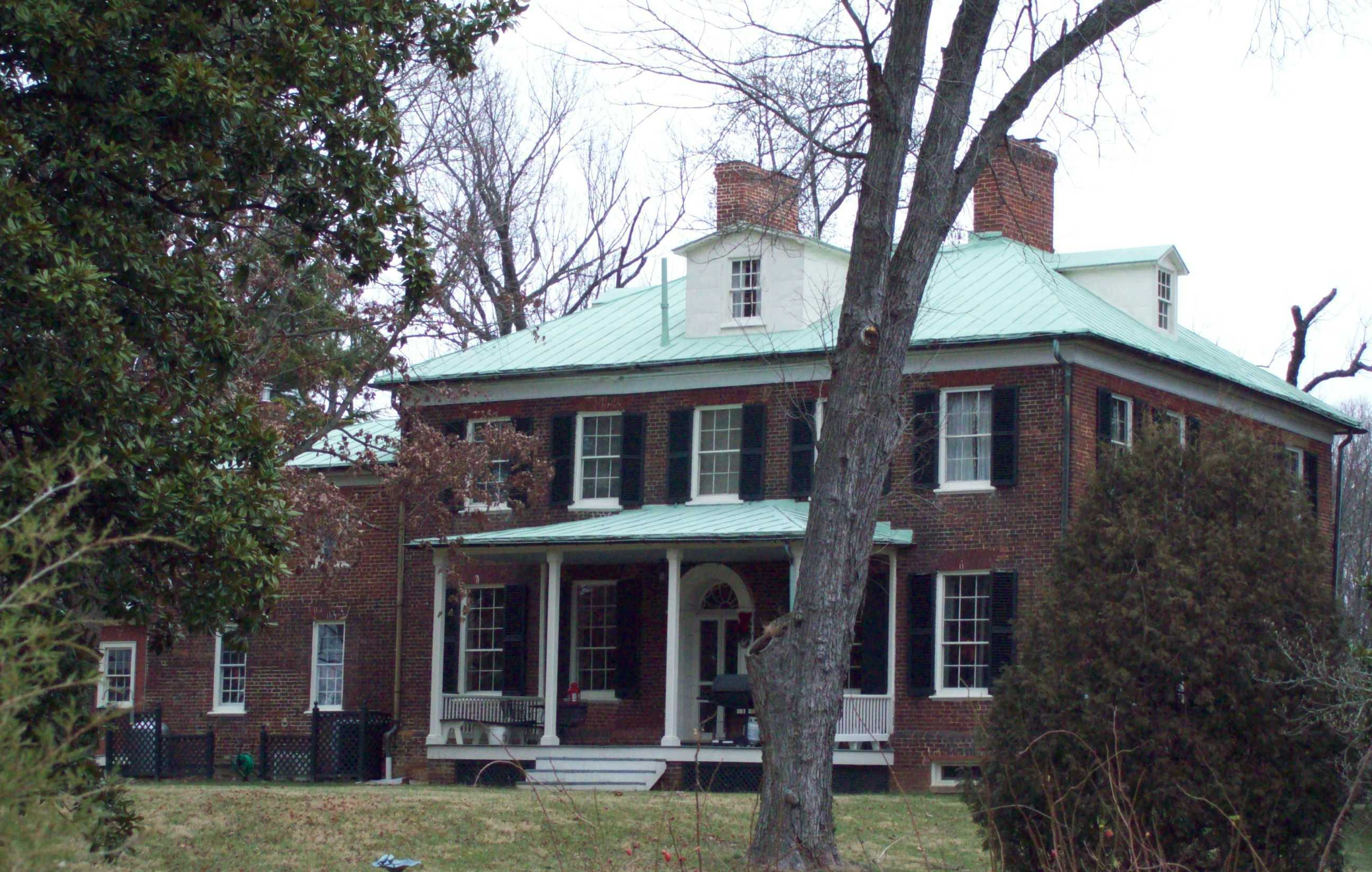
- Mount Lubentia, January 2009

- Location within Maryland Location within the United States
- Location: 603 Largo Rd., Largo, Maryland
- Coordinates: 38°52′55″N 76°48′59″W
- Area: 6.7 acres (2.7 ha)
- Built: 1798
- Architectural style: Federal
- NRHP reference No.: 87001033
- Added to NRHP: July 9, 1987

Mount Lubentia is a historic house located at Largo in Prince George's County, Maryland, United States. It is an elegantly detailed 2 1/2-story Georgian/Federal-style, Flemish bond brick house, probably built about 1760 and substantially renovated in the late 1790s, by Enoch Magruder and his son, Dennis of Harmony Hall.

The house was occupied by the Rev. Jonathan Boucher from 1771 to 1773 who described it as "a very tolerable house" in his Reminiscences of an American Loyalist, and remarked that his pupils dubbed the house "Castle Magruder." Among Boucher's students was Jackie Custis, George Washington's step-son, who lived with Boucher at Mount Lubentia during this period. George and Martha Washington visited on several occasions, as related in Washington's diary. Forrest Bowie, a direct descendant of Enoch Magruder, stated in an article written in the late 1930s that family tradition held that Dennis Magruder was born at Mount Lubentia in 1759. He was given the house and property by his father upon his marriage in 1779, when serving in the Maryland Line during the Revolutionary War. During the course of restoration by the owner over the past 15 years, evidence of earlier configuration, materials and finish has been discovered beneath the late 18th and early 19th century work now evident.

Also on the property and of significance in and of itself is the octagonal frame dairy which was moved onto the property in the 1970s from a nearby former plantation, "Graden." The dairy is the best surviving example of an architecturally conscious domestic outbuilding of the 18th century in the county, and possibly in the state. Also on the property is an 18th-century corncrib, described in the 1798 tax records.

Mount Lubentia was listed on the National Register of Historic Places in 1987.

== Gallery ==
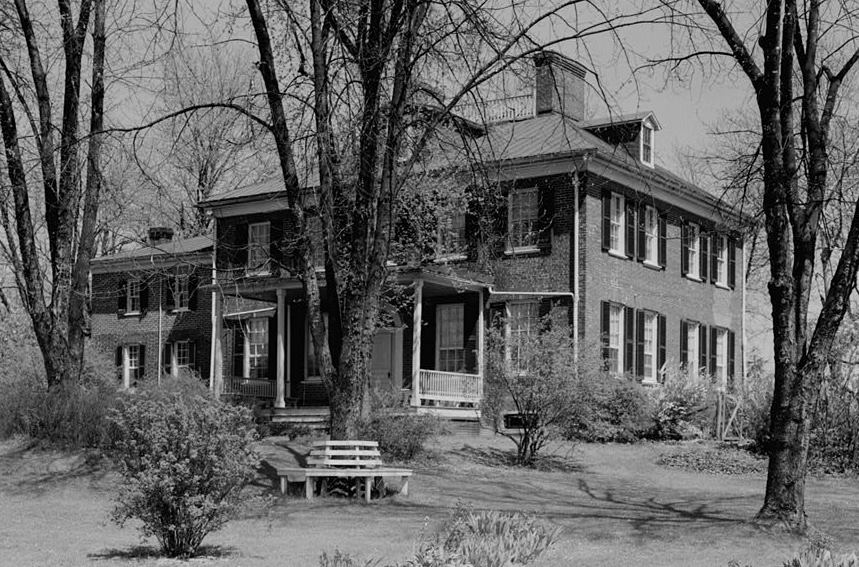
Mt. Lubentia, 1936 HABS Photo

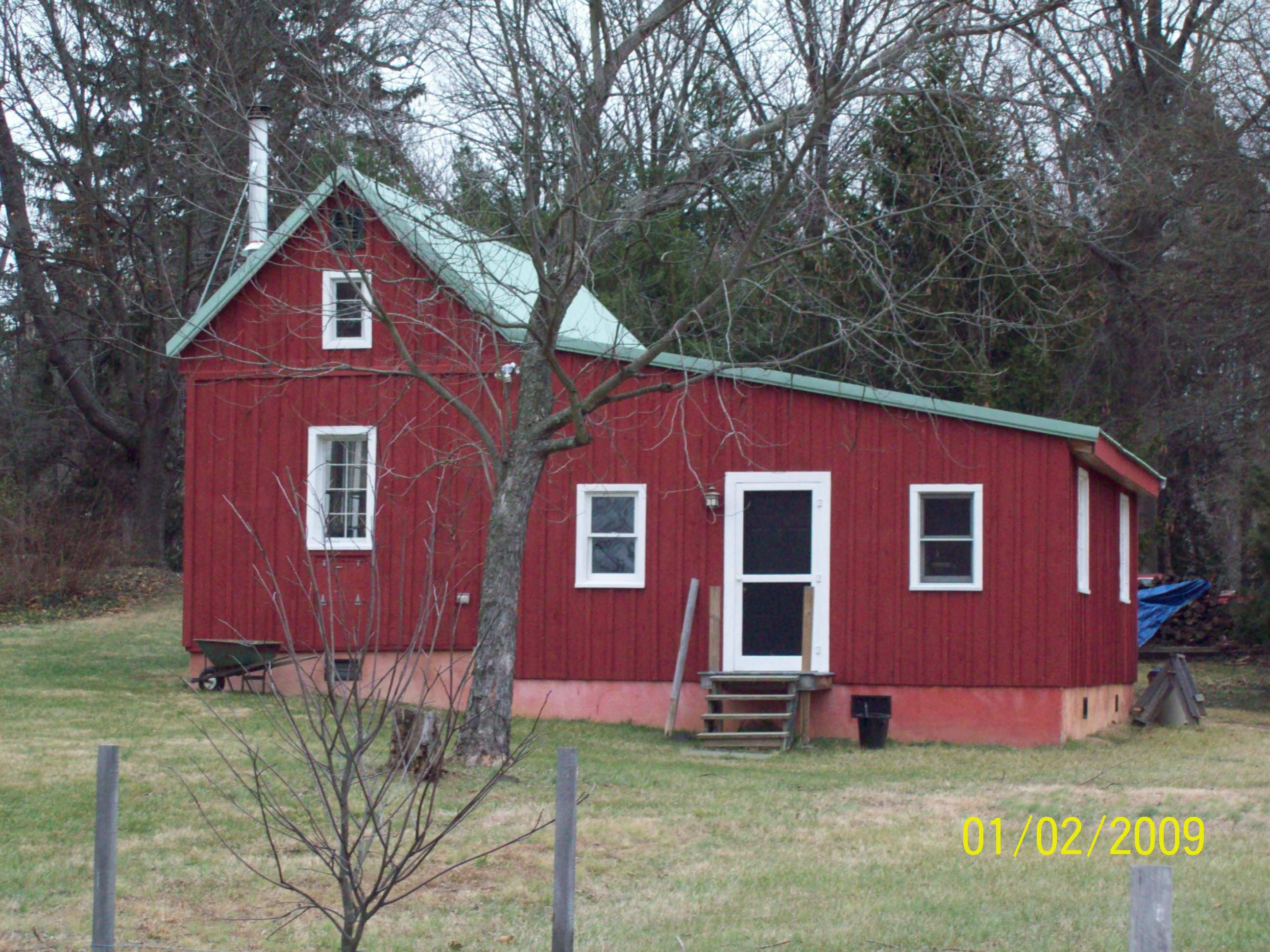
Mount Lubentia Stable, Largo, Md., January 2009
