= National Route 722 (Costa Rica) =

National Road Route in Costa Rica

National Tertiary Route 722
- Ruta nacional terciaria 722

Route information
- Maintained by Ministry of Public Works and Transport

Location
- Country: Costa Rica
- Provinces: Alajuela

Highway system
- National Road Network of Costa Rica
← Route 721	→ Route 723

National Tertiary Route 722, or just Route 722 (Spanish: Ruta Nacional Terciaria 722, or Ruta 722) is a National Road Route of Costa Rica located in the Alajuela province.
