= National Route 1856 (Costa Rica) =

Road route in Costa Rica

National Border Route 1856
- Ruta Juan Rafael Mora Porras

Route information
- Length: 160 km (99 mi)
- Existed: 2011–present
- History: Construction started in 2011; Inaugural act on 2012; Unfinished as of 2019

Major junctions
- East end: Route 760 (Primavera)
- Route 761 (Llano Verde); Route 250 (Boca Tapada); Route 510 (Boca La Ceiba)
- West end: Route 507 (Fátima)

Location
- Country: Costa Rica

Highway system
- National Road Network of Costa Rica

National Border Route 1856, whose official name is Ruta Juan Rafael Mora Porras (Juan Rafael Mora Porras route), and is also known as trocha fronteriza (border track), is an abandoned dirt road in Costa Rica on the south bank of the San Juan River.

== Description ==
Route 1856 follows the south bank of the San Juan River on the Costa Rica side, covering completely the northern border of the Heredia province with the eastern segment starting west of Boca San Carlos in Alajuela province.

== History ==
The route number designation corresponds to the year 1856, when the Battle of Santa Rosa and Second Battle of Rivas took place and stopped the advances of the filibusters going from Nicaragua to Costa Rica during the Filibuster War. The name alludes to the president at that moment, Juan Rafael Mora Porras.

The route was created due to the Costa Rica–Nicaragua San Juan River border dispute between 2010 and 2015, and it is an officially designated national road, it was deemed a strategic necessity and granted emergency status by presidential decree, because the border dispute put in jeopardy the access of the river by Costa Rica citizens who made daily use of the water body for transportation.

Construction started in 2011, with a projected cost of CRC ₡7,000 million, but as of 2019 the accumulated cost has been of up to CRC ₡30,000 million.

Its construction and political origins were highly controversial and surrounded by corruption issues with 26 indicted individuals, no design or environmental plans were made at all, not even a topographic survey, several of the bridges used old containers instead of proper concrete culverts, and tree trunks as bridges.

The road has not been finished, but an inaugural act on the segment between Fátima and Delta Costa Rica took place on February 17, 2012. Due to the fiscal crisis of the latter half of the 2010s in Costa Rica, it is currently abandoned as of April 2019 and there are no active plans to continue its construction, meanwhile the government tries to allocate the required funds.
