= San Rafael de Guatuso =

District in Guatuso canton, Alajuela province, Costa Rica

San Rafael
- District
- San Rafael district
- San Rafael district location in Costa Rica
- Coordinates: 10.6773286°N 84.8178228°W
- Country: Costa Rica
- Province: Alajuela
- Canton: Guatuso

Area
  - Total: 304.29 km^{2} (117.49 sq mi)
- Elevation: 50 m (160 ft)

Population (2011)
  - Total: 7,941
  - Density: 26.10/km^{2} (67.59/sq mi)
- Time zone: UTC−06:00
- Postal code: 21501

San Rafael is a district of the Guatuso canton in the Alajuela province of Costa Rica.

== History ==
San Rafael was granted the title of "ciudad" (city) by a law of May 4, 1970.

== Geography ==
San Rafael has an area of 304.29 km^{2} and an elevation of 50 metres.

It is located near the western edge of the San Carlos Plain (Llanura de San Carlos) in northern Costa Rica. It is 20 kilometers northeast of Lake Arenal, 40 kilometers southeast of Upala, 37 kilometers northwest of El Tanque, 90 kilometers northwest of Ciudad Quesada, 155 kilometers from the provincial capital city of Alajuela, and 183 kilometers from the national capital city of San José.

== Demographics ==
Historical population
Census	Pop.	±% p.a.
1892	87	—
1963	5,991	+6.14%
1973	2,810	−7.29%
1984	3,689	+2.51%
2000	6,611	+3.71%
2011	7,941	+1.68%
2022	8,728	+0.86%
Source: Instituto Nacional de Estadística y Censos; Centro Centroamericano de Población

For the 2011 census, San Rafael had a population of 7,941 inhabitants.

== Transportation ==
=== Road transportation ===
The district is covered by the following road routes:

- National Route 4
- National Route 143
- National Route 733

== Economy ==
San Rafael, often called Guatuso, is an agricultural town on the Río Frío and National Route 4. Cattle ranching and rice farming are major concerns in the area. The town has a gas station, banks, medical clinic, pharmacy, and a few basic restaurants and cabinas for lodging.

=== Tourism ===
- Caño Negro Wildlife Refuge: a watery lowland of lush sloughs and marshes, a seasonal lake, and abundant wildlife. Boats can be hired at San Rafael for traveling 40-plus kilometers up the Río Frío to the reserve. The area is a birdwatcher's paradise. (52 kilometers northeast of San Rafael via Route 4 to Colonia Puntarenas and Route 138 to Caño Negro)
- Venado Caves: a limestone cave of eight chambers, formed over millennia by a series of underground rivers. Giant spiders, swarms of bats and eyeless fish abound. Visitors must be accompanied by a guide. (25 kilometers southeast of San Rafael via Route 4 to Jicarito and Route 734 to Venado; the caves are located four kilometers south of the village of Venado)
- Tenorio Volcano National Park: just 15 kilometers northwest of San Rafael, this park is host to the "teñideros" where the famous Rio Celeste turns from a crystal-clear river to a magnificent light blue one. The river also cascades into one of Costa Rica's most beautiful waterfalls within the park. The park itself is teeming with lush tropical wildlife that visitors can enjoy during several hours of hiking.
