= Los Chiles =

District in Los Chiles canton, Alajuela province, Costa Rica

- District
- Interactive map of Los Chiles
- Los Chiles district location in Costa Rica
- Coordinates: 10.9639334°N 84.5989939°W
- Country: Costa Rica
- Province: Alajuela
- Canton: Los Chiles

Area
  - Total: 504.21 km^{2} (194.68 sq mi)
- Elevation: 43 m (141 ft)

Population (2011)
  - Total: 13,262
  - Density: 26.303/km^{2} (68.123/sq mi)
- Time zone: UTC−06:00
- Postal code: 21401

Los Chiles is a district of the Los Chiles canton, in the Alajuela province of Costa Rica.

== History ==
Los Chiles was originally settled by fishermen and others who worked on the nearby Río San Juan in Nicaragua. It was granted the title of "ciudad" (city) by a law of May 4, 1970.

During the 1980s, it was a strategic location on an important supply route for the Contras fighting to overthrow the Sandinista government in Nicaragua, and during that time military men from the United States were a common (albeit illegal) sight on the streets on the town.

== Geography ==
Los Chiles has an area of 504.21 km^{2} and an elevation of 43 metres.

It is on the San Carlos Plain (Llanura de San Carlos) in northern Costa Rica, 14 kilometers southeast of San Carlos in Nicaragua, 97 kilometers northwest of Ciudad Quesada, 175 kilometers from the provincial capital city of Alajuela, and 198 kilometers from the national capital city of San Jose.

Los Chiles borders Nicaragua, resulting in a large population of nicaraguan migrants in this district. The border with said country is only 4 kilometers north.

== Demographics ==
Historical population
Census	Pop.	±% p.a.
1963	3,231	—
1973	3,190	−0.13%
1984	5,154	+4.46%
2000	9,900	+4.16%
2011	13,262	+2.69%
2022	20,546	+4.06%
Source: Instituto Nacional de Estadística y Censos; Centro Centroamericano de Población

By the year 2022 Los Chiles had an estimated population of 20 546 inhabitants, and for the 2011 census, Los Chiles had a population of 13,262 inhabitants.

== Transportation ==
=== Road transportation ===
The district is covered by the following road routes:

- National Route 35
- National Route 138
- National Route 760

=== Airports ===
Los Chiles is served by Los Chiles Airport, a grass runway on the east side of town.

== Economy ==
Los Chiles is a "border town," only four kilometers from Nicaragua. The vast majority of the population of the city was born in Nicaragua. The Río Frío, on the western edge of town, is a major thoroughfare used to access small villages and farms in the surrounding area.

The town is also an agriculture and sportfishing center. A gas station is located here, the only one for 20 kilometers in any direction, and a civil guard checkpoint is on Highway 35 south of town. There is a bank and a few basic restaurants and cabinas for lodging.

=== Tourism ===
- Caño Negro Wildlife Refuge: a watery lowland of lush sloughs and marshes, a seasonal lake, and abundant wildlife. Boats can be hired at Los Chiles for traveling the 23 kilometers down the Río Frío to Lake Caño Negro inside the reserve. The area is a birdwatcher's paradise. Tours to Caño Negro from La Fortuna and the Arenal Volcano area come by bus to Los Chiles, where visitors then board canopied boats for the trip down the Río Frío to the reserve. (29 kilometers southwest of Los Chiles via Highway 4 to El Parque, then west to San Emilio, and southwest on Highway 138 to Caño Negro)
- Solentiname Islands: an archipelago in Lake Nicaragua. These islands are home to fishermen, farmers, and many painters and crafters. They are reached from Los Chiles by traveling up the Río Frío to the city of San Carlos in Nicaragua, from where boats journey into the lake to the islands.

== Climate ==
This area typically has a pronounced dry season. According to the Köppen Climate Classification system, Los Chiles has a tropical savanna climate, abbreviated "Aw" on climate maps.

Climate data for Los Chiles (1995–2015)
Month	Jan	Feb	Mar	Apr	May	Jun	Jul	Aug	Sep	Oct	Nov	Dec	Year
Mean daily maximum °C (°F)	29.9 (85.8)	30.9 (87.6)	32.6 (90.7)	33.8 (92.8)	32.9 (91.2)	31.6 (88.9)	30.8 (87.4)	31.5 (88.7)	32.2 (90.0)	31.7 (89.1)	30.5 (86.9)	30.0 (86.0)	31.5 (88.7)
Daily mean °C (°F)	25.4 (77.7)	25.7 (78.3)	26.5 (79.7)	27.6 (81.7)	27.8 (82.0)	27.4 (81.3)	26.9 (80.4)	27.2 (81.0)	27.5 (81.5)	27.3 (81.1)	26.4 (79.5)	25.7 (78.3)	26.8 (80.2)
Mean daily minimum °C (°F)	20.8 (69.4)	20.4 (68.7)	20.4 (68.7)	21.4 (70.5)	22.7 (72.9)	23.2 (73.8)	22.9 (73.2)	23.0 (73.4)	22.9 (73.2)	22.9 (73.2)	22.3 (72.1)	21.5 (70.7)	22.0 (71.6)
Average rainfall mm (inches)	85.5 (3.37)	41.1 (1.62)	29.0 (1.14)	42.4 (1.67)	163.1 (6.42)	222.6 (8.76)	262.0 (10.31)	217.0 (8.54)	194.1 (7.64)	198.3 (7.81)	147.7 (5.81)	117.0 (4.61)	1,719.8 (67.71)
Average rainy days	21	15	12	10	19	24	27	26	24	24	20	22	244
Average relative humidity (%)	87	84	80	79	84	89	90	89	88	89	88	88	86
Source: Instituto Meteorologico Nacional
