= Las Horquetas =

District in Sarapiquí canton, Heredia province, Costa Rica

- District
- Interactive map of Las Horquetas
- Las Horquetas district location in Costa Rica
- Coordinates: 10.3195116°N 83.9647424°W
- Country: Costa Rica
- Province: Heredia
- Canton: Sarapiquí

Area
  - Total: 565.41 km^{2} (218.31 sq mi)
- Elevation: 68 m (223 ft)

Population (2011)
  - Total: 24,331
  - Density: 43.032/km^{2} (111.45/sq mi)
- Time zone: UTC−06:00
- Postal code: 41003

Las Horquetas is a district of the Sarapiquí canton in the Heredia province of Costa Rica.

== Location ==
It is located in the northern region of the country and borders the neighborhoods of Puerto Viejo to the north, Varablanca de Heredia to the south, and La Virgen to the west. It borders with the province of Limón to the east .

Its head, the village of Horquetas, is 16.9 km (16 minutes) to the SE of Puerto Viejo city and 68.5 km (1 hour and 14 minutes) to the NE of San José city, the capital of the nation. Another important and slightly larger village is Rio Frio, which is about 8.5 km to the west (12 minutes).

== Geography ==
Las Horquetas has an area of 565.41 km^{2} (218.31 sq mi) and an elevation of 68 metres.

It presents a mountainous territory in its southwest zone, whereas in direction north and east, the land descends and ends in the plains of Sarapiquí.

== Demographics ==
Historical population
Census	Pop.	±% p.a.
1973	7,236	—
1984	10,351	+3.31%
2000	20,094	+4.23%
2011	24,331	+1.75%
2022	27,950	+1.27%
Source: Instituto Nacional de Estadística y Censos; Centro Centroamericano de Población

For the 2011 census, Las Horquetas had a population of 24,331 inhabitants. It is the most populated of the canton, even ahead of Puerto Viejo and La Virgen.

== Settlements ==
The district's 37 population centers are:

- Horquetas (head of the district)
- Bambuzal
- Cerro Negro (parte)
- Colonia Bambú
- Colonia Colegio
- Colonia Esperanza
- Colonia Huetar
- Colonia Nazareth
- Colonia Victoria
- Colonia Villalobos
- Cubujuquí
- Chiripa
- Fátima
- Finca Agua
- Finca Zona Siete
- Finca Zona Ocho
- Finca Zona Diez
- Finca Zona Once
- Isla
- Isla Grande
- Isla de Israel
- La Conquista
- La Chávez
- Flaminia
- La Vuelta
- Rambla
- Pedernales
- Platanera
- Río Frío (the biggest village)
- San Bernardino
- San Luis
- Santa Clara
- Tapa Viento
- Ticarí
- Tigre
- Villa Isabel
- Villa Nueva

== Economy ==
It plays an important role in the area, the extensive cultivation of bananas and pineapples for export purposes, dominating the landscape and being the main source of income for many of its inhabitants.

Horquetas, his head, and the village of Rio Frio, have health and education services.

Entertainment services are also offered in recreational areas.

Groceries, shoes, clothes, appliances and various accessories are sold.

== Transportation ==
=== Road transportation ===
The district is covered by the following road routes:

- National Route 4
- National Route 229
- National Route 817
