= National Route 138 (Costa Rica) =

National Road Route in Costa Rica

National Secondary Route 138
- Ruta nacional secundaria 138

Route information
- Maintained by Ministry of Public Works and Transport
- Length: 42.985 km (26.710 mi)

Major junctions
- West end: Route 4
- Route 139
- East end: Route 35

Location
- Country: Costa Rica

Highway system
- National Road Network of Costa Rica

National Secondary Route 138, is a road between Route 4 and Route 35, contained in the north plains of the Alajuela province of Costa Rica.

== Description ==
Starting west on Route 4, the road follows a slightly northeast direction towards Route 35. It is the main access route to the Caño Negro Wildlife Refuge. Most of the road is made of gravel, except for an asphalt segment on the west of the road.

== Locations ==
The entire route is in Alajuela province.

Canton	District	km	mi	Destinations	Notes
Upala	Upala			Route 4	
Upala	Yolillal	No major junctions			
Los Chiles	Los Chiles			Route 35	
Los Chiles	Caño Negro			Route 139	

== History ==
In May 2020, the segment between Caño Negro Wildlife Refuge and Route 35 was asphalted for a total of 18.2 km (11.3 mi).
