= List of highways numbered 733 =

The following highways are numbered 733:

== Canada ==
- Highway 733

== Costa Rica ==
- National Route 733

== United States ==
- LA 733
- MD 733
- PR-733
- FM 733

Preceded by 732	Lists of highways 733	Succeeded by 734
