= National Route 817 (Costa Rica) =

National Road Route in Costa Rica

National Tertiary Route 817
- Ruta nacional terciaria 817

Route information
- Maintained by Ministry of Public Works and Transport
- Length: 29.265 km (18.184 mi)

Location
- Country: Costa Rica
- Provinces: Heredia, Limón

Highway system
- National Road Network of Costa Rica
← Route 816	→ Route 901

National Tertiary Route 817, or just Route 817 (Spanish: Ruta Nacional Terciaria 817, or Ruta 817) is a National Road Route of Costa Rica, located in the Heredia, Limón provinces.

== Description ==
In Heredia province the route covers Sarapiquí canton (Puerto Viejo, Horquetas, and Llanuras del Gaspar districts).

In Limón province the route covers Pococí canton (La Rita district).
