= List of highways numbered 732 =

The following highways are numbered 732:

== Canada ==
- Highway 732

== Costa Rica ==
- National Route 732

== United States ==
- SR 732
- MD 732
- SR 732
- FM 732

Preceded by 731	Lists of highways 732	Succeeded by 733
