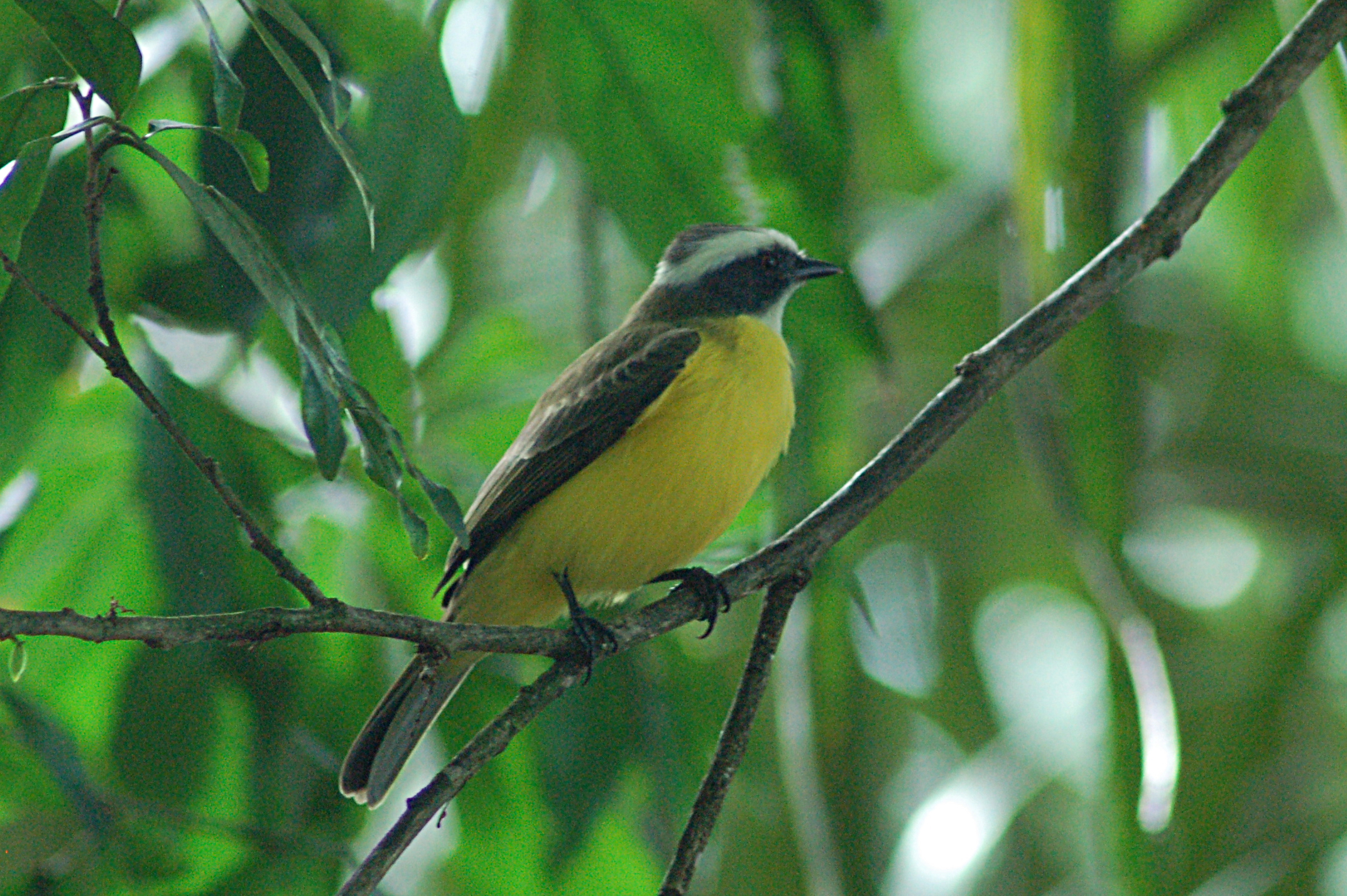

Conservation status
- Least Concern (IUCN 3.1)

Scientific classification
- Kingdom: Animalia
- Phylum: Chordata
- Class: Aves
- Order: Passeriformes
- Family: Tyrannidae
- Genus: Conopias
- Species: C. albovittatus

Binomial name
- Conopias albovittatus (Lawrence, 1862)

Synonyms
- See text

= White-ringed flycatcher =

Species of bird

The white-ringed flycatcher (Conopias albovittatus) is a species of bird in the family Tyrannidae. It is found in Colombia, Costa Rica, Ecuador, Honduras, Nicaragua, and Panama.

== Taxonomy and systematics ==
The white-ringed flycatcher has a complicated taxonomic history. It was originally described as Pitangus albovittatus, grouping it with the great kiskadee (P. sulphuratus). In 1906 genus Coryphotriccus was erected for it. Starting in the 1960s authors began merging this genus into genus Conopias that had been erected in 1860. For a time it bore the binomial C. albovittata but early in the twenty-first century Conopias was recognized as masculine so the specific epithet was changed to albovittatus to match that gender.

The white-ringed flycatcher has two subspecies, the nominate C. a. albovittatus (Lawrence, 1862) and C. a. distinctus (Ridgway, 1908). What is now the yellow-throated flycatcher (C. parvus) was treated as a third subspecies but was separated in the early twenty-first century.

== Description ==
The white-ringed flycatcher is 15 to 16.5 cm (5.9 to 6.5 in) long and weighs about 24 g (0.85 oz). The sexes have the same plumage; females are slightly smaller than males. Adults of the nominate subspecies have a black to dark sooty brownish crown and face with a mostly hidden lemon-yellow to canary-yellow patch in the center of the crown. They have a white supercilium that begins at the forehead, widens behind the eye, and wraps almost all the way around the nape. Their upperparts vary from grayish olive-green to dark olive or olive-brown. Their wings are dusky and browner than the upperparts. The wings have pale grayish brown or olive edges on the coverts, darker grayish brown edges on the primaries, and thin whitish or yellowish white edges on the secondaries and tertials. Their tail is mostly dark grayish brown with lighter gray-brown or olive edges on the feathers. Their chin and throat are white and their underparts are bright canary-yellow. Juveniles have no yellow on the crown and more brownish upperparts than adults, with cinnamon edges on the wing coverts and rump feathers and wider yellowish edges on the tertials. Subspecies C. a. distinctus is larger than the nominate, with more blackish on the sides of the head, more grayish olive upperparts, and paler underparts. Both subspecies have a blackish iris, a longish black bill, and blackish legs and feet.

== Distribution and habitat ==
The white-ringed flycatcher has a disjunct distribution. Subspecies C. a. distinctus is the more northerly of the two. It is found from Olancho and Gracias a Dios departments in eastern Honduras south through eastern Nicaragua and eastern Costa Rica very slightly into western Panama. The nominate subspecies is found from the Panama Canal Zone east into northwestern Colombia and south through western Colombia into northwestern Ecuador as far as northwestern Pichincha and southwestern Imbabura provinces. The white-ringed flycatcher primarily inhabits the canopy and edges of tropical evergreen forest and is occasionally found in taller trees in clearings and more open areas nearby and also along watercourses. In elevation it reaches 750 m (2,500 ft) in Honduras, 500 m (1,600 ft) in Costa Rica, and 1,350 m (4,400 ft) in Panama. In Colombia it occurs below 900 m (3,000 ft) and in Ecuador below 500 m (1,600 ft).

== Behavior ==
=== Movement ===
The white-ringed flycatcher is believed to be a year-round resident but is known to wander somewhat.

=== Feeding ===
The white-ringed flycatcher feeds primarily on insects and spiders and also includes berries in its diet. It typically forages singly, in pairs, or in small family groups and occasionally accompanies mixed-species feeding flocks. It perches high in the canopy, often on the very top of a tree, and captures prey with sallies to snatch it from foliage.

=== Breeding ===
The white-ringed flycatcher's breeding season has not been defined but spans March to June in Costa Rica. It nests in cavities such as old woodpecker or natural holes in trees and also among bromeliads. The clutch is two eggs. The incubation period, time to fledging, and details of parental care are not known.

=== Vocalization ===
The white-ringed flycatcher's call is described as very distinctive. It "commences with a long note, followed by rapid, rattling or whirring, repetitive trill, tre-r-r-r-r, tre-r-r-r-r…, kree-ee-ee-eer". It also makes a "short, slightly nasal and descending wheeerr whistle followed by rattling qua-tre-e-e-e-e-e, wheeereeeeee-e-e-e or wheeeurrrrr-rreek trills" and a "prolonged, relatively higher-pitched, petulant trill that slows and ends with several discrete notes".

== Status ==
The IUCN has assessed the white-ringed flycatcher as being of Least Concern. It has a large range; its population of at least 50,000 mature idividuals is believed to be decreasing. No immediate threats have been identified. It is considered rare to uncommon in Honduras but its status there is not clear. It is fairly common in most of Costa Rica but rare in the far northern Caño Negro area. It is fairly common in Colombia and widespread in Ecuador. It occurs in several protected areas and is "[p]robably tolerant of some forest degradation, as it is found in second growth and in trees in clearings".
