= 734 (disambiguation) =

734 may refer to:

- 734, the year 734 C.E.
- 734 (number)
- Area code 734, which is the area code of parts of southeastern Michigan
- 734 (song), by Juice Wrld, from the album Goodbye & Good Riddance

== See also ==
- List of highways numbered 734
