= National Route 505 (Costa Rica) =

National Road Route in Costa Rica

National Tertiary Route 505
- Ruta nacional terciaria 505

Route information
- Maintained by Ministry of Public Works and Transport
- Length: 19.215 km (11.940 mi)

Location
- Country: Costa Rica
- Provinces: Heredia

Highway system
- National Road Network of Costa Rica
← Route 504	→ Route 506

National Tertiary Route 505, or just Route 505 (Spanish: Ruta Nacional Terciaria 505, or Ruta 505) is a National Road Route of Costa Rica, located in the Heredia province.

== Description ==
In Heredia province the route covers Sarapiquí canton (Puerto Viejo district).
