= Bijagua de Upala =

District in Upala canton, Alajuela province, Costa Rica

Bijagua
- District
- Interactive map of Bijagua
- Bijagua district location in Costa Rica
- Coordinates: 10.7483576°N 85.0386946°W
- Country: Costa Rica
- Province: Alajuela
- Canton: Upala

Area
  - Total: 186.39 km^{2} (71.97 sq mi)
- Elevation: 430 m (1,410 ft)

Population (2011)
  - Total: 4,538
  - Density: 24.35/km^{2} (63.06/sq mi)
- Time zone: UTC−06:00
- Postal code: 21304

Bijagua is the fourth district of the Upala canton in the Alajuela province of Costa Rica.

== Geography ==
Bijagua has an area of 186.39 km^{2} and an elevation of 430 metres.

It is a small town approximately 26 km south of Upala in Northern plains of Costa Rica.

The town is situated in a valley between the Miravalles and Tenorio volcanoes.

== Locations ==
- Towns: Altamira, Carlos Vargas.
- Hamlets: Ángeles, Achiote, Cuesta Pichardo, Chorros, Florecitas, Flores, Higuerón, Jardín, Macho, Pata de Gallo (San Cristóbal) (part), Pueblo Nuevo, Reserva, San Miguel, Santo Domingo, Zapote.

== Economy ==
The local economy is primarily farming, including vegetable production and cattle raising. Tourism exists due in part to the primary growth rainforest located in the area.

Bijagua is approximately 16 km from Tenorio Volcano National Park and the Celeste River.

== Demographics ==
Historical population
Census	Pop.	±% p.a.
1973	1,910	—
1984	2,701	+3.20%
2000	4,042	+2.55%
2011	4,538	+1.06%
2022	5,476	+1.72%
Source: Instituto Nacional de Estadística y Censos; Centro Centroamericano de Población

For the 2011 census, Bijagua had a population of 4,538 inhabitants.

== Transportation ==
=== Road transportation ===
The district is covered by the following road routes:

- National Route 6
