= 731 (disambiguation) =

731 was a common year starting on Monday of the Julian calendar. It may also refer to:

- 731 (number)
- 731 (The X-Files), the tenth episode of the third season of the American science fiction television series The X-Files
- 731 BC, the ninth year of the 730s BC decade
- 731 series, an AC electric multiple unit train type operated by Hokkaido Railway Company
- Area code 731, an area code in the U.S. state of Tennessee
- Battle of Hill 731, a fierce battle fought during World War II in southern Albania
- Unit 731, a covert biological and chemical warfare research and development unit of the Imperial Japanese Army
  - Evil Unbound, also known as 731, a historical drama film about the unit
- March 731, a Formula One racing car

== See also ==
- List of highways numbered 731
