= National Route 4 (Costa Rica) =

Road in Costa Rica

National Primary Route 4
- Ruta nacional primaria 4

Route information
- Maintained by Ministry of Public Works and Transport
- Length: 255 km (158 mi)
- History: Finished August 2017

Major junctions
- West end: Route 1
- Route 6 Route 35; Route 126
- East end: Route 32

Location
- Country: Costa Rica
- Provinces: Alajuela, Heredia, Guanacaste, Limón

Highway system
- National Road Network of Costa Rica
← Route 1	→ Route 5

National Primary Route 4, or Route 4, is a national primary road which covers the northern region of the country through the provinces of Limón, Heredia, Alajuela, and Guanacaste.

The Corredor Noratlántico (North Atlantic Drive) is made from the section between Guápiles and Limón of the Route 32, and this route. It allows direct travel between the Caribbean coast of the country to the northwest canton of La Cruz in Guanacaste Province.

== Description ==
Route 4 covers the north provinces of the country, and allows to travel between the Pacific Ocean districts and the Caribbean side of the country without going through the Greater Metropolitan Area at the central valley.

Together with Route 32, it forms the northwest end of the Corredor Noratlántico (North Atlantic Drive), which allows to traverse the country from the Pacific Ocean to the Caribbean sea.

According to National Laboratory of Materials and Structural Models (LANAMME) at the University of Costa Rica, Route 4 is not safe for the high vehicular traffic expected, and an intervention is required for further safety for pedestrians, cyclists, and inhabitants of the small villages along the road.

In Alajuela province the route covers San Carlos canton (Florencia, Aguas Zarcas, Pital, La Fortuna, La Palmera, Venado, Cutris, and Monterrey districts), Upala canton (Upala, San José o Pizote, Delicias, Dos Ríos, and Yolillal districts), Guatuso canton (San Rafael, Buenavista, and Katira districts), and Río Cuarto canton (Santa Rita district).

In Heredia province the route covers Sarapiquí canton (Puerto Viejo, La Virgen, and Horquetas districts).

In Guanacaste province the route covers La Cruz canton (La Cruz, Santa Cecilia, and Garita districts).

In Limón province the route covers Pococí canton (Guápiles district).

== History ==
=== Road construction from Bajos de Chilamate to Vuelta de Kooper ===
This is a segment planned since 1973, but construction started until 2013 and was opened in August 2017, it directly connects the then two endpoints of Route 4, at Bajos de Chilamate in Heredia province and Vuelta de Kooper in Alajuela province with a road of 27 km, single lane in each direction, and avoids the previous longer journey of 87.32 km which went through Route 126, Route 140, Route 250 and Route 751, and the towns of La Virgen, San Miguel, Venecia and Aguas Zarcas. This last segment finally concludes the construction of the originally planned Route 4.

The new section road includes eight major bridges, five junctions at ground level and five elevated bypasses.

Works were financed by CAF – Development Bank of Latin America and the Caribbean, the central government and municipalities of San Carlos, Grecia, Sarapiquí and the regional North Huetar Special Economic Zone.

Map sketch of the old route (in orange) that connected National Route 4 (red)
