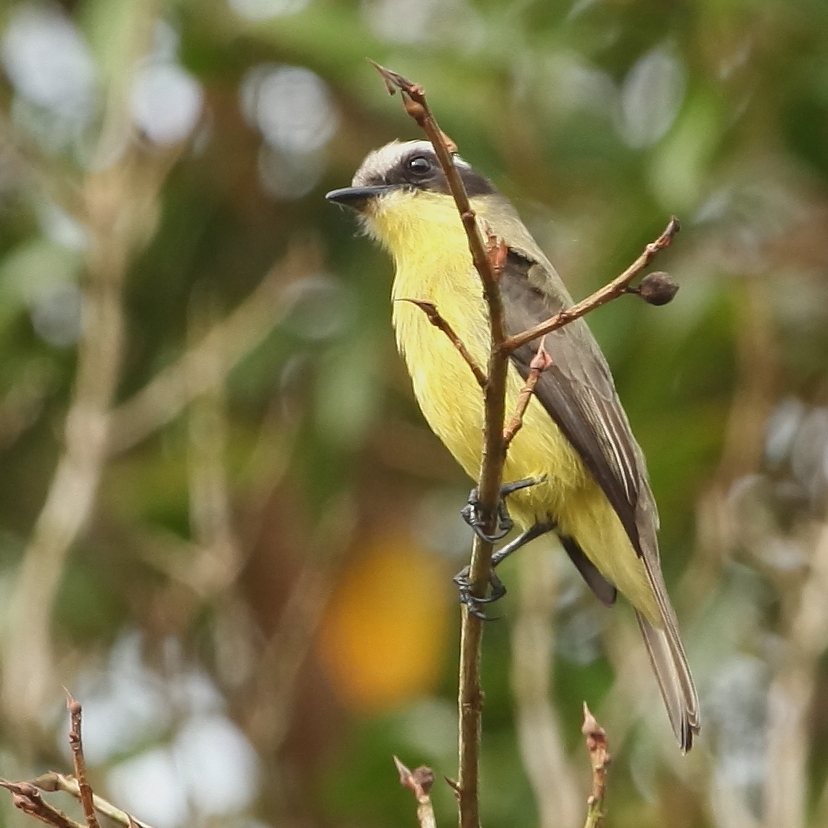
- Three-striped flycatcher (Conopias trivirgatus)

Scientific classification
- Kingdom: Animalia
- Phylum: Chordata
- Class: Aves
- Order: Passeriformes
- Family: Tyrannidae
- Genus: Conopias; Cabanis & Heine, 1860

Type species
- Tyrannula superciliosa Swainson, 1836

= Conopias =

Genus of birds

Conopias is a genus of birds in the tyrant flycatcher family Tyrannidae.

== Species ==
The genus contains the following four species:

| Image | Scientific name | Common name | Distribution |
|---|---|---|---|
| | Conopias albovittatus | White-ringed flycatcher | Central America and Tumbes–Chocó. |
| | Conopias trivirgatus | Three-striped flycatcher | Amazonia and Atlantic Forest. |
| | Conopias parvus | Yellow-throated flycatcher | Amazonia. |
| | Conopias cinchoneti | Lemon-browed flycatcher | northern Andes. |
