= National Route 229 (Costa Rica) =

National Road Route in Costa Rica

National Secondary Route 229
- Ruta nacional secundaria 229

Route information
- Maintained by Ministry of Public Works and Transport
- Length: 20.705 km (12.865 mi)

Location
- Country: Costa Rica
- Provinces: Heredia

Highway system
- National Road Network of Costa Rica
← Route 228	→ Route 230

National Secondary Route 229, or just Route 229 (Spanish: Ruta Nacional Secundaria 229, or Ruta 229) is a National Road Route of Costa Rica, located in the Heredia province.

== Description ==
In Heredia province the route covers Sarapiquí canton (Horquetas district).
