= Dos Ríos District =

District in Upala canton, Alajuela province, Costa Rica

Dos Ríos
- District
- Interactive map of Dos Ríos
- Dos Ríos district location in Costa Rica
- Coordinates: 10.9375426°N 85.3648996°W
- Country: Costa Rica
- Province: Alajuela
- Canton: Upala

Area
  - Total: 218.07 km^{2} (84.20 sq mi)
- Elevation: 500 m (1,600 ft)

Population (2011)
  - Total: 3,194
  - Density: 14.65/km^{2} (37.93/sq mi)
- Time zone: UTC−06:00
- Postal code: 21306

Dos Ríos is a district of the Upala canton, in the Alajuela province of Costa Rica.

== Geography ==
Dos Ríos has an area of 218.07 km^{2} and an elevation of 500 metres.

== Demographics ==
Historical population
Census	Pop.	±% p.a.
1973	1,187	—
1984	1,839	+4.06%
2000	2,776	+2.61%
2011	3,194	+1.28%
2022	4,697	+3.57%
Source: Instituto Nacional de Estadística y Censos; Centro Centroamericano de Población

For the 2011 census, Dos Ríos had a population of 3,194 inhabitants.

== Transportation ==
=== Road transportation ===
The district is covered by the following road routes:

- National Route 4
- National Route 917
