= National Route 510 (Costa Rica) =

National Road Route in Costa Rica

National Tertiary Route 510
- Ruta nacional terciaria 510

Route information
- Maintained by Ministry of Public Works and Transport
- Length: 21.245 km (13.201 mi)

Location
- Country: Costa Rica
- Provinces: Heredia

Highway system
- National Road Network of Costa Rica
| ← Route 507 | → Route 601 |

National Tertiary Route 510, or just Route 510 (Spanish: Ruta Nacional Terciaria 510, or Ruta 510) is a National Road Route of Costa Rica, located in the Heredia province.

== Description ==
In Heredia province the route covers Sarapiquí canton (Puerto Viejo, Llanuras del Gaspar districts).
