= San José District, Upala =

District in Upala canton, Alajuela province, Costa Rica

San José
- District
- San José district
- San José district location in Costa Rica
- Coordinates: 10.9471255°N 85.1890159°W
- Country: Costa Rica
- Province: Alajuela
- Canton: Upala

Area
  - Total: 285.39 km^{2} (110.19 sq mi)
- Elevation: 46 m (151 ft)

Population (2011)
  - Total: 7,352
  - Density: 25.76/km^{2} (66.72/sq mi)
- Time zone: UTC−06:00
- Postal code: 21303

San José, also known as Pizote, is a district of the Upala canton in the Alajuela province of Costa Rica.

== Geography ==
San José has an area of 285.39 km^{2} and an elevation of 46 metres. It is crossed by River Pizote.

== Demographics ==
Historical population
Census	Pop.	±% p.a.
1973	2,940	—
1984	4,819	+4.59%
2000	6,826	+2.20%
2011	7,352	+0.68%
2022	11,094	+3.81%
Source: Instituto Nacional de Estadística y Censos; Centro Centroamericano de Población

For the 2011 census, San José had a population of 7,352 inhabitants.

== Transportation ==
=== Road transportation ===
The district is covered by the following road routes:

- National Route 4
- National Route 170
- National Route 732
- National Route 735

== Economy ==
Many products are harvested in this district, including beans, corn, rice, cattle, squash, taro, yam, cassava and plantains. It also has developed touristic activities.
