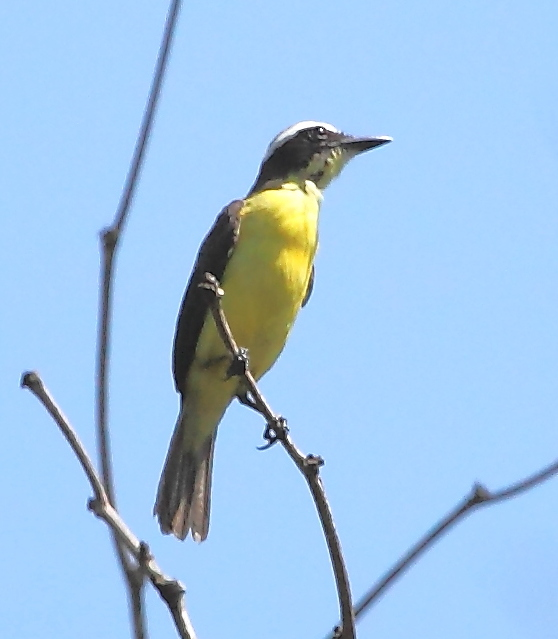
- At Manaus, Amazonas state, Brazil.

Conservation status
- Least Concern (IUCN 3.1)

Scientific classification
- Kingdom: Animalia
- Phylum: Chordata
- Class: Aves
- Order: Passeriformes
- Family: Tyrannidae
- Genus: Conopias
- Species: C. parvus

Binomial name
- Conopias parvus (Pelzeln, 1868)

= Yellow-throated flycatcher =

Species of bird

The yellow-throated flycatcher (Conopias parvus) is a species of bird in the family Tyrannidae, the tyrant flycatchers. It is found in Brazil, Colombia, Ecuador, French Guiana, Guyana, Peru, Suriname, Venezuela, and possibly Bolivia.

== Taxonomy and systematics ==
The yellow-throated flycatcher has a complicated taxonomic history. It was originally described as Pitangus parvus, grouping it with the great kiskadee (P. sulphuratus). For a time it was treated as a subspecies of the white-ringed flycatcher (then Coryphotriccus albovittatus, now Conopias albovittatus). Starting in the 1960s authors began merging genus Coryphotriccus into genus Conopias that had been erected in 1860. In the early twenty-first century the yellow-throated flycatcher was again recognized as a full species.

The yellow-throated flycatcher is monotypic.

== Description ==
The yellow-throated flycatcher is 15 to 16.5 cm (5.9 to 6.5 in) long and weighs about 21 g (0.74 oz). The sexes have the same plumage; females are slightly smaller than males. Adults have a black to dark sooty brownish crown and face with a mostly hidden lemon-yellow to canary-yellow patch in the center of the crown. They have a white supercilium that begins at the forehead, widens behind the eye, and wraps almost all the way around the nape. Their upperparts vary from grayish olive-green to dark olive or olive-brown. Their wings are dusky and browner than the upperparts. The wings have pale grayish brown or olive edges on the coverts, darker grayish brown edges on the primaries, and thin whitish or yellowish white edges on the secondaries and tertials. Their tail is mostly dark grayish brown with lighter gray-brown or olive edges on the feathers. Their chin, throat, and underparts are bright canary-yellow. They have a blackish iris, a longish black bill, and blackish legs and feet.

== Distribution and habitat ==
The yellow-throated flycatcher is found from extreme northeastern Ecuador northeast into southeastern Colombia and east into northeastern and eastern Peru. From there its range extends east through southern and eastern Venezuela and the Guianas and to the Atlantic in Brazil primarily north of the Amazon River. The South American Classification Committee of the American Ornithological Society has at least one unconfirmed record from northern Bolivia and classes the species as hypothetical in that country. The yellow-throated flycatcher inhabits the canopy and edges of humid to wet evergreen forest and mature secondary forest and is occasionally found in taller trees in clearings. In elevation it ranges from sea level to 1,300 m (4,300 ft) in Brazil. In Colombia it reaches only 350 m (1,100 ft), in Ecuador 200 m (700 ft), and in Venezuela 1,300 m (4,300 ft).

== Behavior ==
=== Movement ===
The yellow-throated flycatcher is believed to be a year-round resident but is known to wander somewhat.

=== Feeding ===
The yellow-throated flycatcher feeds primarily on insects and also includes small fruits in its diet. It typically forages in pairs or in small family groups and occasionally joins mixed-species feeding flocks but does not follow them. It perches high in the canopy, often on the very top of a tree, and seldom descends even to the forest mid-level. It captures prey and fruit by gleaning while perched and with sallies to snatch it from foliage while briefly hovering. It occasionally takes insects in mid-air by hawking.

=== Breeding ===
The yellow-throated flycatcher's breeding season is not known. It builds a cup nest in a natural tree hole or woodpecker hole by stuffing it with grass and other fibers. The clutch is two eggs. The incubation period, time to fledging, and details of parental care are not known.

=== Vocalization ===
The yellow-throated flycatcher's call is described as a rather loud "distinctive quick, rhythmic, petulant-sounding, and nearly trilled or ringing quee-le-le, cue-le-le or weedle-de, weedle-de-wee" that is often repeated many times.

== Status ==
The IUCN has assessed the yellow-throated flycatcher as being of Least Concern. It has a large range; its population size is not known and is believed to be decreasing. No immediate threats have been identified. It is considered "at most locally fairly common" in Colombia, "rare and local" in Ecuador, "locally fairly common" in Peru, "uncommon to locally common" in Venezuela, and at best "frequent" in Brazil. It occurs in Brazil's Jaú National Park and is "[p]robably tolerant of some forest degradation, as it occurs also in second growth and in trees in clearings".
