= National Route 917 (Costa Rica) =

National Road Route in Costa Rica

National Tertiary Route 917
- Ruta nacional terciaria 917

Route information
- Maintained by Ministry of Public Works and Transport
- Length: 40.495 km (25.162 mi)

Location
- Country: Costa Rica
- Provinces: Alajuela, Guanacaste

Highway system
- National Road Network of Costa Rica
← Route 915	→ Route 918

National Tertiary Route 917, or just Route 917 (Spanish: Ruta Nacional Terciaria 917, or Ruta 917) is a National Road Route of Costa Rica, located in the Alajuela, Guanacaste provinces.

== Description ==
In Alajuela province the route covers Upala canton (Dos Ríos district).

In Guanacaste province the route covers Liberia canton (Mayorga district).
