= National Route 728 (Costa Rica) =

National Road Route in Costa Rica

National Tertiary Route 728
- Ruta nacional terciaria 728

Route information
- Maintained by Ministry of Public Works and Transport
- Length: 15.120 km (9.395 mi)

Location
- Country: Costa Rica
- Provinces: Alajuela

Highway system
- National Road Network of Costa Rica
← Route 727	→ Route 729

National Tertiary Route 728, or just Route 728 (Spanish: Ruta Nacional Terciaria 728, or Ruta 728) is a National Road Route of Costa Rica located in the Alajuela province.

== Description ==
In Alajuela province the route covers Upala canton (Upala and Delicias districts).
