= National Route 164 (Costa Rica) =

National Road Route in Costa Rica

National Secondary Route 164
- Ruta nacional secundaria 164

Route information
- Maintained by Ministry of Public Works and Transport
- Length: 65.950 km (40.979 mi)

Location
- Country: Costa Rica
- Provinces: Alajuela, Guanacaste

Highway system
- National Road Network of Costa Rica
← Route 163	→ Route 165

National Secondary Route 164, or just Route 164 (Spanish: Ruta Nacional Secundaria 164, or Ruta 164) is a National Road Route of Costa Rica located in the Alajuela and Guanacaste provinces.

== Description ==
In Alajuela province the route covers Upala canton (Upala, Aguas Claras, Delicias, and Canalete districts).

In Guanacaste province the route covers Bagaces canton (Bagaces and Mogote districts).
