= National Route 139 (Costa Rica) =

National Road Route in Costa Rica

National Secondary Route 139
- Ruta nacional secundaria 139

Route information
- Maintained by Ministry of Public Works and Transport
- Length: 21.665 km (13.462 mi)

Location
- Country: Costa Rica
- Provinces: Alajuela

Highway system
- National Road Network of Costa Rica
| ← Route 138 | → Route 140 |

National Secondary Route 139, or just Route 139 (Spanish: Ruta Nacional Secundaria 139, or Ruta 139) is a National Road Route of Costa Rica, located in the Alajuela province.

== Description ==
In Alajuela province the route covers Los Chiles canton (Caño Negro district) and Guatuso canton (Buenavista district).
