= Katira =

District in Guatuso canton, Alajuela province, Costa Rica

- District
- Interactive map of Katira
- Katira district location in Costa Rica
- Coordinates: 10.7471107°N 84.931226°W
- Country: Costa Rica
- Province: Alajuela
- Canton: Guatuso
- Creation: 19 November 2008

Area
  - Total: 114.4 km^{2} (44.2 sq mi)
- Elevation: 160 m (520 ft)

Population (2011)
  - Total: 5,127
  - Density: 44.82/km^{2} (116.1/sq mi)
- Time zone: UTC−06:00
- Postal code: 21504

Katira is a district of the Guatuso canton, in the Alajuela province of Costa Rica.

== History ==
Katira was created on 19 November 2008 by Decreto Ejecutivo 34913-MG.

== Geography ==
Katira has an area of 114.4 km^{2} and an elevation of 160 metres.

== Demographics ==
Historical population
| Census | Pop. | ±% p.a. |
|---|---|---|
| 2011 | 5,127 | — |
| 2022 | 6,507 | +2.19% |
Source: Instituto Nacional de Estadística y Censos; Centro Centroamericano de Población

For the 2011 census, Katira had a population of 5,127 inhabitants.

== Transportation ==
=== Road transportation ===
The district is covered by the following road routes:

- National Route 4
