= List of highways numbered 731 =

The following highways are numbered 731:

== Costa Rica ==
- National Route 731

== United States ==
- SR 731 (former)
- LA 731
- MD 731
- PA 731
- PR-731
- FM 731

Preceded by 730	Lists of highways 731	Succeeded by 732
