= Sarapiquí (canton) =

Canton in Heredia province, Costa Rica

- Canton
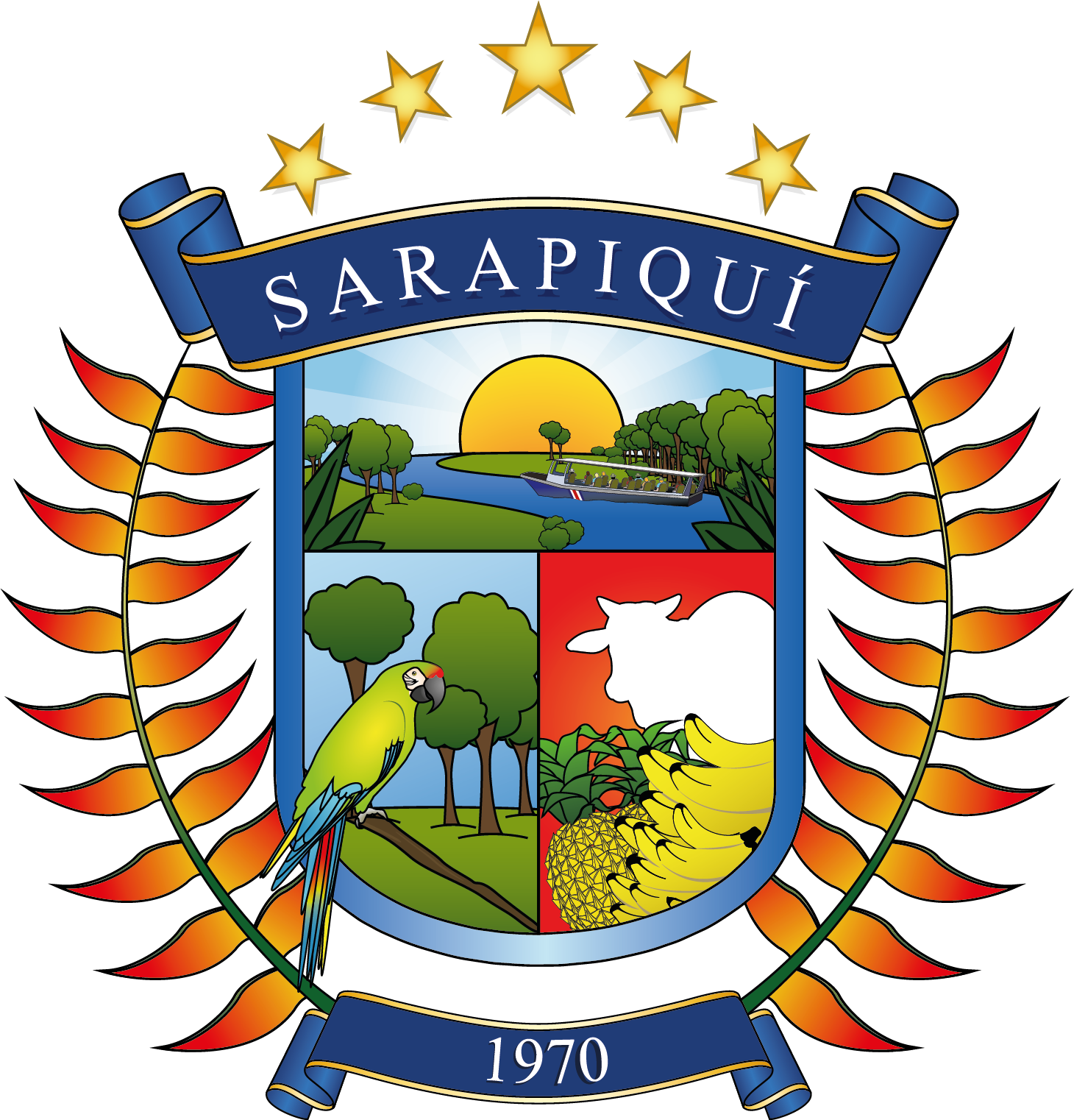
- Flag Seal
- Sarapiquí canton
- Sarapiquí canton location in Costa Rica
- Coordinates: 10.4853128°N 83.9362°W
- Country: Costa Rica
- Province: Heredia

Government
  - Type: Municipality
  - Body: Municipalidad de Sarapiquí

Area
  - Total: 2,140.54 km^{2} (826.47 sq mi)
- Elevation: 68 m (223 ft)

Population (2011)
  - Total: 57,147
  - Density: 26.697/km^{2} (69.146/sq mi)
- Time zone: UTC−06:00
- Canton code: 410
- Website: sarapiqui.go.cr

Sarapiquí is the tenth canton in the province of Heredia in Costa Rica.

== History ==
The canton was established by law on November 18, 1970.

The Sarapiquí River played a very important role in the defense of national sovereignty, because on 10 April 1856, the filibusters under the command of the American William Walker arrived in Costa Rica through the Sarapiquí River, where the battle of Sardinal was fought. This river and region allowed the export of goods to Europe.

== Geography ==
Sarapiquí has an area of 2,140.54 km^{2}.

The canton includes the major portion of the Province of Heredia, and is named for its major waterway, the Sarapiquí River. The western half of the canton gives way to the San Carlos Plain. Heredia's provincial border with Alajuela, which runs through the middle of the San Carlos Plain, marks the canton's western limit. The southern boundary of the canton is established by La Virgen River.

== Economy ==
The main agricultural activities in the region are: banana, pineapple, coffee, corn, cocoa, cardamom, citrus, palm, foliage, ornamental plants, fruit trees, and livestock.

The tourism has had an important development in the last years, thanks to the recreational activities practiced in the Sarapiquí river.

== Demographics ==
Historical population
Census	Pop.	±% p.a.
1973	12,618	—
1984	18,909	+3.75%
2000	45,435	+5.63%
2011	57,147	+2.11%
2022	67,153	+1.48%
Source: Instituto Nacional de Estadística y Censos; Centro Centroamericano de Población

For the 2011 census, Sarapiquí had a population of 57,147 inhabitants.

== Districts ==
The canton of Sarapiqui is divided into five districts:

- Puerto Viejo
- La Virgen
- Horquetas
- Llanuras del Gaspar
- Cureña

== Transportation ==
=== Road transportation ===
The canton is covered by the following road routes:

- National Route 4: For San Carlos, where agricultural crops such as pineapples, palm hearts and ornamental plants are observed.
- National Route 126: The traditional route or route of the heroes (Vara Blanca), where you can see the San Fernando and La Paz waterfalls, mountains, rivers and volcanoes, next to the Sarapiquí river canyon.
- National Route 229
- National Route 505
- National Route 506
- National Route 507
- National Route 510
- National Route 745
- National Route 817
