= National Route 507 (Costa Rica) =

National Road Route in Costa Rica

National Tertiary Route 507
- Ruta nacional terciaria 507

Route information
- Maintained by Ministry of Public Works and Transport
- Length: 63.950 km (39.737 mi)

Location
- Country: Costa Rica
- Provinces: Heredia, Limón

Highway system
- National Road Network of Costa Rica
← Route 506	→ Route 510

National Tertiary Route 507, or just Route 507 (Spanish: Ruta Nacional Terciaria 507, or Ruta 507) is a National Road Route of Costa Rica, located in the Heredia, Limón provinces.

== Description ==
In Heredia province the route covers Sarapiquí canton (Puerto Viejo, Llanuras del Gaspar districts).

In Limón province the route covers Pococí canton (Colorado district).
