= National Route 735 (Costa Rica) =

National Road Route in Costa Rica

National Tertiary Route 735
- Ruta nacional terciaria 735

Route information
- Maintained by Ministry of Public Works and Transport
- Length: 10.990 km (6.829 mi)

Location
- Country: Costa Rica
- Provinces: Alajuela

Highway system
- National Road Network of Costa Rica
← Route 734	→ Route 737

National Tertiary Route 735, or just Route 735 (Spanish: Ruta Nacional Terciaria 735, or Ruta 735) is a National Road Route of Costa Rica, located in the Alajuela province.

== Description ==
In Alajuela province the route covers Upala canton (San José district).
