= National Route 143 (Costa Rica) =

National Road Route in Costa Rica

National Secondary Route 143
- Ruta nacional secundaria 143

Route information
- Maintained by Ministry of Public Works and Transport
- Length: 20.145 km (12.518 mi)

Location
- Country: Costa Rica
- Provinces: Alajuela, Guanacaste

Highway system
- National Road Network of Costa Rica
← Route 142	→ Route 144

National Secondary Route 143, or just Route 143 (Spanish: Ruta Nacional Secundaria 143, or Ruta 143) is a National Road Route of Costa Rica located in the Alajuela and Guanacaste provinces.

== Description ==
In Alajuela province the route covers Guatuso canton (San Rafael and Cote districts).

In Guanacaste province the route covers Tilarán canton (Arenal district).
