= Aguas Claras District =

District in Upala canton, Alajuela province, Costa Rica

Aguas Claras
- District
- Interactive map of Aguas Claras
- Aguas Claras district location in Costa Rica
- Coordinates: 10.8650127°N 85.2397811°W
- Country: Costa Rica
- Province: Alajuela
- Canton: Upala

Area
  - Total: 408.93 km^{2} (157.89 sq mi)
- Elevation: 375 m (1,230 ft)

Population (2011)
  - Total: 4,939
  - Density: 12.08/km^{2} (31.28/sq mi)
- Time zone: UTC−06:00
- Postal code: 21302

Aguas Claras is a district of the Upala canton in the Alajuela province of Costa Rica.

== Geography ==
Aguas Claras has an area of 408.93 km^{2} and an elevation of 375 metres.

== Demographics ==
Historical population
Census	Pop.	±% p.a.
1973	2,713	—
1984	4,426	+4.55%
2000	5,026	+0.80%
2011	4,939	−0.16%
2022	5,648	+1.23%
Source: Instituto Nacional de Estadística y Censos; Centro Centroamericano de Población

For the 2011 census, Aguas Claras had a population of 4,939 inhabitants.

== Transportation ==
=== Road transportation ===
The district is covered by the following road routes:

- National Route 164
- National Route 732
- National Route 737
