= National Route 506 (Costa Rica) =

National Road Route in Costa Rica

National Tertiary Route 506
- Ruta nacional terciaria 506

Route information
- Maintained by Ministry of Public Works and Transport
- Length: 5.935 km (3.688 mi)

Location
- Country: Costa Rica
- Provinces: Heredia

Highway system
- National Road Network of Costa Rica
← Route 505	→ Route 507

National Tertiary Route 506, or just Route 506 (Spanish: Ruta Nacional Terciaria 506, or Ruta 506) is a National Road Route of Costa Rica, located in the Heredia province.

== Description ==
In Heredia province the route covers Sarapiquí canton (La Virgen district).
