= Delicias District =

District in Upala canton, Alajuela province, Costa Rica

Delicias
- District
- Interactive map of Delicias
- Delicias district location in Costa Rica
- Coordinates: 10.9568814°N 85.0541601°W
- Country: Costa Rica
- Province: Alajuela
- Canton: Upala

Area
  - Total: 98.57 km^{2} (38.06 sq mi)
- Elevation: 30 m (98 ft)

Population (2011)
  - Total: 4,483
  - Density: 45.48/km^{2} (117.8/sq mi)
- Time zone: UTC−06:00
- Postal code: 21305

Delicias is a district of the Upala canton in the Alajuela province of Costa Rica.

== Geography ==
Delicias has an area of 98.57 km^{2} and an elevation of 30 metres.

== Demographics ==
Historical population
Census	Pop.	±% p.a.
1973	1,729	—
1984	2,540	+3.56%
2000	3,618	+2.24%
2011	4,483	+1.97%
2022	7,071	+4.23%
Source: Instituto Nacional de Estadística y Censos; Centro Centroamericano de Población

For the 2011 census, Delicias had a population of 4,483 inhabitants.

== Transportation ==
=== Road transportation ===
The district is covered by the following road routes:

- National Route 4
- National Route 164
- National Route 728
