= Yolillal =

District in Upala canton, Alajuela province, Costa Rica

- District
- Yolillal district
- Yolillal district location in Costa Rica
- Coordinates: 10.8995789°N 84.9389329°W
- Country: Costa Rica
- Province: Alajuela
- Canton: Upala
- Creation: 26 November 1980

Area
  - Total: 139.54 km^{2} (53.88 sq mi)
- Elevation: 39 m (128 ft)

Population (2011)
  - Total: 3,308
  - Density: 23.71/km^{2} (61.40/sq mi)
- Time zone: UTC−06:00
- Postal code: 21307

Yolillal is a district of the Upala canton in the Alajuela province of Costa Rica.

== Toponymy ==
The name means a place with an abundant yollillo, a plant.

== History ==
Yolillal was created on 26 November 1980 by Decreto Ejecutivo 12092-G.

== Geography ==
Yolillal has an area of 139.54 km^{2} and an elevation of 39 metres.

== Demographics ==
Historical population
Census	Pop.	±% p.a.
1984	2,728	—
2000	3,019	+0.64%
2011	3,308	+0.83%
2022	4,145	+2.07%
Source: Instituto Nacional de Estadística y Censos; Centro Centroamericano de Población

For the 2011 census, Yolillal had a population of 3,308 inhabitants.

== Transportation ==
=== Road transportation ===
The district is covered by the following road routes:

- National Route 4
- National Route 138
- National Route 731
