= Llanuras del Gaspar =

District in Sarapiquí canton, Heredia province, Costa Rica

- District
- Interactive map of Llanuras del Gaspar
- Llanuras del Gaspar district location in Costa Rica
- Coordinates: 10.6760636°N 83.8270701°W
- Country: Costa Rica
- Province: Heredia
- Canton: Sarapiquí
- Creation: 6 October 1999

Area
  - Total: 267.74 km^{2} (103.37 sq mi)
- Elevation: 20 m (66 ft)

Population (2011)
  - Total: 1,160
  - Density: 4.33/km^{2} (11.2/sq mi)
- Time zone: UTC−06:00
- Postal code: 41004

Llanuras del Gaspar is a district of the Sarapiquí canton, in the Heredia province of Costa Rica.

== History ==
Llanuras del Gaspar was created on 6 October 1999 by Decreto Ejecutivo 28137-G.

== Location ==
It is located in the northern region of the country and borders the district of Puerto Viejo to the south and west, with the province of Limón to the east and Nicaragua to the north. Its head, the village of La Aldea, is located 40 km (18 minutes) NE of Puerto Viejo and 122 km (2 hours 59 minutes) to the NE of San José the capital of the nation.

== Geography ==
Llanuras del Gaspar has an area of 267.74 km^{2} (103.37 sq mi) and an elevation of 20 metres. It is the smallest district of the canton by surface.

It presents a plain territory by dominated by the plains of Sarapiquí.

== Demography ==
The district has 1,160 inhabitants, making it the third-most populous of the canton.

== Demographics ==
Historical population
Census	Pop.	±% p.a.
2000	662	—
2011	1,160	+5.23%
2022	1,355	+1.42%
Source: Instituto Nacional de Estadística y Censos; Centro Centroamericano de Población

For the 2011 census, Llanuras del Gaspar had a population of 1,160 inhabitants.

== Settlements ==
The 9 centers of population of the district son:

- La Aldea (head of the district)
- Caño San Luis
- Chimurria
- Chirriposito
- Delta Costa Rica
- Gaspar
- Lagunilla
- La Lucha
- Tigra (Fátima)

== Economy ==
As in its neighboring district of Cureña, agriculture (banana, pineapple, yucca and plantain) is the basis of the local economy.

La Aldea, its head, has education and health services, is the last thanks to the presence of an BTIHC (Basic Team for Integral Health Care) or EBAIS, for its acronym in Spanish.

== Transportation ==
=== Road transportation ===
The district is covered by the following road routes:

- National Route 507
- National Route 510
- National Route 817
