= Los Chiles Airport =

- IATA: LSL; ICAO: MRLC

Summary
- Airport type: Public
- Serves: Los Chiles, Costa Rica
- Elevation AMSL: 131 ft / 40 m
- Coordinates: 11°02′05″N 84°42′25″W

Map
- Location in Costa Rica

Runways
| Direction | Length | | Surface |
| Direction | m | ft | Surface |
|---|---|---|---|
| 06/24 | 1,305 | 4,282 | Asphalt |
- Sources: Google Maps GCM SkyVector

Los Chiles Airport (IATA: LSL, ICAO: MRLC) is an airport serving the town of Los Chiles in Alajuela Province, Costa Rica. The runway is on the east side of the town, and is 3 kilometres (2 mi) southeast of the Nicaraguan border.

The Liberia VOR-DME (Ident: LIB) is located 56.2 nautical miles (104 km) west-southwest of the airport. The Los Chiles non-directional beacon (Ident: CHI) is located on the field.

== See also ==
- Transport in Costa Rica
- List of airports in Costa Rica
