= Canalete District =

District in Upala canton, Alajuela province, Costa Rica

Canalete
- District
- Interactive map of Canalete
- Canalete district location in Costa Rica
- Coordinates: 10.8300314°N 85.0589991°W
- Country: Costa Rica
- Province: Alajuela
- Canton: Upala
- Creation: 3 August 2012

Area
  - Total: 106.45 km^{2} (41.10 sq mi)
- Elevation: 87 m (285 ft)
- Time zone: UTC−06:00
- Postal code: 21308

Canalete is a district of the Upala canton, in the Alajuela province of Costa Rica.

== History ==
Canalete was created on 3 August 2012 by Acuerdo Ejecutivo N° 35-2012-MGP.

== Geography ==
Canalete has an area of 106.45 km^{2} (41.10 sq mi) and an elevation of 87 metres.

== Demographics ==
Historical population
Census	Pop.	±% p.a.
2022	5,076	—
Source: Instituto Nacional de Estadística y Censos; Centro Centroamericano de Población

For the 2011 census, Canalete had not been created, therefore no population data is available until the next census in 2021.

== Transportation ==
=== Road transportation ===
The district is covered by the following road routes:

- National Route 6
- National Route 164
- National Route 729
- National Route 730
