= El Amparo District =

District in Los Chiles canton, Alajuela province, Costa Rica

El Amparo
- District
- Interactive map of El Amparo
- El Amparo district location in Costa Rica
- Coordinates: 10.8355152°N 84.6574499°W
- Country: Costa Rica
- Province: Alajuela
- Canton: Los Chiles

Area
  - Total: 313.29 km^{2} (120.96 sq mi)
- Elevation: 44 m (144 ft)

Population (2011)
  - Total: 5,992
  - Density: 19.13/km^{2} (49.54/sq mi)
- Time zone: UTC−06:00
- Postal code: 21403

El Amparo is a district of the Los Chiles canton, in the Alajuela province of Costa Rica.

== Geography ==
El Amparo has an area of 313.29 km^{2} and an elevation of 44 metres.

== Demographics ==
Historical population
Census	Pop.	±% p.a.
1973	879	—
1984	2,509	+10.00%
2000	5,390	+4.90%
2011	5,992	+0.97%
2022	7,841	+2.48%
Source: Instituto Nacional de Estadística y Censos; Centro Centroamericano de Población

For the 2011 census, El Amparo had a population of 5,992 inhabitants.

== Transportation ==
=== Road transportation ===
The district is covered by the following road routes:

- National Route 35
