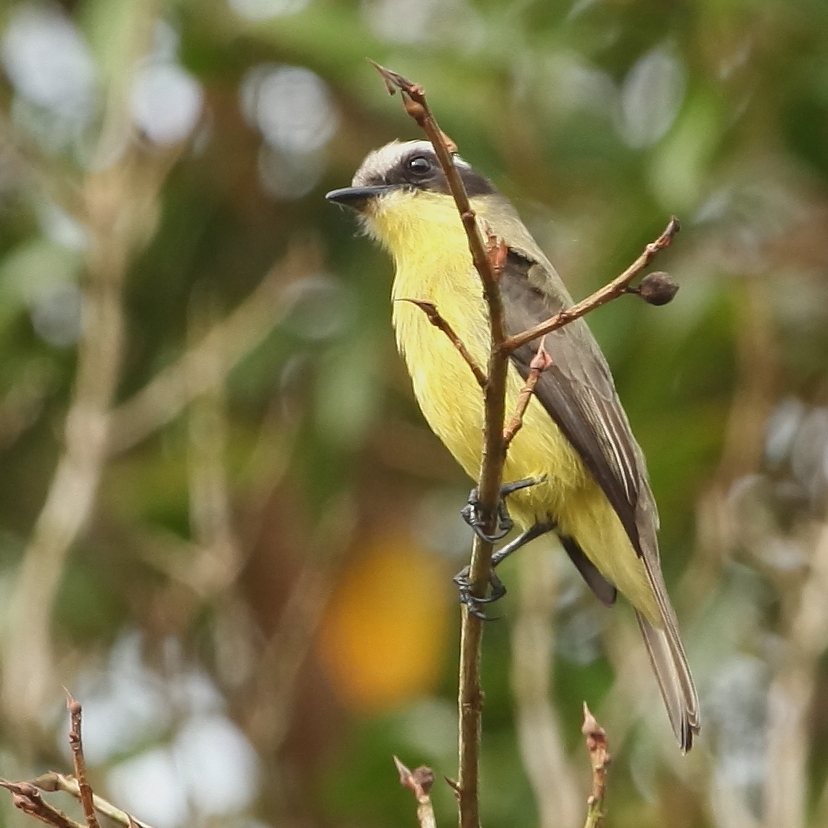
- At Peruíbe, São Paulo State, Brazil

Conservation status
- Least Concern (IUCN 3.1)

Scientific classification
- Kingdom: Animalia
- Phylum: Chordata
- Class: Aves
- Order: Passeriformes
- Family: Tyrannidae
- Genus: Conopias
- Species: C. trivirgatus

Binomial name
- Conopias trivirgatus (Wied, 1831)

= Three-striped flycatcher =

Species of bird

The three-striped flycatcher (Conopias trivirgatus) is a species of bird in the family Tyrannidae, the tyrant flycatchers. It is found in Argentina, Bolivia, Brazil, Ecuador, Paraguay, Peru, and Venezuela.

== Taxonomy and systematics ==
The three-striped flycatcher was originally described as Muscicapa trivirgata, mistakenly placing it in the Old World flycatcher family. It was later moved into genus Conopias that had been erected in 1860. Early in the twenty-first century Conopias was recognized as masculine so the specific epithet was changed to trivirgatus to match that gender.

The three-striped flycatcher has two subspecies, the nominate C t. trivirgatus (Wied, 1831) and C. t. berlepschi (Snethlage, E, 1914). At least one author has suggested that C. t. berlepschi might be a separate species.

== Description ==
The three-striped flycatcher is the smallest member of genus Conopias. It is 13.5 to 14.5 cm (5.3 to 5.7 in) long. The sexes have the same plumage. Adults of the nominate subspecies C t. trivirgatus have a dusky brown crown and face with a white supercilium that begins at the lores and wraps all the way around the nape. Their upperparts are pale olive. Their wings are dusky with faint paler tips the coverts and paler edges on the tertials. Their tail is dusky. Their chin, throat, and underparts are bright lemon-yellow with a faint olive tinge on the breast. Subspecies C. t. berlepschi is smaller than the nominate, with a less blackish crown, paler and more yellowish green upperparts with greenish tips on the tail coverts, wider yellowish gray tips on the wing coverts, no olive tinge on the breast, and a thinner bill. Both subspecies have a dark iris, a long thin blackish bill, and blackish legs and feet.

== Distribution and habitat ==
The three-striped flycatcher has a disjunct distribution. Subspecies C. t. berlepschi is the more northwesterly of the two. Its largest contiguous range is along both banks of the Amazon River across most of Brazil. It also is found in Venezuela's southern Bolívar state, in far northeastern Ecuador, at scattered locations in eastern Peru, and in north central Bolivia's Cochabamba Department. The nominate subspecies ranges from southeastern Bahia in eastern Brazil south to northern Santa Catarina state and west into eastern Paraguay and northeastern Argentina's Misiones Province. The species inhabits the canopy and edges of humid forest, primarily várzea. In elevation it ranges from sea level to 300 m (1,000 ft) in Brazil. It reaches 200 m (700 ft) in Ecuador and 950 m (3,100 ft) in Venezuela.

== Behavior ==
=== Movement ===
The three-striped flycatcher is believed to be a year-round resident but appears to wander somewhat.

=== Feeding ===
The three-striped flycatcher feeds on insects. It typically forages in pairs or in small family groups and regularly joins mixed-species feeding flocks. It perches high in the canopy, often on the top of a tree, and seldom descends even to the forest mid-level. It captures most prey in mid-air by hawking and also makes short sallies to snatch it from vegetation.

=== Breeding ===
The three-striped flycatcher's breeding season is not known but includes November in Argentina. It builds a nest in a natural tree hole or woodpecker hole. Nothing else is known about the species' breeding biology.

=== Vocalization ===
The three-striped flycatcher has several calls. The most often heard is "an abrasive and jarring jew or jeeuw, swiftly and frantically repeated". In Peru it makes "a rather thick-sounding and low-pitched chu-burr" that is repeated by a pair several times as a duet. In Brazil it makes an "irregular series of chew-chew-... notes".

== Status ==
The IUCN has assessed the three-striped flycatcher as being of Least Concern. It has a large range; its population size is not known and is believed to be decreasing. No immediate threats have been identified. It is considered "rare and local" in Ecuador and is known from only two records in Venezuela. In Peru its status is very poorly known. It occurs in several national parks and has a "large range in which much of its habitat is still in good condition".
