= Upala (canton) =

Canton in Alajuela province, Costa Rica

- Canton
- Flag
- Upala canton
- Upala canton location in Alajuela Province Upala canton location in Costa Rica
- Coordinates: 10.8684512°N 85.1637293°W
- Country: Costa Rica
- Province: Alajuela
- Creation: 17 March 1970
- Head city: Upala
- Districts: Districts: Upala; Aguas Claras; San José; Bijagua; Delicias; Dos Ríos; Yolillal; Canalete

Government
  - Type: Municipality
  - Body: Municipalidad de Upala

Area
  - Total: 1,580.67 km^{2} (610.30 sq mi)
- Elevation: 194 m (636 ft)

Population (2011)
  - Total: 43,953
  - Density: 27.807/km^{2} (72.019/sq mi)
- Time zone: UTC−06:00
- Canton code: 213
- Website: {{URL|example.com|optional display text}}

Upala is a canton in the Alajuela province of Costa Rica. The head city is in Upala district.

== History ==
Upala was created on 17 March 1970 by decree 4541.

== Geography ==
Upala has an area of 1,580.67 km^{2} and a mean elevation of 194 metres.

Upala Canton is bordered by Nicaragua on the north, the Las Haciendas River on the northwest, Rito River on the southeast, and the Cordillera de Guanacaste on the south. The Rincón de la Vieja, Santa María, Miravalles, and Tenorio volcanoes are landmarks along the southern border.

== Districts ==
The canton of Upala is subdivided into the following districts:

1. Upala
2. Aguas Claras
3. San José
4. Bijagua
5. Delicias
6. Dos Ríos
7. Yolillal
8. Canalete

== Demographics ==
Historical population
Census	Pop.	±% p.a.
1973	15,971	—
1984	26,061	+4.55%
2000	37,679	+2.33%
2011	43,953	+1.41%
2022	57,361	+2.45%
Source: Instituto Nacional de Estadística y Censos; Centro Centroamericano de Población

For the 2011 census, Upala had a population of 43,953.

== Transportation ==
=== Road transportation ===
The canton is covered by the following road routes:

- National Route 4
- National Route 6
- National Route 138
- National Route 164
- National Route 170
- National Route 728
- National Route 729
- National Route 730
- National Route 731
- National Route 732
- National Route 735
- National Route 737
- National Route 917
