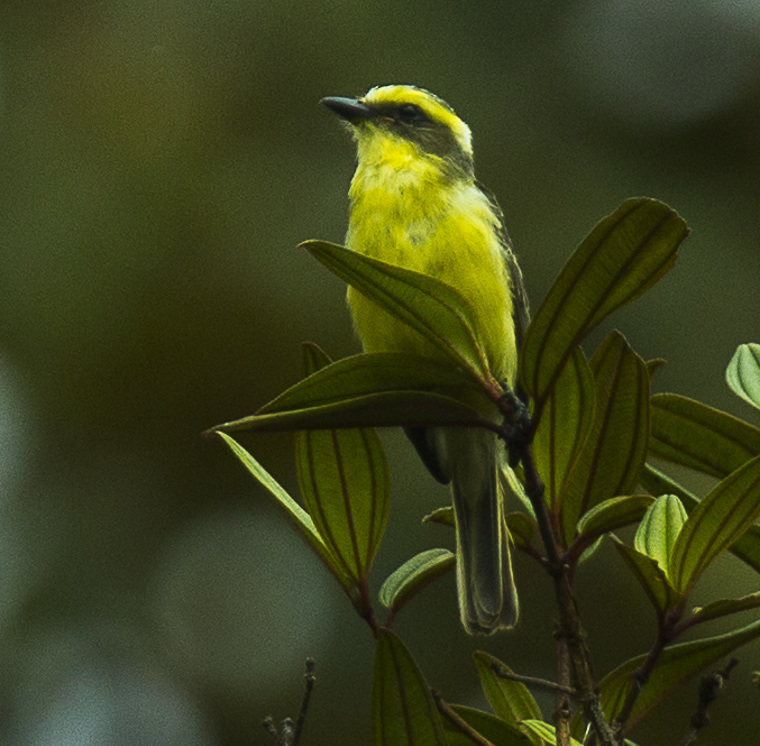

Conservation status
- Least Concern (IUCN 3.1)

Scientific classification
- Kingdom: Animalia
- Phylum: Chordata
- Class: Aves
- Order: Passeriformes
- Family: Tyrannidae
- Genus: Conopias
- Species: C. cinchoneti

Binomial name
- Conopias cinchoneti (Tschudi, 1844)

= Lemon-browed flycatcher =

Species of bird

The lemon-browed flycatcher (Conopias cinchoneti) is a species of bird in the family Tyrannidae, the tyrant flycatchers. It is found in Colombia, Ecuador, Peru, Venezuela, and possibly Bolivia.

== Taxonomy and systematics ==
The lemon-browed flycatcher was originally described as Tyrannus Cinchoneti[sic], placing it with the kingbirds. It was later moved into genus Conopias that had been erected in 1860.

The lemon-browed flycatcher has two subspecies, the nominate C. c. cinchoneti (Tschudi, 1844) and C. c. icterophrys (Lafresnaye, 1845).

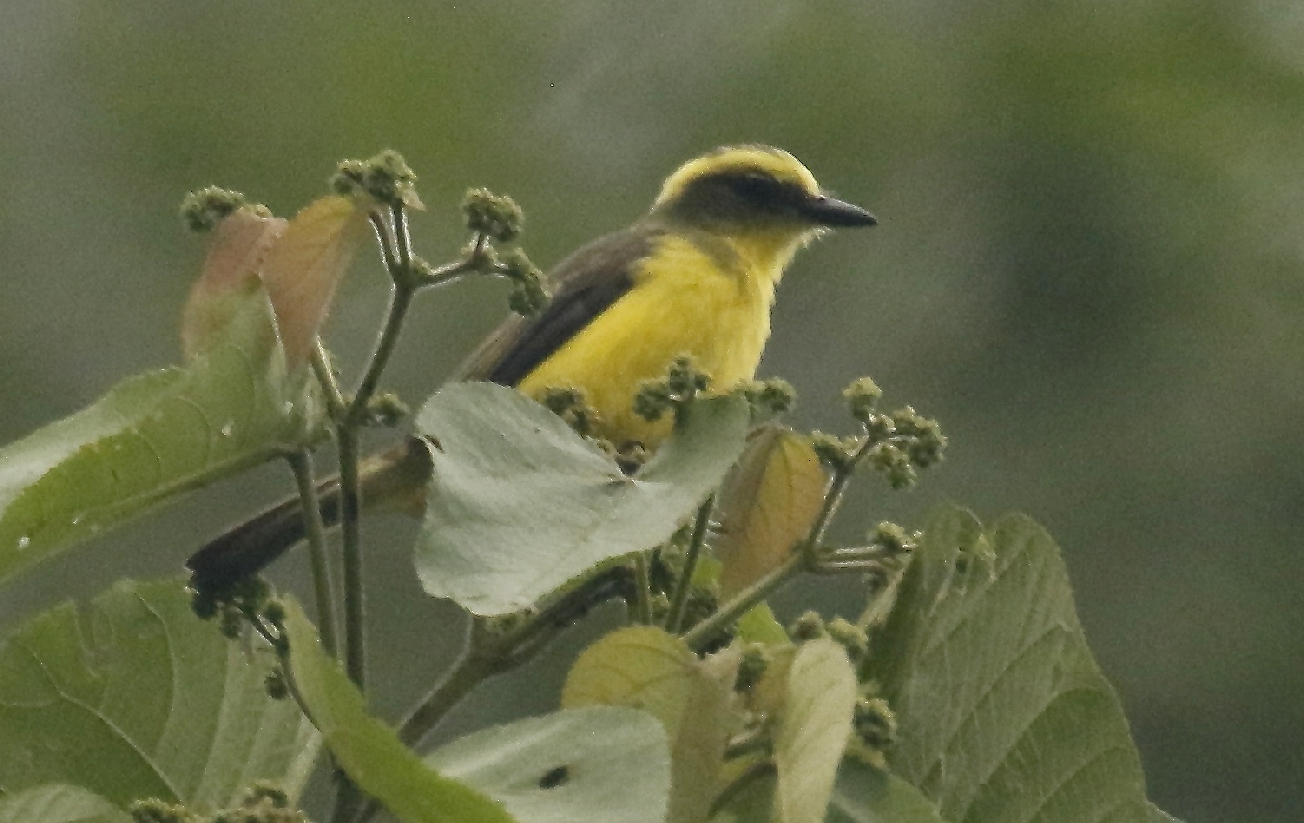
At Wildsumaco Lodge, Ecuador

== Description ==
The lemon-browed flycatcher is 15.5 to 16 cm (6.1 to 6.3 in) long. The sexes have the same plumage. Adults of the nominate subspecies have an olive-green crown and face with a bright grayish yellow forehead and a wide pale yellow supercilium that wraps almost all the way around the nape. Their upperparts are dark olive. Their wings are dusky brownish with paler edges on the tertials. Their tail is dusky brownish. Their chin, throat, and underparts are bright yellow with an olive tinge on the sides of the breast. Subspecies C. c. icterophrys is very similar to the nominate, with perhaps less yellow on the forehead, a thinner supercilium, and a paler throat. Both subspecies have a dark iris, a longish black bill, and blackish legs and feet.

== Distribution and habitat ==
The lemon-browed flycatcher has a highly disjunct distribution. The differences between the subspecies are slight and ill-defined and their geographical limits "may require revision". Subspecies C. c. icterophrys is the more northerly of the two. As currently understood, it is found in the Serranía del Perijá on the Colombia-Venezuela border, in the western Venezuelan Andes in Mérida and Trujillo states, spottily in all three ranges of the Colombian Andes, and in extreme northern Ecuador's Carchi Province. The nominate subspecies is found along the eastern slope of the Andes for almost the length of Ecuador and through northern and central Peru to northern Aycucho and Cuzo departments. Unconfirmed sight records in Bolivia lead the South American Classification Committee of the American Ornithological Society to classify it as hypothetical in that country.

The lemon-browed flycatcher inhabits a variety of semi-open landscapes. These include small forest clearings, larger openings in forest that have some tall trees, and the edges of cloudforest. In Venezuela it ranges between 950 and 2,150 m (3,100 and 7,100 ft) with sight records as low as 450 m (1,500 ft). In Colombia it is found between 900 and 2,000 m (3,000 and 6,600 ft), in Ecuador mostly between 1,000 and 2,000 m (3,300 and 6,600 ft), and in Peru between 800 and 1,950 m (2,600 and 6,400 ft).

== Behavior ==
=== Movement ===
The lemon-browed flycatcher is believed to be a year-round resident but is known to wander somewhat.

=== Feeding ===
The lemon-browed flycatcher feeds on insects and small fruits. It typically forages in pairs or in small family groups and occasionally joins mixed-species feeding flocks. It perches in the open high in the canopy, often on the top of a tree. It captures most prey with short sallies to a new perch to glean it from vegetation and less often during a brief hover.

=== Breeding ===
The few known lemon-browed flycatcher nests were built in old oropendola or cacique nests. Nothing else is known about the species' breeding biology.

=== Vocalization ===
The lemon-browed flycatcher's call is distinctive, "an odd high-pitched nasal, twittering and petulant-sounding whee-ee-ee-ee, wheedidididídí-dí or pa'treeer-pa'treeer-pa'treeer".

== Status ==
The IUCN originally in 1988 assessed the lemon-browed flycatcher as being of Least Concern. In 2012 it was reassessed as Vulnerable and in 2023 returned to being of Least Concern. It has a large range; its population size is not known and is believed to be stable. "The species' tolerance of clearings, edges and degraded habitat suggest that it is not impacted by the current slow range of habitat loss through deforestation for agricultural expansion...[h]owever it is found in association with cloud forest and it is likely that conversion and degradation of forest habitat beyond a certain point will affect the population." It is considered "notably local" in Venezuela, fairly common but more local in the north in Colombia, and uncommon in Ecuador and Peru.
