= National Route 737 (Costa Rica) =

National Road Route in Costa Rica

National Tertiary Route 737
- Ruta nacional terciaria 737

Route information
- Maintained by Ministry of Public Works and Transport
- Length: 13.525 km (8.404 mi)

Location
- Country: Costa Rica
- Provinces: Alajuela

Highway system
- National Road Network of Costa Rica
| ← Route 735 | → Route 738 |

National Tertiary Route 737, or just Route 737 (Spanish: Ruta Nacional Terciaria 737, or Ruta 737) is a National Road Route of Costa Rica, located in the Alajuela province.

== Description ==
In Alajuela province the route covers Upala canton (Aguas Claras district).
