= National Route 729 (Costa Rica) =

National Road Route in Costa Rica

National Tertiary Route 729
- Ruta nacional terciaria 729

Route information
- Maintained by Ministry of Public Works and Transport
- Length: 4.140 km (2.572 mi)

Location
- Country: Costa Rica
- Provinces: Alajuela

Highway system
- National Road Network of Costa Rica
← Route 728	→ Route 730

National Tertiary Route 729, or just Route 729 (Spanish: Ruta Nacional Terciaria 729, or Ruta 729) is a National Road Route of Costa Rica located in the Alajuela province.

== Description ==
In Alajuela province the route covers Upala canton (Upala and Canalete districts).
