= National Route 918 (Costa Rica) =

National Road Route in Costa Rica

National Tertiary Route 918
- Ruta nacional terciaria 918

Route information
- Maintained by Ministry of Public Works and Transport
- Length: 22.370 km (13.900 mi)

Location
- Country: Costa Rica
- Provinces: Guanacaste

Highway system
- National Road Network of Costa Rica
← Route 917	→ Route 920

National Tertiary Route 918, or just Route 918 (Spanish: Ruta Nacional Terciaria 918, or Ruta 918) is a National Road Route of Costa Rica, located in the Guanacaste province.

== Description ==
In Guanacaste province the route covers Liberia canton (Liberia district).
