= National Route 730 (Costa Rica) =

National Road Route in Costa Rica

National Tertiary Route 730
- Ruta nacional terciaria 730

Route information
- Maintained by Ministry of Public Works and Transport
- Length: 6.645 km (4.129 mi)

Location
- Country: Costa Rica
- Provinces: Alajuela

Highway system
- National Road Network of Costa Rica
← Route 729	→ Route 731

National Tertiary Route 730, or just Route 730 (Spanish: Ruta Nacional Terciaria 730, or Ruta 730) is a National Road Route of Costa Rica located in the Alajuela province.

== Description ==
In Alajuela province the route covers Upala canton (Upala and Canalete districts).
