= Cote District =

District in Guatuso canton, Alajuela province, Costa Rica

Cote
- District
- Interactive map of Cote
- Cote district location in Costa Rica
- Coordinates: 10.6177182°N 84.91345°W
- Country: Costa Rica
- Province: Alajuela
- Canton: Guatuso

Area
  - Total: 183.94 km^{2} (71.02 sq mi)
- Elevation: 310 m (1,020 ft)

Population (2011)
  - Total: 867
  - Density: 4.71/km^{2} (12.2/sq mi)
- Time zone: UTC−06:00
- Postal code: 21503

Cote is a district of the Guatuso canton in the Alajuela province of Costa Rica.

== Geography ==
Cote has an area of 183.94 km^{2} and an elevation of 310 metres.

== Demographics ==
Historical population
| Census | Pop. | ±% p.a. |
|---|---|---|
| 1973 | 968 | — |
| 1984 | 978 | +0.09% |
| 2000 | 982 | +0.03% |
| 2011 | 867 | −1.13% |
| 2022 | 1,083 | +2.04% |
Source: Instituto Nacional de Estadística y Censos; Centro Centroamericano de Población

For the 2011 census, Cote had a population of 867 inhabitants.

== Transportation ==
=== Road transportation ===
The district is covered by the following road route:

- National Route 143
