= San Jorge District =

District in Los Chiles canton, Alajuela province, Costa Rica

San Jorge
- District
- San Jorge district
- San Jorge district location in Costa Rica
- Coordinates: 10.7136358°N 84.6345053°W
- Country: Costa Rica
- Province: Alajuela
- Canton: Los Chiles

Area
  - Total: 214.94 km^{2} (82.99 sq mi)
- Elevation: 70 m (230 ft)

Population (2011)
  - Total: 2,673
  - Density: 12.44/km^{2} (32.21/sq mi)
- Time zone: UTC−06:00
- Postal code: 21404

San Jorge is a district of the Los Chiles canton, in the Alajuela province of Costa Rica.

== Geography ==
San Jorge has an area of 214.94 km^{2} and an elevation of 70 metres.

== Demographics ==
Historical population
Census	Pop.	±% p.a.
1973	612	—
1984	2,510	+13.69%
2000	2,848	+0.79%
2011	2,673	−0.57%
2022	3,973	+3.67%
Source: Instituto Nacional de Estadística y Censos; Centro Centroamericano de Población

For the 2011 census, San Jorge had a population of 2,673 inhabitants.

== Transportation ==
=== Road transportation ===
The district is covered by the following road routes:

- National Route 35
- National Route 733
- National Route 761
