= Buenavista District, Guatuso =

District in Guatuso canton, Alajuela province, Costa Rica

Buenavista
- District
- Interactive map of Buenavista
- Buenavista district location in Costa Rica
- Coordinates: 10.7761898°N 84.8145986°W
- Country: Costa Rica
- Province: Alajuela
- Canton: Guatuso

Area
  - Total: 150.97 km^{2} (58.29 sq mi)
- Elevation: 42 m (138 ft)

Population (2011)
  - Total: 1,573
  - Density: 10.42/km^{2} (26.99/sq mi)
- Time zone: UTC−06:00
- Postal code: 21502

Buenavista is a district of the Guatuso canton, in the Alajuela province of Costa Rica.

== Geography ==
Buenavista has an area of 150.97 km^{2} and an elevation of 42 metres.

== Demographics ==
Historical population
Census	Pop.	±% p.a.
1973	935	—
1984	2,107	+7.67%
2000	5,452	+6.12%
2011	1,573	−10.68%
2022	1,998	+2.20%
Source: Instituto Nacional de Estadística y Censos; Centro Centroamericano de Población

For the 2011 census, Buenavista had a population of 1,573 inhabitants.

== Transportation ==
=== Road transportation ===
The district is covered by the following road routes:

- National Route 4
- National Route 139
