= Guatuso (canton) =

Canton in Alajuela province, Costa Rica

- Canton
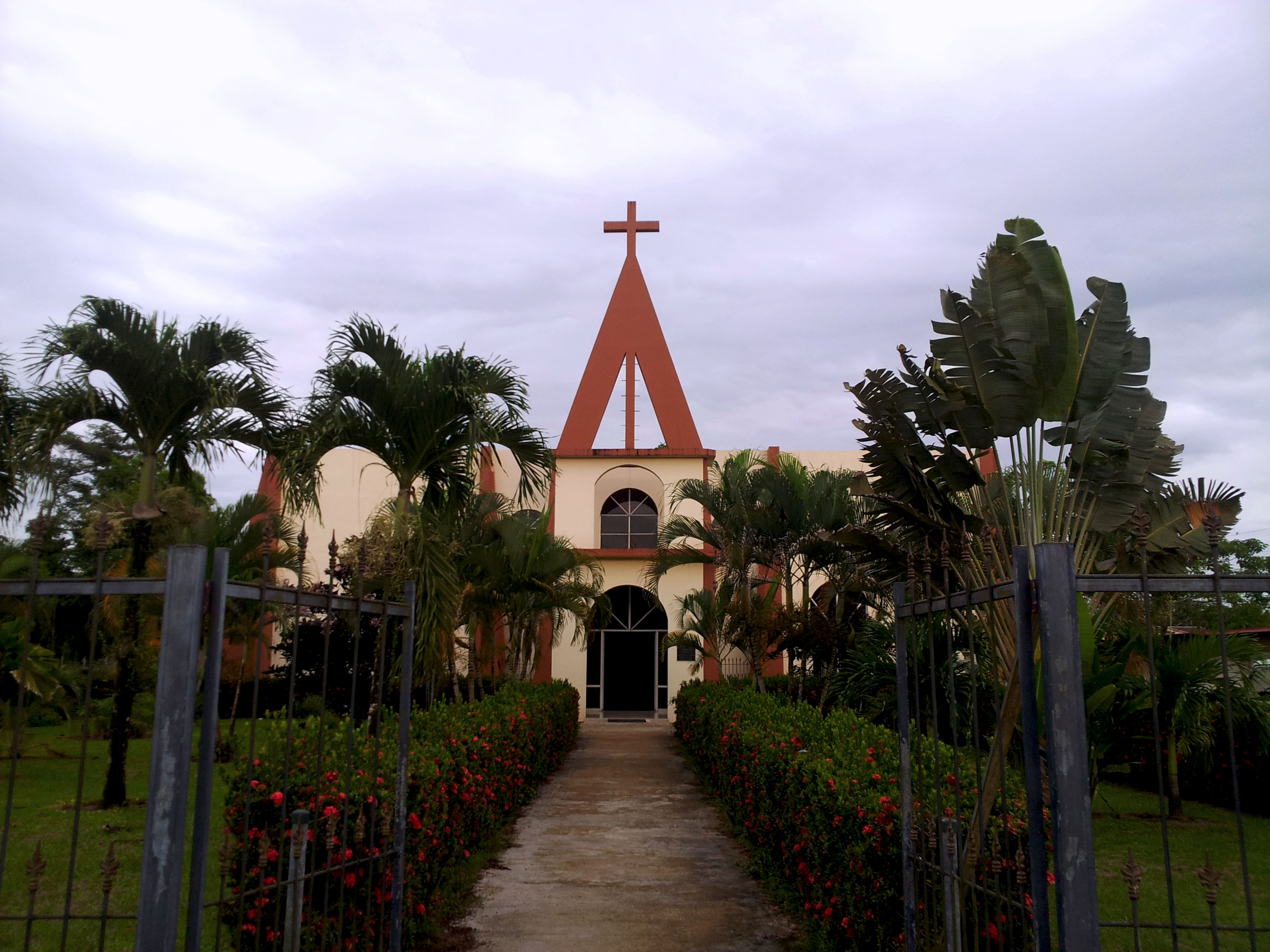
- San Rafael Church

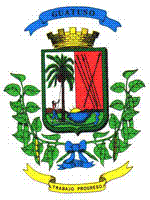
- Flag Seal
- Interactive map of Guatuso
- Guatuso canton location in Alajuela Province Guatuso canton location in Costa Rica
- Coordinates: 10.7031011°N 84.8297361°W
- Country: Costa Rica
- Province: Alajuela
- Creation: 17 March 1970
- Head city: San Rafael
- Districts: Districts: San Rafael; Buenavista; Cote; Katira

Government
  - Type: Municipality
  - Body: Municipalidad de Guatuso

Area
  - Total: 758.32 km^{2} (292.79 sq mi)
- Elevation: 140 m (460 ft)

Population (2011)
  - Total: 15,508
  - Density: 20.450/km^{2} (52.966/sq mi)
- Time zone: UTC−06:00
- Canton code: 215
- Website: muniguatuso.go.cr

Guatuso is a canton in the Alajuela province of Costa Rica.

== Toponymy ==
It is named for the region's original inhabitants, the Maleku, who remain as residents of the area.

== History ==
Guatuso was created on 17 March 1970 by decree 4541.

== Geography ==
Guatuso has an area of 758.32 km^{2} (292.79 sq mi) and a mean elevation of 140 metres.

It is a diamond-shaped canton, with the Purgatorio River and the Frío River as the northeast border, the Cucaracha River as a portion of the southeast border, the Cordillera de Guanacaste on the southwest border, and the Rito River and the Mónico River on the northwest. Tenorio Volcano marks the far western point of the canton.

== Districts ==
The canton of Guatuso is subdivided into the following districts:

1. San Rafael
2. Buenavista
3. Cote
4. Katira

== Demographics ==
Historical population
Census	Pop.	±% p.a.
1973	4,713	—
1984	6,774	+3.35%
2000	13,045	+4.18%
2011	15,508	+1.58%
2022	18,316	+1.52%
Source: Instituto Nacional de Estadística y Censos; Centro Centroamericano de Población

For the 2011 census, Guatuso had a population of 15,508 inhabitants.

== Transportation ==
=== Road transportation ===
The canton is covered by the following road routes:

- National Route 4
- National Route 139
- National Route 143
- National Route 733
