= Los Chiles (canton) =

Canton in Alajuela province, Costa Rica

- Canton
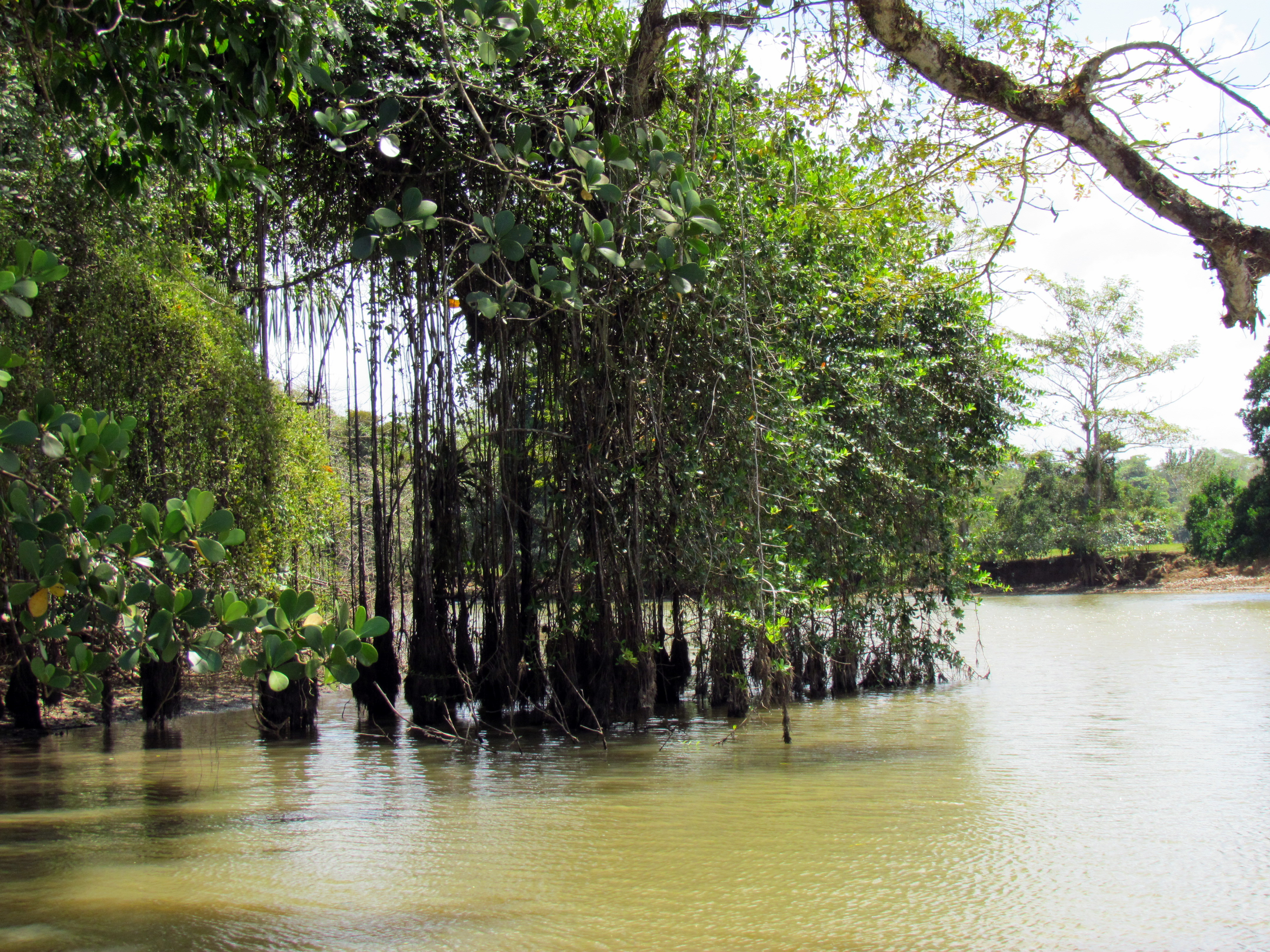
- Frío River

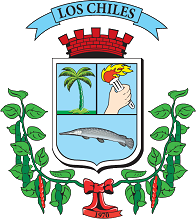
- Flag Seal
- Interactive map of Los Chiles
- Los Chiles canton location in Alajuela Province Los Chiles canton location in Costa Rica
- Coordinates: 10.8591282°N 84.673707°W
- Country: Costa Rica
- Province: Alajuela
- Creation: 17 March 1970
- Head city: Los Chiles
- Districts: Districts: Los Chiles; Caño Negro; El Amparo; San Jorge

Government
  - Type: Municipality
  - Body: Municipalidad de Los Chiles

Area
  - Total: 1,358.86 km^{2} (524.66 sq mi)
- Elevation: 47 m (154 ft)

Population (2011)
  - Total: 23,735
  - Density: 17.467/km^{2} (45.239/sq mi)
- Time zone: UTC−06:00
- Canton code: 214
- Website: {{URL|example.com|optional display text}}

Los Chiles is a canton in the Alajuela province of Costa Rica.

== Toponymy ==
Los Chiles translates and refers to bell peppers.

== History ==
Los Chiles was created on 17 March 1970 by decree 4541.

== Geography ==
Los Chiles has an area of 1,358.86 km^{2} and a mean elevation of 47 metres.

The canton lies along the border of Nicaragua at the top of the Llanura de San Carlos (San Carlos Plains) in north central Costa Rica. The Pocosol River forms the southeastern boundary of the canton, with (from north to south) the Rita, Mónico, Frío and the Purgatorio rivers establishing the southwestern border.

== Districts ==
The canton of Los Chiles is subdivided into the following districts:

1. Los Chiles
2. Caño Negro
3. El Amparo
4. San Jorge

== Demographics ==
Historical population
| Census | Pop. | ±% p.a. |
|---|---|---|
| 1973 | 5,596 | — |
| 1984 | 11,404 | +6.69% |
| 2000 | 19,732 | +3.49% |
| 2011 | 23,735 | +1.69% |
| 2022 | 34,701 | +3.51% |
Source: Instituto Nacional de Estadística y Censos; Centro Centroamericano de Población

For the 2011 census, Los Chiles had a population of 23,735 inhabitants.

== Transportation ==
=== Road transportation ===
The canton is covered by the following road routes:

- National Route 35
- National Route 138
- National Route 139
- National Route 733
- National Route 760
- National Route 761

== Economy ==
This is a low-lying, sparsely settled region primarily devoted to large agricultural enterprises.
