= National Route 761 (Costa Rica) =

National Road Route in Costa Rica

National Tertiary Route 761
- Ruta nacional terciaria 761

Route information
- Maintained by Ministry of Public Works and Transport
- Length: 43.590 km (27.086 mi)

Location
- Country: Costa Rica
- Provinces: Alajuela

Highway system
- National Road Network of Costa Rica
← Route 760	→ Route 801

National Tertiary Route 761, or just Route 761 (Spanish: Ruta Nacional Terciaria 761, or Ruta 761) is a National Road Route of Costa Rica, located in the Alajuela province.

== Description ==
In Alajuela province the route covers San Carlos canton (Pocosol district) and Los Chiles canton (San Jorge district).
