= Frío River (Costa Rica) =

River in Costa Rica and Nicaragua

Coordinates: 11.1165°N 84.7766°W

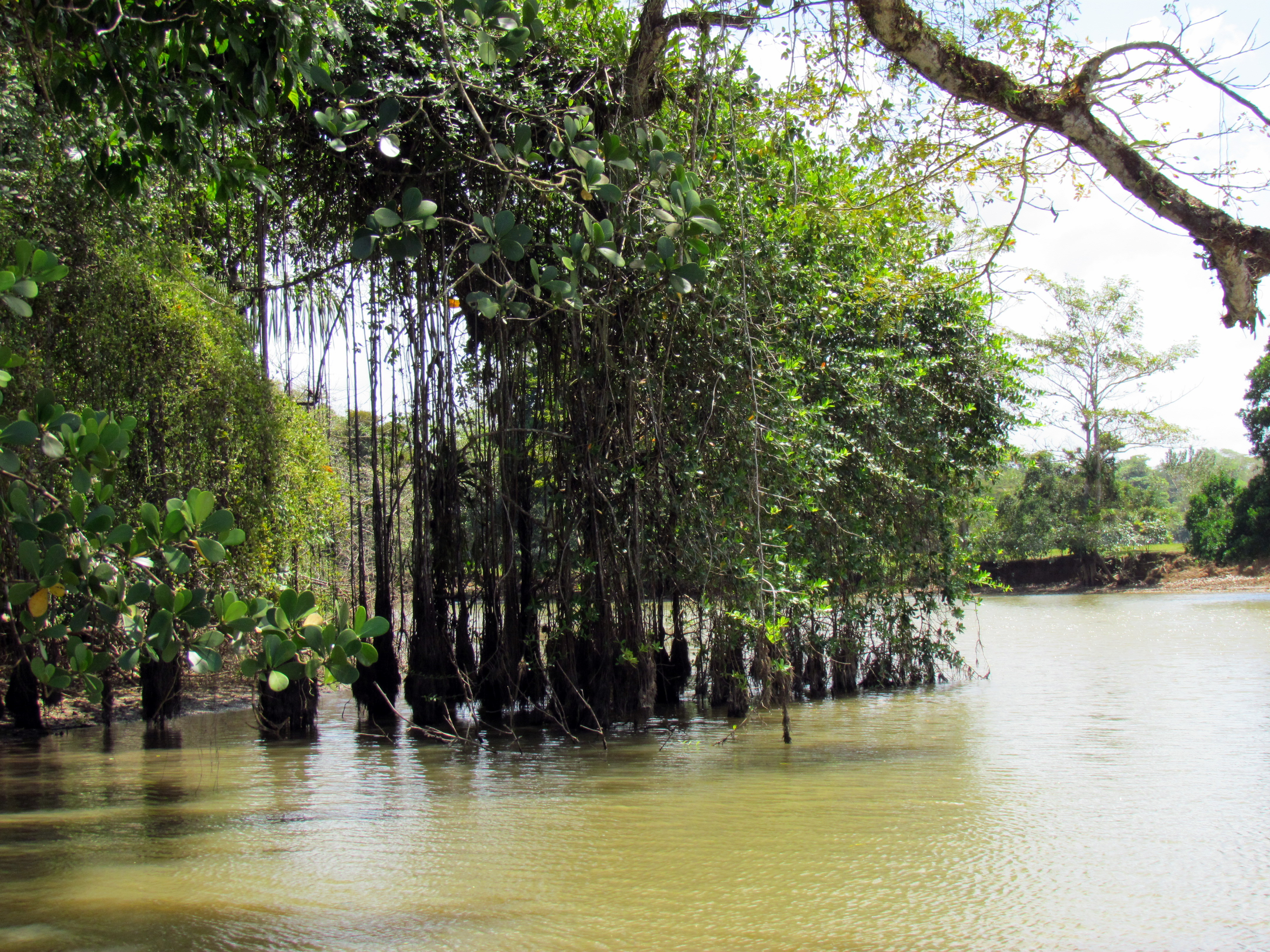
- Interactive map of Frío River
- Primary inflows: Arenal Volcano
- Primary outflows: San Juan River (Nicaragua)
- Basin countries: Nicaragua, Costa Rica

Frio River (Spanish: Río Frío) is a river of Costa Rica, Alajuela province. The last few kilometers it passes through Nicaragua.

The Frio River is a river located in Costa Rica, emerging from the northern slope on the Caribbean side of the country. It emerges from the foothills of the Tenorio Volcano and travels along the plains of the Guatusos in the north of Costa Rica. It empties into the San Juan River (Nicaragua) shortly before it joins Lake Nicaragua. In the lower part of its basin lies Caño Negro Wildlife Refuge.
