= National Route 732 (Costa Rica) =

National Road Route in Costa Rica

National Tertiary Route 732
- Ruta nacional terciaria 732

Route information
- Maintained by Ministry of Public Works and Transport
- Length: 14.830 km (9.215 mi)

Location
- Country: Costa Rica
- Provinces: Alajuela

Highway system
- National Road Network of Costa Rica
← Route 731	→ Route 733

National Tertiary Route 732, or just Route 732 (Spanish: Ruta Nacional Terciaria 732, or Ruta 732) is a National Road Route of Costa Rica located in the Alajuela province.

== Description ==
In Alajuela province the route covers Upala canton (Aguas Claras and San José districts).
