= National Route 35 (Costa Rica) =

Road in Costa Rica

National Primary Route 35
- Ruta nacional primaria 35
- Dotted line depicts new road to San Carlos under construction since 2005, to be finished in 2025.

Route information
- Maintained by Ministry of Public Works and Transport
- Length: 92.380 km (57.402 mi)
- History: To be finished in 2025

Major junctions
- South end: Route 1 (Under construction, 2019)
- Route 141 (Current end, 2019); Route 4
- North end: NIC-25B

Location
- Country: Costa Rica
- Provinces: Alajuela

Highway system
- National Road Network of Costa Rica
← Route 34	→ Route 36

National Primary Route 35, or just Route 35 (Spanish: Ruta Nacional Primaria 35, or Ruta 35) is a National Road Route of Costa Rica, located in the Alajuela province, and it is a road that serves the central north area of Costa Rica.

== Description ==
Completely contained in the Alajuela province, this is as of 2019 an almost straight road between San Carlos and Los Chiles, this road together with Route 4 and Route 32 allows the access between the Caribbean side of the country to the northern Alajuela districts and Nicaragua.

Since 2005 a new segment is under construction to expand the road to Route 1 towards San Jose, the project is known as the Eje Interior Norte (North Internal Axis).

In Alajuela province the route covers San Carlos canton (Florencia, Cutris, and Pocosol districts) and Los Chiles canton (Los Chiles, El Amparo, and San Jorge districts).

=== National Route 768 ===
National Tertiary Route 768 was a 6 km road created to link the north end of Route 35 at Los Chiles to Nicaragua National Route 25B. It is now part of Route 35. Allows international access to Nicaragua using the migration checkpoint of Las Tablillas.

== History ==
=== New road to San Carlos ===
A new road between Route 1 and San Carlos, using the current Route 35 has been in construction since 2005, approved by the Legislative Assembly in December 1969, the initial plans are from the first half of the 1970s, with designs from 1989. The project was split into three subprojects, with a projected finish date of around 2025, after more than fifty years of the project ratification.

==== North end (Abundancia to Florencia) ====
Finished in September 2018, this segment connects in a more straightforward way the towns of Ciudad Quesada and Florencia. The segment has a length of 5.6 km whereas the previous journey was of 8.1 km using Route 141 through a windy narrow road and several small towns. A new junction with a ground level roundabout and a lower level direct road was constructed.

==== Central segment (Sifón to Abundancia) ====
Of around 30 km, construction started in 2005, but was stalled due to several geological, environmental, and financial issues, including:

- The La Culebra wetland, wasn't taken into account, and the route would go across it.
- Seventy three geological faults not documented and found until while in construction.
- The already constructed bridge over Laguna river will be demolished due to a geological fault, a new path was designed.

In August 2018 the government then suspended the contract with the Sánchez-Carvajal construction company. As of 2019 there is an estimated 60% completion of this segment, however steel materials have been stolen due to the abandoned state of the project.

This project is now further split:

- Between La Abundancia and Alto Sucre junction, and a new tertiary route of 8 km. Estimated end date of 2021.
- Between Sucre and Sifón, of 23 km, making use of the constructed and abandoned two lane bridges over the rivers of Barranca, Tapezco, Arenas, Seco, San Cristóbal and Ron Ron. The bridges of Espino and La Vieja rivers will be newly constructed with four lanes.
- Further widening of the mentioned bridges to four lanes, between 2022 and 2025.

==== South end (San Miguel de Naranjo, or San Ramón, to Sifón) ====
In the planning and design stage as of September 2019, construction will have a planned start date of January 2022 and finish date of March 2024.
