= National Route 760 (Costa Rica) =

National Road Route in Costa Rica

National Tertiary Route 760
- Ruta nacional terciaria 760

Route information
- Maintained by Ministry of Public Works and Transport
- Length: 21.690 km (13.478 mi)

Location
- Country: Costa Rica
- Provinces: Alajuela

Highway system
- National Road Network of Costa Rica
← Route 757	→ Route 761

National Tertiary Route 760, or just Route 760 (Spanish: Ruta Nacional Terciaria 760, or Ruta 760) is a National Road Route of Costa Rica, located in the Alajuela province.

== Description ==
In Alajuela province the route covers Los Chiles canton (Los Chiles district).
