= Caño Negro District =

District in Los Chiles canton, Alajuela province, Costa Rica

Caño Negro
- District
- Interactive map of Caño Negro
- Caño Negro district location in Costa Rica
- Coordinates: 10.9267233°N 84.8051868°W
- Country: Costa Rica
- Province: Alajuela
- Canton: Los Chiles

Area
  - Total: 301 km^{2} (116 sq mi)
- Elevation: 30 m (98 ft)

Population (2011)
  - Total: 1,808
  - Density: 6.01/km^{2} (15.6/sq mi)
- Time zone: UTC−06:00
- Postal code: 21402

Caño Negro is a district of the Los Chiles canton, in the Alajuela province of Costa Rica.

== Geography ==
Caño Negro has an area of 301 km^{2} and an elevation of 30 metres.

== Demographics ==
Historical population
Census	Pop.	±% p.a.
1973	915	—
1984	1,231	+2.73%
2000	1,594	+1.63%
2011	1,808	+1.15%
2022	2,341	+2.38%
Source: Instituto Nacional de Estadística y Censos; Centro Centroamericano de Población

For the 2011 census, Caño Negro had a population of 1,808 inhabitants.

== Transportation ==
=== Road transportation ===
The district is covered by the following road routes:

- National Route 138
- National Route 139
