= National Route 731 (Costa Rica) =

National Road Route in Costa Rica

National Tertiary Route 731
- Ruta nacional terciaria 731

Route information
- Maintained by Ministry of Public Works and Transport
- Length: 12.160 km (7.556 mi)

Location
- Country: Costa Rica
- Provinces: Alajuela

Highway system
- National Road Network of Costa Rica
← Route 730	→ Route 732

National Tertiary Route 731, or just Route 731 (Spanish: Ruta Nacional Terciaria 731, or Ruta 731) is a National Road Route of Costa Rica located in the Alajuela province.

== Description ==
In Alajuela province the route covers Upala canton (Upala and Yolillal districts).
