= La Virgen =

District in Sarapiquí canton, Heredia province, Costa Rica

- District
- Interactive map of La Virgen
- La Virgen district location in Costa Rica
- Coordinates: 10.431176°N 84.0771857°W
- Country: Costa Rica
- Province: Heredia
- Canton: Sarapiquí

Area
  - Total: 513.82 km^{2} (198.39 sq mi)
- Elevation: 187 m (614 ft)

Population (2011)
  - Total: 10,521
  - Density: 20.476/km^{2} (53.033/sq mi)
- Time zone: UTC−06:00
- Postal code: 41002

La Virgen is a district of the Sarapiquí canton in the Heredia province of Costa Rica.

== Geography ==
La Virgen has an area of 513.82 km^{2} (198.39 sq mi) and an elevation of 187 metres.

It presents a mountainous territory in its south end whereas in north direction the land goes down and ends in the plains of Sarapiquí.

== Location ==
It is located in the northern region of the country and borders the districts of Cureña to the north, Varablanca de Heredia to the south, Puerto Viejo and Horquetas to the east. While to the west it borders with the province of Alajuela.

Its head, the town of La Virgen, is located 16.4 km (18 minutes) to the south of Puerto Viejo and 78.6 km (2 hours 9 minutes) to the N of San José, the nation's capital.

== Demographics ==
Historical population
Census	Pop.	±% p.a.
1973	3,108	—
1984	4,451	+3.32%
2000	7,648	+3.44%
2011	10,521	+2.94%
2022	13,071	+1.99%
Source: Instituto Nacional de Estadística y Censos; Centro Centroamericano de Población

For the 2011 census, La Virgen had a population of 10,521 inhabitants.

In this case, it is the third most populated area of the canton, behind Puerto Viejo y de Horquetas.

== Settlements ==
The 31 population centers in the district are:

- La Virgen (head of the district)
- Ángeles
- Arbolitos (parte)
- Bajos de Chilamate
- Boca Sardinal
- Bosque
- Búfalo
- Delicias
- El Uno
- Esquipulas
- Las Palmitas
- Laquí
- Lomas
- Llano Grande
- Magsaysay
- Masaya
- Medias (parte)
- Pangola
- Pozo Azul
- Quebrada Grande
- Río Magdaleno
- Roble
- San Gerardo (parte)
- San Isidro
- San José Sur
- San Ramón
- La Delia
- Sardinal
- Tirimbina
- Vega de Sardinal (parte)
- Venados

== Economy ==
The extensive export-oriented pineapple is one of the foundations of the local economy.

The Virgin, its head, has health services, education, lodging, and entertainment in recreational areas.

Tourism has an important presence in which the activities of wildlife observation and rafting tours in the Sarapiquí River stand out.

As for the trade, it emphasizes the sale of fast foods, groceries, shoes, clothes, appliances, and souvenirs.

== Transportation ==
=== Road transportation ===
The district is covered by the following road routes:

- National Route 4
- National Route 126
- National Route 506
- National Route 745
