= National Route 733 (Costa Rica) =

National Road Route in Costa Rica

National Tertiary Route 733
- Ruta nacional terciaria 733

Route information
- Maintained by Ministry of Public Works and Transport
- Length: 41.480 km (25.774 mi)

Location
- Country: Costa Rica
- Provinces: Alajuela

Highway system
- National Road Network of Costa Rica
← Route 732	→ Route 734

National Tertiary Route 733, or just Route 733 (Spanish: Ruta Nacional Terciaria 733, or Ruta 733) is a National Road Route of Costa Rica, located in the Alajuela province.

== Description ==
In Alajuela province the route covers Los Chiles canton (San Jorge district) and Guatuso canton (San Rafael district).
