= National Route 6 (Costa Rica) =

National Road Route in Costa Rica

National Primary Route 6
- Ruta nacional primaria 6

Route information
- Maintained by Ministry of Public Works and Transport
- Length: 59.110 km (36.729 mi)

Location
- Country: Costa Rica
- Provinces: Alajuela, Guanacaste

Highway system
- National Road Network of Costa Rica
← Route 5	→ Route 10

National Primary Route 6, or just Route 6 (Spanish: Ruta Nacional Primaria 6, or Ruta 6) is a National Road Route of Costa Rica located in the Alajuela and Guanacaste provinces.

== Description ==
In Alajuela province the route covers Upala canton (Upala, Bijagua, and Canalete districts).

In Guanacaste province the route covers Bagaces canton (Río Naranjo district) and Cañas canton (Cañas and Palmira districts).
