= List of highways numbered 734 =

The following highways are numbered 734:

== Canada ==
- Alberta Highway 734
- Saskatchewan Highway 734

== Costa Rica ==
- National Route 734

== India ==
- National Highway 734 (India)

== United States ==
- SR 734
- PR-734
- FM 734
- Virginia State Route 734 (Loudoun County) (Snicker's Gap Turnpike)

Preceded by 733	Lists of highways 734	Succeeded by 735
