= Sarapiquí River =

River in Costa Rica

Coordinates: 10°40′59″N 83°57′23″W

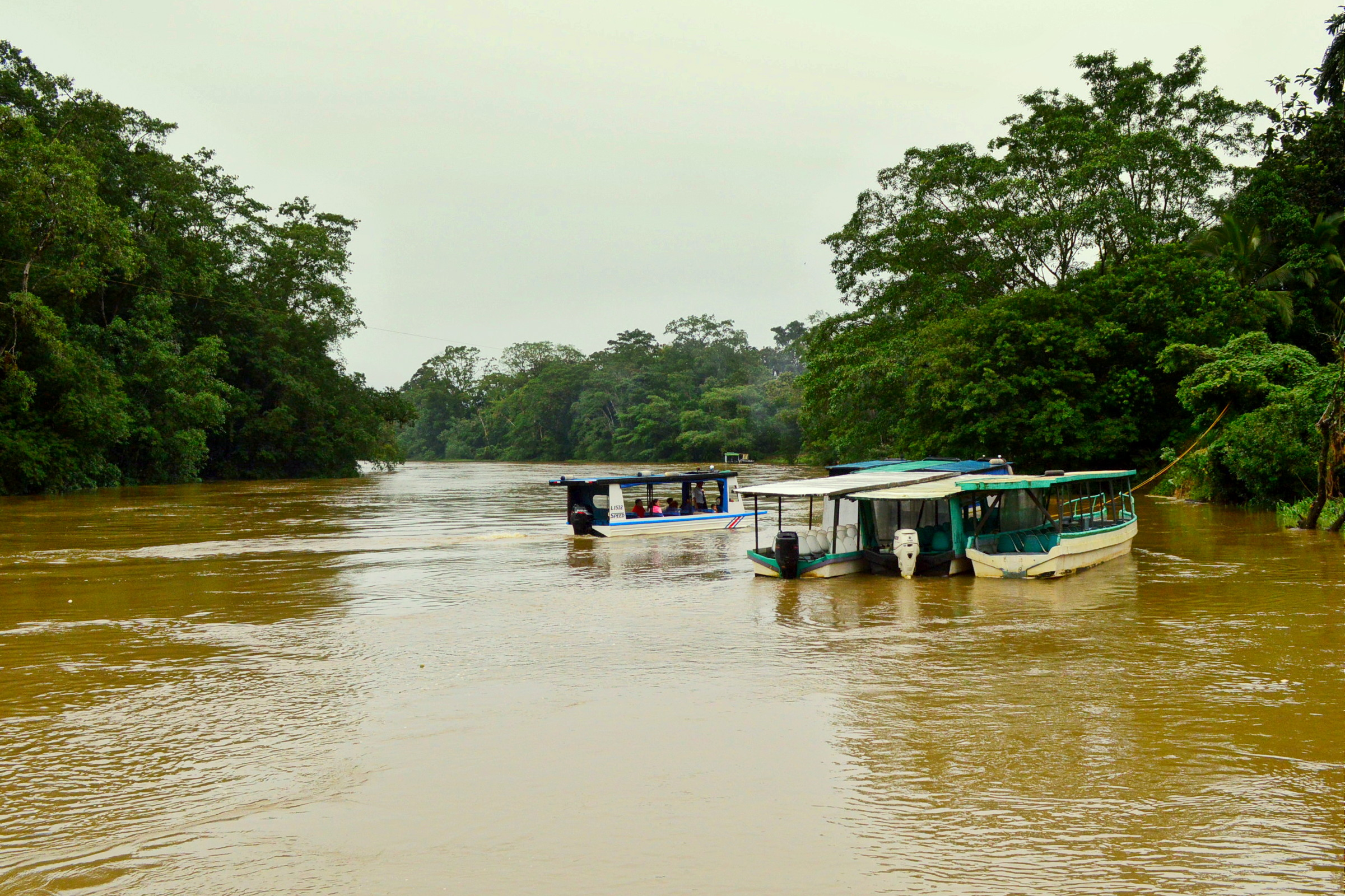
Tour boats on the river

Rafting on the Sarapiqui river

The Sarapiquí River, or Rio Sarapiquí, in Costa Rica is a tributary of the San Juan River and forms the eastern border of Sarapiquí Canton. The area around the river is mostly lowlands tropical rainforest, having lush vegetation with a large variety of plant, animal and insect life. This river is navigable and is a local trading artery, and also supports fishing and tourism activity.

The river, which was previously called 'Siripiqui', is prone to flooding.

Around the river are plantations of coffee, sugar cane, bananas and cocoa trees.

The 2009 Costa Rica earthquake near Cinchona greatly affected the Sarapiqui River.

Since the privatisation of electricity production in the country, the river has seen a number of hydroelectric dams being built along the watercourse. In 2012, corruption linked to the hydroelectric dams caused widespread outrage.

The river is considered a national monument because of the vital service it provided in transporting arms, goods and soldiers in the 1856 war against the filibusters.
