= Caño Negro Wildlife Refuge =

Wildlife refuge in northern Costa Rica

- IUCN category IV (habitat/species management area)
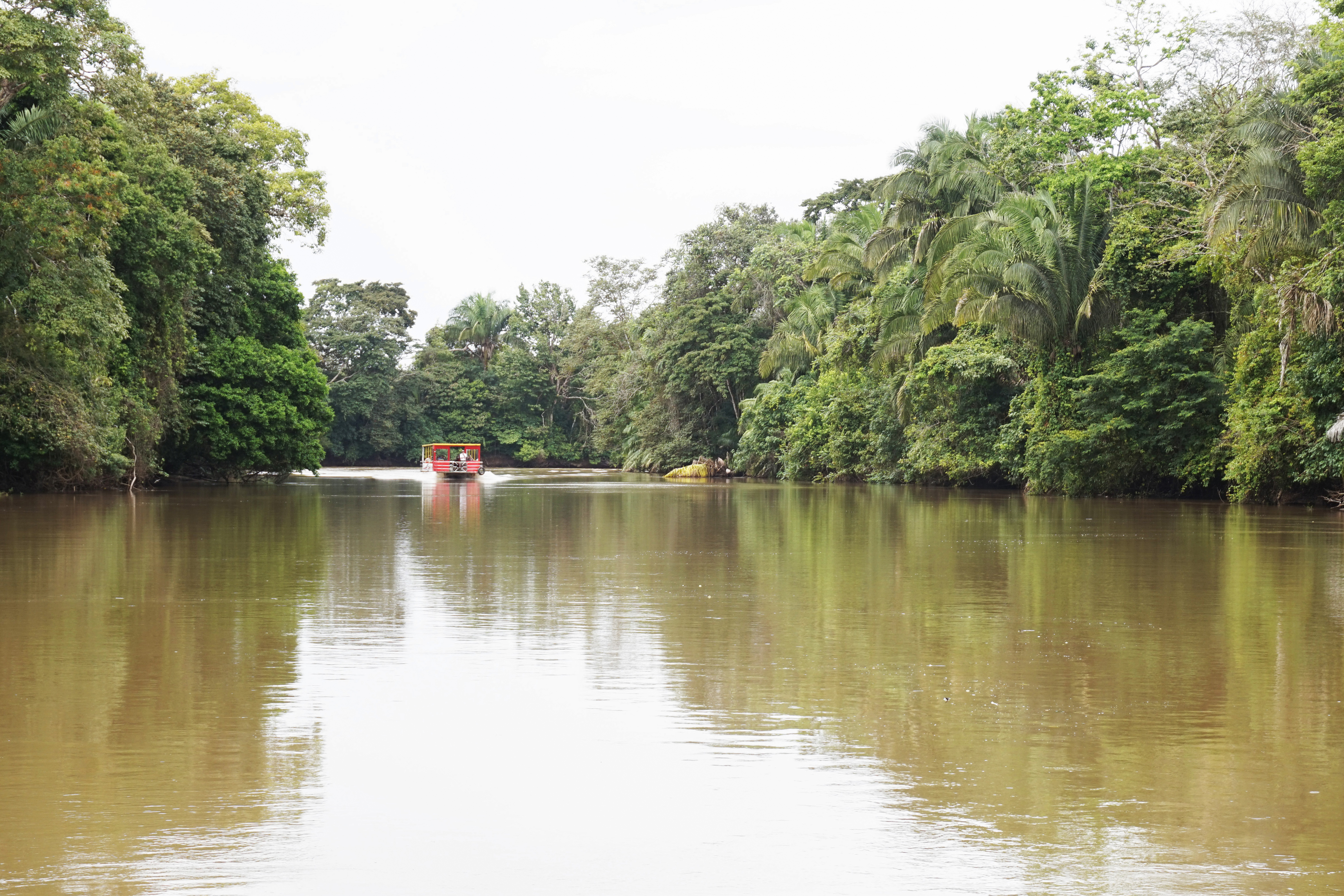
- Frío River in Caño Negro Wildlife Reserve

- Location within Costa Rica
- Location: Alajuela Province, Costa Rica
- Nearest city: Upala
- Coordinates: 10°52′39″N 84°46′03″W
- Area: 25,100 acres (102 km^{2})
- Established: 1984
- Governing body: National System of Conservation Areas (SINAC)

Ramsar Wetland
- Official name: Caño Negro
- Designated: 27 December 1991
- Reference no.: 541

Caño Negro Wildlife Refuge is a wildlife refuge, part of the Arenal Huetar Norte Conservation Area, in the northern part of Costa Rica, 30 kilometres (19 mi) southeast of Upala near the border with Nicaragua in the Alajuela province. The refuge is a wetlands site that is home to many migratory waterfowl during part of the year. It was designated a reserve in 1984 and a Ramsar site on 27 December 1991.

== Description ==
The refuge is located in the lower basin of the Frío River, split between two cantons: 83% in Los Chiles, with the rest in Guatuso. It sits at an altitude of around 30 metres (98 ft) above sea level.

The Ramsar site describes it as "a shallow freshwater lagoon ... surrounded by seasonally inundated marshes and woodland." That lagoon, Laguna Caño Negro, is fed by the Frío River and its tributary the Río Mónico during the rainy season. It covers about 800 hectares (2,000 acres) at its greatest extent, but during the dry season from January to April, it shrinks into separate smaller lakes, including Laguna San Sebastián.

Wetlands occupy approximately 3,500 hectares (8,600 acres) of Caño Negro. They consist of "slow-flowing rivers, streams, mangrove swamps, seasonally flooded grasslands, lowlands, palm groves, and permanently and seasonally flooded woodlands."

A 2009 survey determined that the government owned 56% of the refuge, nearly all of it bodies of water, while the rest, 4,427 hectares (10,940 acres), was privately owned.

== Climate ==
The average temperature is 26 °C (79 °F), and the average annual rainfall is 2,015 mm (79.3 in), or 2,800 mm (110 in). The dry season, from January to April, averages less than 100 mm (3.9 in), with March and April usually getting less than 25 mm (0.98 in).

== Wildlife ==
It is an important site for many migratory bird species. More than 230 bird species have been detected in the mangroves.

There are also caimans and tropical gar (Atractosteus tropicus), among many other species.

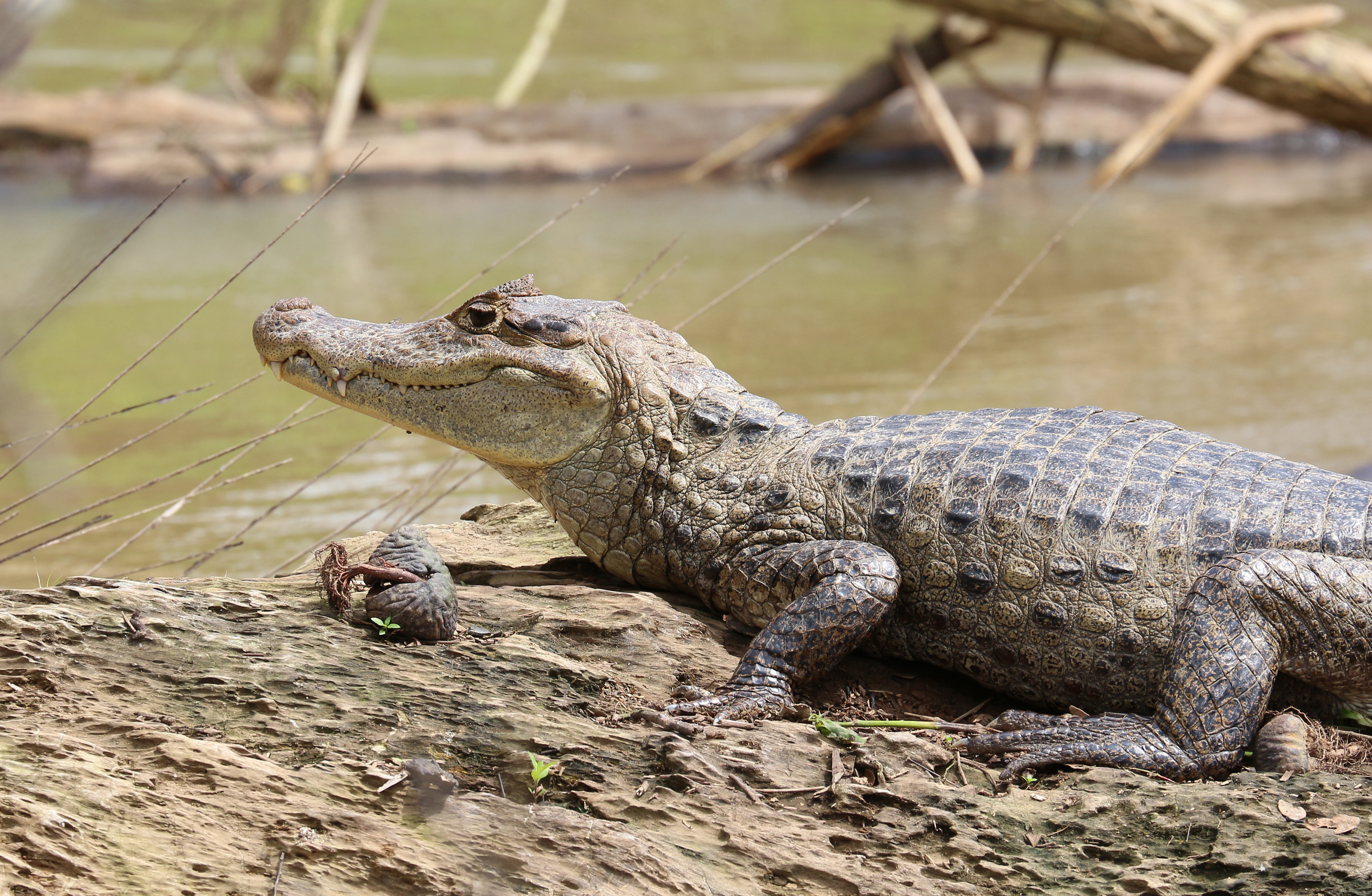
Spectacled caiman

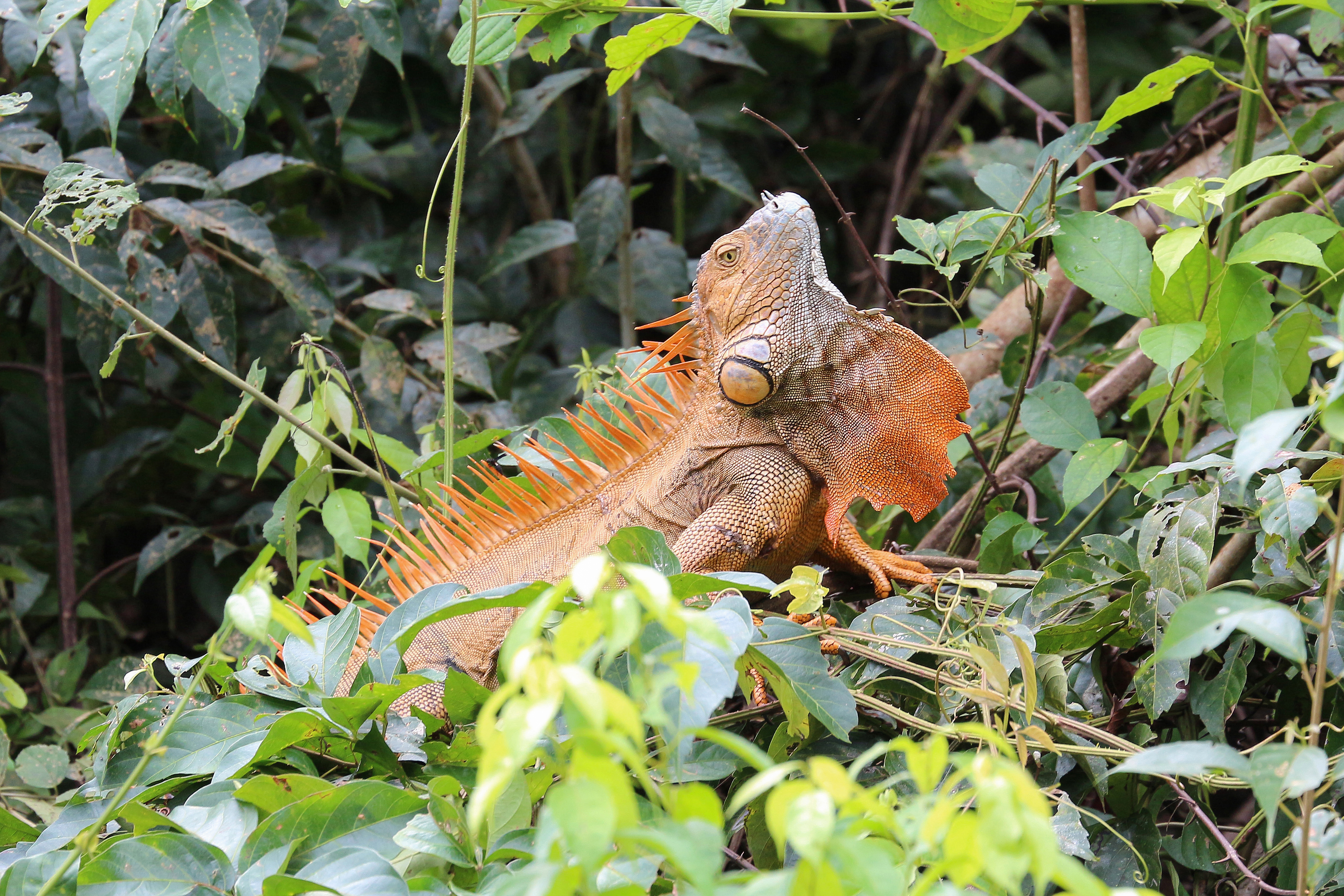
Green iguana

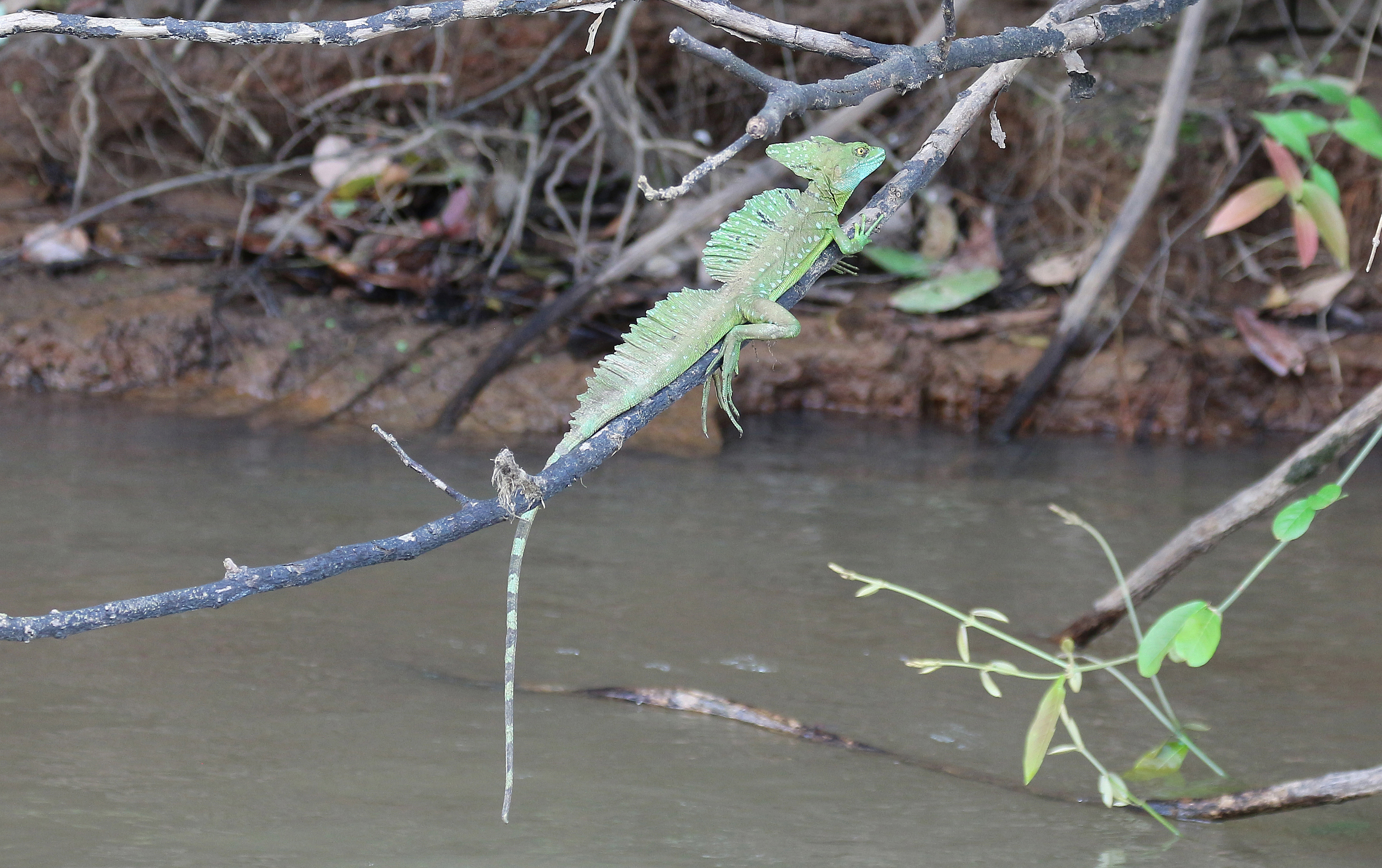
Common basilisk

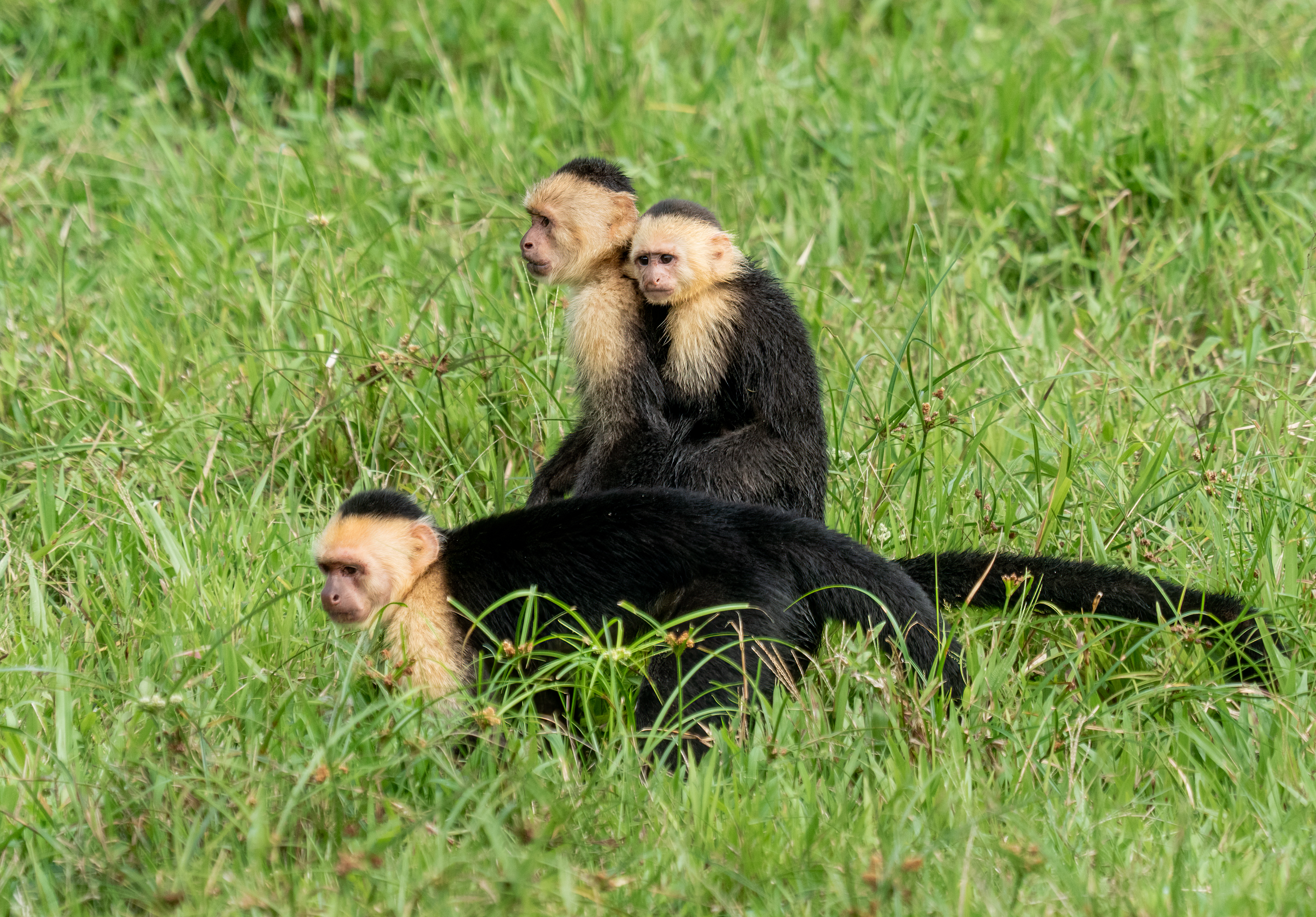
Panamanian white-faced capuchins

== Facilities ==
At one time, there were no public facilities and the area could only be explored by boat, but an undated Costa Rica Star article states that a visitor's center, a pier adjacent to the center, and walkways have been built to make it accessible even to the wheelchair-bound.
