= Upala =

District in Upala canton, Alajuela province, Costa Rica

- District
- Upala district
- Upala district location in Costa Rica
- Coordinates: 10.8645353°N 84.9942032°W
- Country: Costa Rica
- Province: Alajuela
- Canton: Upala

Area
  - Total: 148.65 km^{2} (57.39 sq mi)
- Elevation: 48 m (157 ft)

Population (2011)
  - Total: 16,139
  - Density: 108.57/km^{2} (281.20/sq mi)
- Time zone: UTC−06:00
- Postal code: 21301

Upala is a district of the Upala canton in the Alajuela province of Costa Rica.

== History ==
Upala was granted the title of "ciudad" (city) by a law of May 4, 1970.

== Geography ==
Upala has an area of 148.65 km^{2} and an elevation of 48 metres.

It is in the northwest corner of the San Carlos Plain (Llanura de San Carlos) in northern Costa Rica, 76 kilometers (47 mi) southeast of La Cruz, 124 kilometers (77 mi) northwest of Ciudad Quesada, 195 kilometers (121 mi) from the provincial capital city of Alajuela, and 214 kilometers (133 mi) from the national capital city of San José.

== Demographics ==
Historical population
Census	Pop.	±% p.a.
1963	10,001	—
1973	5,492	−5.82%
1984	7,008	+2.24%
2000	12,372	+3.62%
2011	16,139	+2.45%
2022	14,154	−1.19%
Source: Instituto Nacional de Estadística y Censos; Centro Centroamericano de Población

For the 2011 census, Upala had a population of 16,139 inhabitants.

== Transportation ==
=== Road transportation ===
The district is covered by the following road routes:

- National Route 4
- National Route 6
- National Route 138
- National Route 164
- National Route 728
- National Route 729
- National Route 730
- National Route 731

== Economy ==
Upala is a supply center for cattle ranchers and rice growers in the area. A hospital, bank, medical clinic, pharmacy, and gas station are here. There is a busy commercial marketplace in the town center where vendors sell fruits, vegetables and a wide array of other home-grown products. Several small restaurants share the market area, and there are other restaurants and a few places to stay in the town.

== Nearby places of interest ==
Caño Negro Wildlife Refuge is a watery lowland of lush sloughs and marshes, a seasonal lake, and abundant wildlife. The area is a birdwatcher's paradise. (37 kilometers (23 mi) east of Upala via Highway 4 to Colonia Puntarenas and Highway 138 to Caño Negro)

== Climate ==
This area typically has a pronounced dry season. According to the Köppen Climate Classification system, Upala has a tropical savanna climate, abbreviated "Aw" on climate maps.

Climate data for Upala
Month	Jan	Feb	Mar	Apr	May	Jun	Jul	Aug	Sep	Oct	Nov	Dec	Year
Mean daily maximum °C (°F)	30.6 (87.1)	31.3 (88.3)	33.1 (91.6)	34.0 (93.2)	34.0 (93.2)	32.8 (91.0)	31.8 (89.2)	32.4 (90.3)	32.5 (90.5)	32.1 (89.8)	31.1 (88.0)	30.6 (87.1)	32.2 (90.0)
Daily mean °C (°F)	24.4 (75.9)	24.6 (76.3)	25.7 (78.3)	26.4 (79.5)	26.9 (80.4)	26.8 (80.2)	26.3 (79.3)	26.5 (79.7)	26.5 (79.7)	26.2 (79.2)	25.4 (77.7)	24.7 (76.5)	25.9 (78.6)
Mean daily minimum °C (°F)	18.2 (64.8)	17.9 (64.2)	18.2 (64.8)	18.7 (65.7)	19.8 (67.6)	20.8 (69.4)	20.7 (69.3)	20.7 (69.3)	20.5 (68.9)	20.4 (68.7)	19.7 (67.5)	18.9 (66.0)	19.5 (67.1)
Average precipitation mm (inches)	111.1 (4.37)	68.0 (2.68)	38.2 (1.50)	53.4 (2.10)	185.1 (7.29)	325.3 (12.81)	322.0 (12.68)	317.9 (12.52)	281.0 (11.06)	283.9 (11.18)	227.9 (8.97)	185.2 (7.29)	2,399 (94.45)
Average precipitation days (≥ 1.0 mm)	16	10	7	7	15	22	24	23	21	21	19	19	204
Average relative humidity (%)	86.8	82.6	78.0	76.2	82.0	87.9	88.8	88.7	87.2	87.5	88.2	88.1	85.2
Mean monthly sunshine hours	155.0	163.9	207.7	186.0	158.1	117.0	89.9	108.5	117.0	130.2	123.0	127.1	1,683.4
Mean daily sunshine hours	5.0	5.8	6.7	6.2	5.1	3.9	2.9	3.5	3.9	4.2	4.1	4.1	4.6
Source: Instituto Meteorologico Nacional (precipitation 1963–2012, temperatures 1990–2013, sun 1984–1995, humidity 1989–2013)
