= Puerto Viejo, Sarapiquí =

District in Sarapiquí canton, Heredia province, Costa Rica

Puerto Viejo de Sarapiquí Puerto Viejo
- District
- Puerto Viejo district
- Puerto Viejo district location in Costa Rica
- Coordinates: 10.5737236°N 83.9547925°W
- Country: Costa Rica
- Province: Heredia
- Canton: Sarapiquí

Area
  - Total: 428.17 km^{2} (165.32 sq mi)
- Elevation: 37 m (121 ft)

Population (2020)
  - Total: 29,785
  - Density: 69.563/km^{2} (180.17/sq mi)
- Time zone: UTC−06:00
- Postal code: 41001
- Climate: Af

Puerto Viejo de Sarapiquí is a district of the Sarapiquí canton, in the Heredia province of Costa Rica. Spread over an area of 428.17 km^{2} (165.32 sq mi), it is the largest city in the canton. It is located at the foothills of the Cordillera mountains in the northeastern part of the country. The economy is mainly dependent on agriculture and tourism.

== Geography ==
Puerto Viejo is a district of the Sarapiquí canton in the Heredia province of Costa Rica. It is located to close to the Nicaraguan border in the north eastern part of the country. It is spread over an area of 428.17 km^{2} (165.32 sq mi), and is the largest city in the Sarapiquí canton. It is located in the Central highlands of Costa Rica, at the foothills of the Cordillera mountains and has a mean elevation of 37 m (121 ft). The Sarapiquí and Puerto Viejo rivers pass through the city, and support several species of wildlife and other river related adventure activities.

The town has a hot and humid climate with no distinct seasons. It receives most of the rainfall from June to August and November to January.

== Demographics and economy ==
As per 2020 estimate, there were 29,785 inhabitants, including 15,453 males and 14,332 females. About 8,712 (29.2%) of the population was below the age of fourteen. The majority (64.2%) of the population was classified as rural, and the rest (35.8%) as urban.

The economy of the town is dependent on agriculture and tourism. The surrounding areas of the town has several banana and pineapple plantations. The rainforests in the region, the nearby protected areas, and activities along the river contribute to tourism. The rivers in the region serve as a major lifeline and are used to transport agricultural produce and people.
