= Arenal =

Arenal may refer to:

== People with the surname ==
- Concepción Arenal (1820–1893), Spanish feminist writer and activist
- Electa Arenal (1935–1969), Mexican muralist
- Luis Arenal Bastar (c. 1900–1985), Mexican painter, engraver and sculptor
- Elena Huerta de Arenal (1908–1997), Mexican muralist

== Places ==
- Arenal, Arizona, one of the 19th century Pima Villages
- Arenal, Yoro, a municipality in Honduras
- Arenal del Sur, a town in Bolívar Department, Colombia
- Arenal d'en Castell, a small town in Es Mercadal, Minorca
- Nuevo Arenal, a town and district in Tilarán Canton, Costa Rica
- Arenal Airport, an airport serving La Fortuna, Costa Rica
- Arenal Botanical Gardens, on the shore of Lake Arenal, Costa Rica
- Arenal Bridge, a reinforced concrete bridge in Bilbao, Spain
- Arenal District, Paita, Peru
- Arenal River, Costa Rica, a tributary of the San Carlos River
- Arenal Volcano, a volcano in Costa Rica
- Lake Arenal, a lake in Costa Rica

== Other uses ==
- UD Arenal, a football team based in S'Arenal de Llucmajor, Balearic Islands

== See also ==
- El Arenal (disambiguation)
- Arenal District (disambiguation)
