= Nuevo Arenal =

District in Tilarán canton, Guanacaste province, Costa Rica

- Town
- Nuevo Arenal town location in Costa Rica
- Coordinates: 10°32′49″N 84°53′58″W
- Country: Costa Rica
- Province: Guanacaste
- Canton: Tilarán
- District: Arenal
- Creation: 1978
- Time zone: UTC−06:00
- Postal code: 50807

Nuevo Arenal is a town located in the Arenal district of Tilarán Canton in the Guanacaste Province, Costa Rica. It is located on the north shore of Lake Arenal. The former village of Arenal near the La Fortuna area was inundated in 1978 with the formation of the artificial Lake Arenal. Nuevo Arenal was a government project to relocate the displaced people. Nuevo Arenal is located about a one-hour drive northwest from the original village along a beautiful paved lakeside road that goes from La Fortuna to Tilarán.

It is connected by road to Tejona and Tilarán along Route 142.

Hotel Los Héroes is one of the main hotels about 10 km east of Nuevo Arenal. There are several Bed and Breakfasts within the area, the most notable being Chalet Nicholas, Casa Gisela and Villa Decary. The town has notable German, Costa Rican, and Italian restaurants, a pizza place called Moya's. There is an organic food source called La Farmacia Orgánica on Route 734 adjacent to the gymnasium and the only gas station in the area. There is a pharmacy, two hardware stores, and several grocery stores of different sizes in the town.
