= El Silencio, Costa Rica =

El Silencio
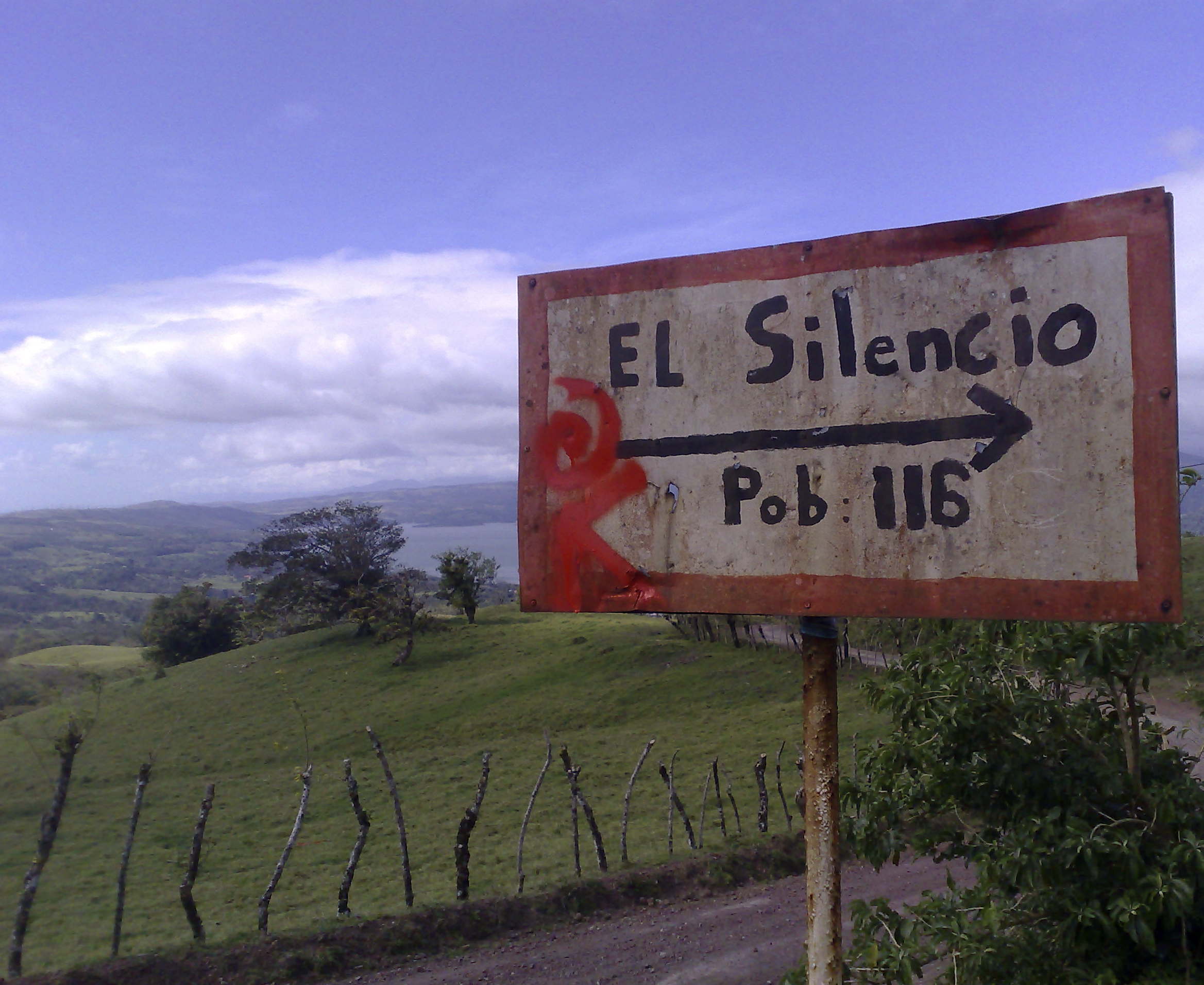

- Location in Costa Rica
- Coordinates: 10°29′N 84°55′W
- Country: Costa Rica
- Province: Guanacaste Province
- Canton: Tilaran

Population
  - Total: 116
- Time zone: UTC-6 (UTC -6)

El Silencio is a village and nature park in the Guanacaste Province, Costa Rica, in the hills overlooking the west shore of Lake Arenal. It is a very good tropical forest area for viewing birds and monkeys, and also contains the active Arenal Volcano. It has several kilometres of trails for hiking and photography. The entrance fee (as of March 2010) is $14 USD per day. It is connected by road to Tilarán, which connects via National Route 142 to Tejona.
