= Unión, Guanacaste =

Unión
- Location in Costa Rica
- Coordinates: 10°30′N 84°51′W
- Country: Costa Rica
- Province: Guanacaste Province
- Canton: Tilaran
- Time zone: UTC-6 (UTC -6)

Unión is a village in the Guanacaste Province, Costa Rica. It is located on the east shore of Lake Arenal. Nearby, to the north of the village are the Arenal Botanical Gardens.
