= San Miguel District, Cañas =

District in Cañas canton, Guanacaste province, Costa Rica

San Miguel
- District
- San Miguel district
- San Miguel district location in Costa Rica
- Coordinates: 10.3432867°N 85.0489915°W
- Country: Costa Rica
- Province: Guanacaste
- Canton: Cañas
- Creation: 30 November 1995

Area
  - Total: 120.86 km^{2} (46.66 sq mi)
- Elevation: 75 m (246 ft)

Population (2011)
  - Total: 1,644
  - Density: 13.60/km^{2} (35.23/sq mi)
- Time zone: UTC−06:00
- Postal code: 50603

San Miguel is a district of the Cañas canton, in the Guanacaste province of Costa Rica.

== History ==
San Miguel was created on 30 November 1995 by Decreto Ejecutivo 24809-G. Segregated from Cañas.

== Geography ==
San Miguel has an area of 120.86 km^{2} (46.66 sq mi) and an elevation of 75 metres.

== Villages ==
Administrative center of the district is the village of San Miguel.

Other villages in the district are Coco, Gotera, Güis, Higuerón, Higuerón Viejo and San Juan.

== Demographics ==
Historical population
Census	Pop.	±% p.a.
2000	1,520	—
2011	1,644	+0.72%
2022	2,690	+4.58%
Source: Instituto Nacional de Estadística y Censos; Centro Centroamericano de Población

For the 2011 census, San Miguel had a population of 1,644 inhabitants.

== Transportation ==
=== Road transportation ===
The district is covered by the following road routes:

- National Route 1
- National Route 925
- National Route 930
