= Carlos Utria =

Colombian professional boxer (born 2003)

Personal information
- Born: Carlos Alfonso Utria Lopez; 10 September 2003 (age 22) Soplaviento, Colombia
- Weight: Super-lightweight

Boxing career
- Stance: Orthodox

Boxing record
- Total fights: 15
- Wins: 15
- Win by KO: 11
Medal record
Representing Colombia
Men's boxing
Riyadh Season WBC Boxing Grand Prix
| Gold medal – first place | 2025 Riyadh | Super-lightweight |

Carlos Alfonso Utria Lopez (born 10 September 2003) is a Colombian professional boxer who competes in the super lightweight division. He is undefeated as a professional, won the 2025 WBC Boxing Grand Prix super-lightweight title, and was named 2025 Prospect of the Year by BoxingScene.

== Professional career ==
Utria fights as an orthodox boxer. He made his professional debut on 20 May 2023 in Barranquilla, scoring a first-round knockout victory over Alan Anaya. He followed with knockout wins against Carlos Quintero in June and Luis Diaz Marmol in August, then defeated Santiago Ochoa a month later, before closing the year with a first-round knockout of Hernan Perez.

On 7 June 2024, Utria won the WBA Fedecaribe super-lightweight title, defeating Robinson Garcia by first-round knockout. Two months later, he successfully defended his title, defeating Helber Rojas by second-round knockout.

=== WBC Boxing Grand Prix ===
In 2025, Utria represented Colombia in the 140lbs division of the WBC Boxing Grand Prix.

Round of 32

Utria defeated Elianel Guerrero of the Dominican Republic by technical knockout in the second round, scoring three knockdowns.

Round of 16

Utria faced Alan Crenz of Argentina and won by unanimous decision after six rounds.

Quarterfinal

Utria won a unanimous decision against Canadian boxer Spencer Wilcox, using his jab and combinations to control the fight.

Semifinal

Utria stopped South African boxer Ntethelelo Nkosi by technical knockout in the first round after landing clean power shots that forced the referee to intervene.

Final

Utria faced Mujibillo Tursunov in the final and won by unanimous decision, with the judges' scorecards reading 77–75, 77–75, 77–75, 78–74, and 78–74. The victory earned him the $100,000 first-place prize, the José Sulaimán Trophy, a top-10 ranking in the WBC's 140-pound division, and a guaranteed opportunity to challenge for the WBC Silver title.

On 22 August 2026 at the T-Mobile Arena in Paradise, Nevada, United States, Utria defeated Israel Mercado via split decision with two of the ringside judges scoring the fight 97–93 and 96–94 respectively in his favour, while the third had it 96–94 for his opponent.

== Professional boxing record ==
| 15 fights | 15 wins | 0 losses |
|---|---|---|
| By knockout | 11 | 0 |
| By decision | 4 | 0 |
| Draws | 0 | |

| No. | Result | Record | Opponent | Type | Round, time | Date | Location | Notes |
|---|---|---|---|---|---|---|---|---|
| 15 | Win | 15–0 | Israel Mercado | SD | 10 | 22 Aug 2026 | T-Mobile Arena, Paradise, Nevada, U.S | |
| 14 | Win | 14–0 | Mujibillo Tursunov | UD | 6 | 20 Dec 2025 | Global Theater Boulevard Riyadh City, Riyadh, Saudi Arabia | Won WBC Grand Prix – Super Lightweight Final |
| 13 | Win | 13–0 | Ntethelelo Nkosi | TKO | 1 (6) 1:38 | 19 Oct 2025 | Global Theater Boulevard Riyadh City, Riyadh, Saudi Arabia | WBC Grand Prix – Super Lightweight Semi-Finals |
| 12 | Win | 12–0 | Spencer Wilcox | UD | 6 | 13 Aug 2025 | Kingdom Arena, Riyadh, Saudi Arabia | WBC Grand Prix – Super Lightweight Quarterfinals |
| 11 | Win | 11–0 | Alan David Crenz | UD | 6 | 20 Jun 2025 | Cool Arena, Riyadh, Saudi Arabia | WBC Grand Prix – Super Lightweight Round of 16 |
| 10 | Win | 10–0 | Elianel Guerrero | TKO | 2 (6) 2:45 | 18 Apr 2025 | Global Theater Boulevard Riyadh City, Riyadh, Saudi Arabia | WBC Grand Prix – Super Lightweight Round of 32 |
| 9 | Win | 9–0 | Yonathan Mendoza | TKO | 1 (8) 2:21 | 18 Oct 2024 | Estadio de Softbol Horacio Guzman, Bayunca, Colombia | |
| 8 | Win | 8–0 | Jader Esquivia | KO | 1 (8) 2:41 | 27 Sep 2024 | Estadio de Softbol Adan Pereira, La Boquilla, Colombia | |
| 7 | Win | 7–0 | Helber Rojas | TKO | 2 (10) 1:39 | 3 Aug 2024 | San Onofre, Colombia | Defended WBA Fedecaribe super lightweight title |
| 6 | Win | 6–0 | Robinson Garcia | TKO | 1 (8) 2:52 | 7 Jun 2024 | Cancha La Pola, San Onofre, Sucre, Colombia | Won WBA Fedecaribe super-lightweight title |
| 5 | Win | 5–0 | Hernan Perez | KO | 1 (8) 2:59 | 16 Dec 2023 | Pista de Patinaje El Salitre, Bogotá, Colombia | |
| 4 | Win | 4–0 | Santiago Ochoa | KO | 1 (8) 2:27 | 23 Sep 2023 | Universidad Autónoma, Barranquilla, Colombia | |
| 3 | Win | 3–0 | Luis Diaz Marmol | TKO | 1 (6) 2:42 | 26 Aug 2023 | Barranquilla, Colombia | |
| 2 | Win | 2–0 | Carlos Quintero | KO | 1 (4) 1:55 | 25 Jun 2023 | Centro Recreacional Los Chiricocos, Arenal del Sur, Colombia | |
| 1 | Win | 1–0 | Alan Anaya | TKO | 1 (4) 1:37 | 20 May 2023 | Gimnasio Cuadrilatero, Barranquilla, Colombia | |
