= La Fortuna, Bagaces Cantón =

District in Bagaces canton, Guanacaste province, Costa Rica

La Fortuna
- District
- Interactive map of La Fortuna
- La Fortuna district location in Costa Rica
- Coordinates: 10.641037°N 85.1777178°W
- Country: Costa Rica
- Province: Guanacaste
- Canton: Bagaces
- Creation: 14 August 1968

Area
  - Total: 163.37 km^{2} (63.08 sq mi)
- Elevation: 430 m (1,410 ft)

Population (2011)
  - Total: 2,756
  - Density: 16.87/km^{2} (43.69/sq mi)
- Time zone: UTC−06:00
- Postal code: 50402

La Fortuna is a district of the Bagaces canton, in the Guanacaste province of Costa Rica.

== History ==
La Fortuna was created on 14 August 1968 by Decreto 29. Segregated from Bagaces.

== Geography ==
La Fortuna has an area of 163.37 km² and an elevation of 430 metres.

== Villages ==
Administrative center of the district is the town of La Fortuna.

Other villages are Casavieja (partly), Cuipilapa, Giganta, Hornillas, Macuá, Martillete, Mozotal, Pozo Azul, Sagrada Familia, San Bernardo, San Joaquín, Santa Fe, Santa Rosa and Unión Ferrer.

== Demographics ==
Historical population
Census	Pop.	±% p.a.
1973	2,786	—
1984	2,494	−1.00%
2000	2,828	+0.79%
2011	2,756	−0.23%
2022	2,310	−1.59%
Source: Instituto Nacional de Estadística y Censos; Centro Centroamericano de Población

For the 2011 census, La Fortuna had a population of 2,756 inhabitants.

== Transportation ==
=== Road transportation ===
The district is covered by the following road routes:

- National Route 165
