= Mogote (disambiguation) =

Mogote is a term referring to an isolated, steep-sided hill.

Mogote or Mogotes may also refer to:

- Mogote, Colorado, a community in the United States
- Mogote de Bagaces, also known as Guayabo de Bagaces, in Costa Rica
- Mogotes, a town and municipality in the Santander Department, Colombia
