= Tronadora =

District in Tilarán canton, Guanacaste province, Costa Rica

- District
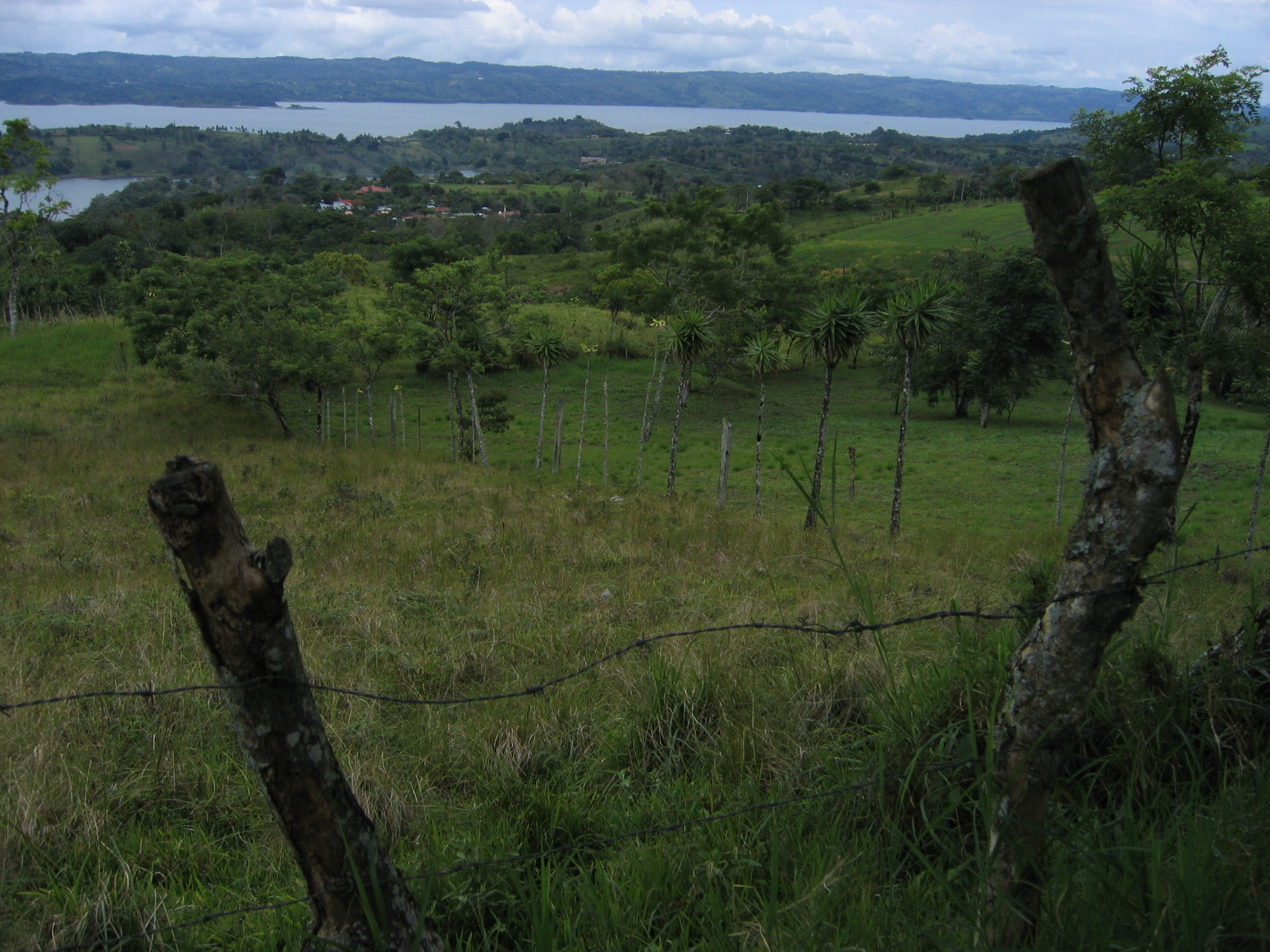
- Tronadora
- Tronadora district
- Tronadora district location in Costa Rica
- Coordinates: 10.4202973°N 84.8526241°W
- Country: Costa Rica
- Province: Guanacaste
- Canton: Tilarán

Area
  - Total: 142.28 km^{2} (54.93 sq mi)
- Elevation: 600 m (2,000 ft)

Population (2011)
  - Total: 1,795
  - Density: 12.62/km^{2} (32.68/sq mi)
- Time zone: UTC−06:00
- Postal code: 50803

Tronadora is a district of the Tilarán canton, in the Guanacaste province of Costa Rica. It is located on the west shore of Lake Arenal. It is connected by road to Tejona and Tilarán along Route 142. The weather is changeable due to the proximity of the confluence of the Pacific coast weather pattern and the inland lake weather pattern. It is drier and cooler than the Pacific coast due to the elevation of 614 meters (2014 feet).

== Geography ==
Tronadora has an area of 142.28 km^{2} (54.93 sq mi) and an elevation of 600 metres.

== Locations ==
- Poblados: Arenal Viejo, Colonia Menonita, Río Chiquito Abajo, Silencio

== Demographics ==
Historical population
Census	Pop.	±% p.a.
1927	734	—
1950	1,614	+3.49%
1963	2,565	+3.63%
1973	2,623	+0.22%
1984	1,505	−4.92%
2000	1,745	+0.93%
2011	1,795	+0.26%
2022	2,079	+1.34%
Source: Instituto Nacional de Estadística y Censos; Centro Centroamericano de Población

For the 2011 census, Tronadora had a population of 1,795 inhabitants.

== Transportation ==
=== Road transportation ===
The district is covered by the following road routes:

- National Route 926
- National Route 936
