= El Arenal =

El Arenal may refer to the following places:

== Argentina ==
- El Arenal, Santiago del Estero, a municipality and village in Santiago del Estero

== Mexico ==
- El Arenal, Hidalgo, a town and municipality in the state of Hidalgo
- El Arenal, Jalisco, a town and municipality in the state of Jalisco

== Nicaragua ==
- El Arenal Natural Reserve, a natural reserve in the Matagalpa department

== Spain ==
- El Arenal, Ávila, a municipality in the province of Ávila, Castile and León
- El Arenal, Seville, a neighbourhood in the municipality of Seville, Andalusia
- s'Arenal, coastal area in Mallorca, Balearic Islands

== See also ==
- Arenal (disambiguation)
