= Porozal =

District in Cañas canton, Guanacaste province, Costa Rica

- District
- Porozal district
- Porozal district location in Costa Rica
- Coordinates: 10.2685301°N 85.1748724°W
- Country: Costa Rica
- Province: Guanacaste
- Canton: Cañas
- Creation: 30 November 1995

Area
  - Total: 105.23 km^{2} (40.63 sq mi)
- Elevation: 35 m (115 ft)

Population (2011)
  - Total: 669
  - Density: 6.36/km^{2} (16.5/sq mi)
- Time zone: UTC−06:00
- Postal code: 50605

Porozal is a district of the Cañas canton, in the Guanacaste province of Costa Rica.

== History ==
Porozal was created on 30 November 1995 by Decreto Ejecutivo 24809-G. Segregated from Cañas.

== Geography ==
Porozal has an area of 105.23 square kilometres (40.63 sq mi) and an elevation of 35 metres (115 ft).

== Villages ==
Administrative center of the district is the village of Porozal.

Other villages in the district Brisas, Eskameca, Guapinol, Pozas, Puerto Alegre, Quesera, Santa Lucía, Taboga (partly) and Tiquirusas.

== Demographics ==
Historical population
| Census | Pop. | ±% p.a. |
|---|---|---|
| 2000 | 719 | — |
| 2011 | 669 | −0.65% |
| 2022 | 862 | +2.33% |
Source: Instituto Nacional de Estadística y Censos; Centro Centroamericano de Población

For the 2011 census, Porozal had a population of 669 inhabitants.

== Transportation ==
=== Road transportation ===
The district is covered by the following road routes:

- National Route 18
