= Arenal District =

Arenal District may refer to:

- Arenal District, Paita, in Paita province, Piura region, Peru
- Arenal District, Tilarán, in Tilarán Canton, Guanacaste province, Costa Rica
