= Palmira District, Cañas =

District in Cañas canton, Guanacaste province, Costa Rica

Palmira
- District
- Palmira district
- Palmira district location in Costa Rica
- Coordinates: 10.5931497°N 85.0875834°W
- Country: Costa Rica
- Province: Guanacaste
- Canton: Cañas
- Creation: 30 November 1995

Area
  - Total: 203.96 km^{2} (78.75 sq mi)
- Elevation: 225 m (738 ft)

Population (2011)
  - Total: 988
  - Density: 4.84/km^{2} (12.5/sq mi)
- Time zone: UTC−06:00
- Postal code: 50602

Palmira is a district of the Cañas canton, in the Guanacaste province of Costa Rica.

== History ==
Palmira was created on 30 November 1995 by Decreto Ejecutivo 24809-G. Segregated from Cañas.

== Geography ==
Palmira has an area of 203.96 km^{2} (78.75 sq mi) and an elevation of 225 metres.

== Villages ==
Administrative center of the district is the village of Palmira.

Other villages in the district are Aguacaliente, Paraíso (partly), San Isidro (partly), Santa Lucía (partly) and Tenorio.

== Demographics ==
Historical population
Census	Pop.	±% p.a.
2000	916	—
2011	988	+0.69%
2022	1,802	+5.62%
Source: Instituto Nacional de Estadística y Censos; Centro Centroamericano de Población

For the 2011 census, Palmira had a population of 988 inhabitants.

== Transportation ==
=== Road transportation ===
The district is covered by the following road routes:

- National Route 6
- National Route 927
