= Tilarán =

Town and district in Tilarán canton, Costa Rica

- Town and district
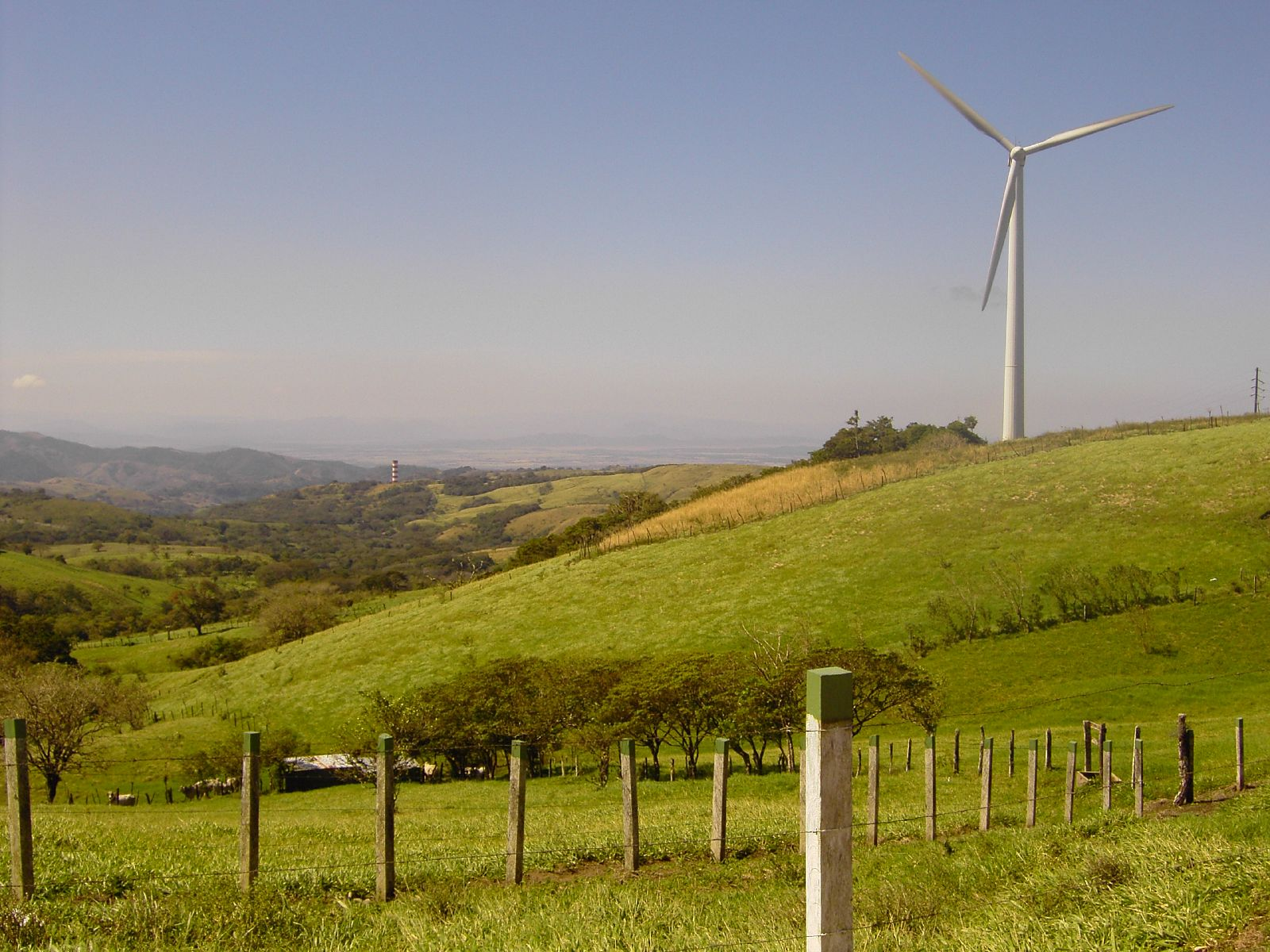
- Wind turbine in Tilarán
- Tilarán
- Tilarán town location in Costa Rica
- Coordinates: 10.470932°N 84.967445°W
- Country: Costa Rica
- Province: Guanacaste
- Canton: Tilarán

Area
  - Total: 139.43 km^{2} (53.83 sq mi)
- Elevation: 564 m (1,850 ft)

Population (2011)
  - Total: 8,677
  - Density: 62.23/km^{2} (161.2/sq mi)
- Time zone: UTC−06:00
- Postal code: 50801

Tilarán is a small town and a district in Guanacaste Province in Costa Rica. It is the seat of the Tilarán Canton located in the hills overlooking the west shore of Lake Arenal. It is connected by road to El Silencio, and by the 142 road down through the Cordillera de Tilarán hills to Tejona. The area between Tilaran and Tejona is one of the most important wind farms in Costa Rica and turbines are prominent on the landscape. Animal husbandry also forms an important part of the local economy.

== Geography ==
Tilarán has an area of 139.43 km^{2} (53.83 sq mi) and an elevation of 564 metres.

== Locations ==
- Barrios: Cabra, Carmen, Juan XXIII, Lomalinda
- Poblados: Cuatro Esquinas, Chiripa, Piamonte, Río Chiquito, San Luis, Tejona, Tres Esquinas

== Demographics ==
Historical population
Census	Pop.	±% p.a.
1927	1,239	—
1950	1,922	+1.93%
1963	3,426	+4.55%
1973	4,601	+2.99%
1984	5,926	+2.33%
2000	7,706	+1.66%
2011	8,677	+1.08%
2022	9,419	+0.75%
Source: Instituto Nacional de Estadística y Censos; Centro Centroamericano de Población

For the 2011 census, Tilarán had a population of 8,677 inhabitants. The main religion is Roman Catholicism and the town lies at the center of the Roman Catholic Diocese of Tilarán.

== Transportation ==
=== Road transportation ===
The district is covered by the following road routes:

- National Route 142
- National Route 145
- National Route 925
- National Route 926

It is connected by road to El Silencio, and via the 142 road down through the Cordillera de Tilarán hills to Tejona.

== Economy ==
The area between Tilaran and Tejona is one of the most important wind farms in Costa Rica and turbines are prominent on the landscape. Animal husbandry also forms an important part of the local economy.

== Notable people ==
- Doris Murillo Boniche – Local artist, retired art professor.
- Leonidas Flores – retired footballer
- Carlos Palacios Herrera – Professional cyclist
- Luis Esteban Herrera – Pianist
- Mark List – Driver on the Monster Jam circuit
- Danadith Tayals – Poet
- Manuel Vargas – Sculptor
