= Bebedero District =

District in Cañas canton, Guanacaste province, Costa Rica

Bebedero
- District
- Interactive map of Bebedero
- Bebedero district location in Costa Rica
- Coordinates: 10.3762283°N 85.1549199°W
- Country: Costa Rica
- Province: Guanacaste
- Canton: Cañas
- Creation: 30 November 1995

Area
  - Total: 58.26 km^{2} (22.49 sq mi)
- Elevation: 7 m (23 ft)

Population (2011)
  - Total: 2,084
  - Density: 35.77/km^{2} (92.65/sq mi)
- Time zone: UTC−06:00
- Postal code: 50604

Bebedero is a district of the Cañas canton, in the Guanacaste province of Costa Rica.

== History ==
Bebedero was created on 30 November 1995 by Decreto Ejecutivo 24809-G. Segregated from Cañas.

== Geography ==
Bebedero has an area of 58.26 km^{2} and an elevation of 7 metres.

== Villages ==
Administrative center of the district is the village of Bebedero.

Other villages in the district are Coopetaboga and Taboga (partly).

== Demographics ==
Historical population
Census	Pop.	±% p.a.
1883	47	—
1892	163	+14.82%
2000	2,123	+2.41%
2011	2,084	−0.17%
2022	2,760	+2.59%
Source: Instituto Nacional de Estadística y Censos; Centro Centroamericano de Población

For the 2011 census, Bebedero had a population of 2,084 inhabitants.

== Transportation ==
=== Road transportation ===
The district is covered by the following road routes:

- National Route 923
- National Route 930
