= Mogote de Bagaces =

District in Bagaces canton, Guanacaste province, Costa Rica

Mogote
- District
- Interactive map of Mogote
- Mogote district location in Costa Rica
- Coordinates: 10.7031304°N 85.273107°W
- Country: Costa Rica
- Province: Guanacaste
- Canton: Bagaces
- Creation: 26 November 1971

Area
  - Total: 181.79 km^{2} (70.19 sq mi)
- Elevation: 550 m (1,800 ft)

Population (2011)
  - Total: 3,398
  - Density: 18.69/km^{2} (48.41/sq mi)
- Time zone: UTC−06:00
- Postal code: 50403

Mogote is a district of the Bagaces canton in the Guanacaste province of Costa Rica.

== History ==
Mogote was created on 26 November 1971 by Decreto Ejecutivo 2077-G. It was segregated from Bagaces.

== Geography ==
Mogote has an area of 181.79 km² and an elevation of 550 metres.

== Villages ==
The town of Guayabo is the administrative center of the district.

Other villages include Barro de Olla, Horcones, La Ese, Limonal, Manglar, Mochadero, Pueblo Nuevo, Rincón de La Cruz, San Isidro de Limonal, San Jorge, San Pedro, and Torno.

== Demographics ==
Historical population
Census	Pop.	±% p.a.
1973	2,175	—
1984	1,700	−2.22%
2000	2,886	+3.36%
2011	3,398	+1.50%
2022	4,337	+2.24%
Source: Instituto Nacional de Estadística y Censos; Centro Centroamericano de Población

For the 2011 census, Mogote had a population of 3,398 inhabitants.

== Transportation ==
=== Road transportation ===
The district is covered by the following road routes:

- National Route 164
- National Route 165

== Economy ==
The economic activity of Mogote is based on agriculture (kidney beans, onions, and sugarcane), and on livestock and dairy industry.

Thanks to the energy-producing potential of the Miravalles, the Instituto Costarricense de Electricidad (ICE) started a geothermal project in the region, which brought employment opportunities. Something new in this area is the Eolic Power; more than 25 wind turbines were installed.

Nowadays, the area's commerce and tourism industries have developed rapidly, taking advantage of the potential offered by the use of thermal waters, horseback riding, and canopy tours.
