= Río Naranjo District =

District in Bagaces canton, Guanacaste province, Costa Rica

Río Naranjo
- District
- Río Naranjo district
- Río Naranjo district location in Costa Rica
- Coordinates: 10.6632056°N 85.0986061°W
- Country: Costa Rica
- Province: Guanacaste
- Canton: Bagaces
- Creation: 27 April 1995

Area
  - Total: 43.83 km^{2} (16.92 sq mi)
- Elevation: 522 m (1,713 ft)

Population (2011)
  - Total: 1,015
  - Density: 23.16/km^{2} (59.98/sq mi)
- Time zone: UTC−06:00
- Postal code: 50404

Río Naranjo is a district of the Bagaces canton, in the Guanacaste province of Costa Rica.

== History ==
Río Naranjo was created on 27 April 1995 by Decreto Ejecutivo 24286-G.

== Geography ==
Río Naranjo has an area of 43.83 km^{2} and an elevation of 522 metres.

== Villages ==
The town of Río Naranjo is the administrative center of the district. The only other village is Río Chiquito.

== Demographics ==
Historical population
Census	Pop.	±% p.a.
2000	997	—
2011	1,015	+0.16%
2022	1,204	+1.56%
Source: Instituto Nacional de Estadística y Censos; Centro Centroamericano de Población

For the 2011 census, Río Naranjo had a population of 1,015 inhabitants.

== Transportation ==
=== Road transportation ===
The district is covered by the following road routes:

- National Route 6
