= Geography of Costa Rica =

- Continent: Americas
- Region: Central America
- Coordinates: 9°56′N 84°5′W
- Area: Ranked 126th
  - Total: 51,179.92 km^{2} (19,760.68 sq mi)
  - Land: 99.02%
  - Water: 0.98%
- Coastline: 1,290 km (800 mi)
- Borders: total: 661 km (411 mi)
- Highest point: Mount Chirripó; 3,821 metres (12,536 ft)
- Lowest point: Pacific Ocean; 0 m
- Longest river: Térraba River (fully inland); 160 km (99 mi)
- Largest lake: Lake Arenal; 85 km^{2} (33 mi^{2})
- Exclusive economic zone: 574,725 km^{2} (221,903 mi^{2})

Costa Rica is located on the Central American Isthmus, surrounding the point 10° north of the equator and 84° west of the prime meridian. It has 212 km of Caribbean Sea coastline and 1,016 on the North Pacific Ocean.

The area of Costa Rica, including its islands, covers 51,179.92 km^{2} (19,760.68 sq mi) of which 40 km^{2} (15 sq mi) is water. It is slightly smaller than Bosnia and Herzegovina.

== Geology ==
Costa Rica is located on the Caribbean Plate. It borders the Cocos Plate in the Pacific Ocean which is being subducted beneath it. This forms the volcanoes in Costa Rica, also known as the Central America Volcanic Arc.

The Caribbean Plate began its eastward migration during the Late Cretaceous. During the Late Paleocene, a local sea-level low-stand assisted by the continental uplift of the western margin of South America, resulted in a land bridge over which several groups of mammals apparently took part in an interchange.

Many earthquakes in Costa Rica have occurred.

== Political and human geography ==
Costa Rica shares a 313-kilometre (194-mile) border with Nicaragua to the north, and a 348-km border with Panama to the south.

Costa Rica claims an exclusive economic zone of 574,725 km^{2} (221,903 mi^{2}) with 200 nautical miles (370.4 km; 230.2 mi) and a territorial sea of 12 nautical miles (22.2 km; 13.8 mi).

Land use: Arable land: 4.8%. Permanent crops: 6.66%. Other: 88.54%.

Administrative divisions of Costa Rica include 7 provinces, 82 cantons, and 478 districts. There are also 24 indigenous territories.

== Physical geography ==
=== Islands ===
There are about 79 islands of Costa Rica, the most remote being Cocos Island and the largest being Isla Calero.

=== Mountain ranges ===
The nation's coastal plain is separated by the Cordillera Central and the Cordillera de Talamanca, which form the spine of the country and separate the Pacific and Caribbean drainage divides.

The Cordillera de Guanacaste is in the north near the border with Nicaragua and forms part of the Continental Divide of the Americas.

Much of the Cordillera de Talamanca is included in the La Amistad International Park, which is shared between Costa Rica and Panama. It contains the country's highest peaks: the Cerro Chirripó and the Cerro Kamuk. Much of the region is covered by the Talamancan montane forests. It also includes the Cerros de Escazú which borders the Costa Rican Central Valley to the south.

=== Hydrology ===
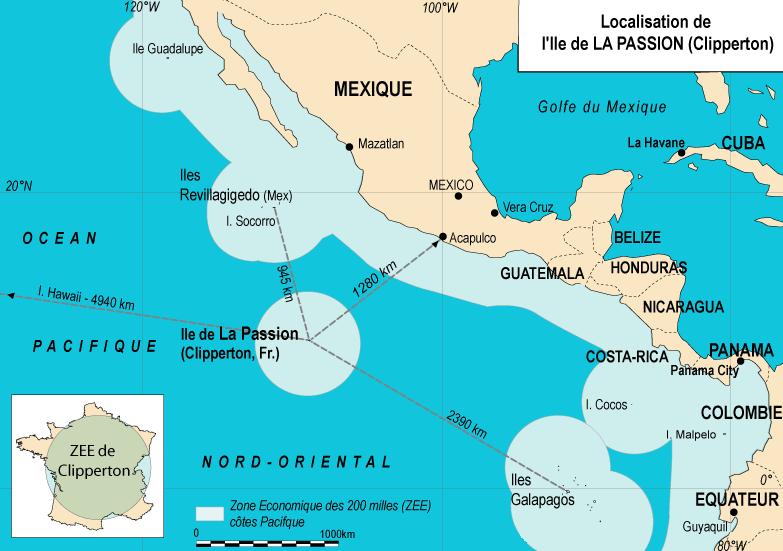
Extent of Costa Rica's western EEZ in the Pacific

Interrogate land covers 1,031 km^{2}. Rivers of Costa Rica all drain into the Caribbean or the Pacific.

=== Extreme points ===
Cocos Island is the southwestern extreme of the country. Otherwise to the north it's Peñas Blancas, to the south and east one of manyPanama border, and to the west the Santa Elena Peninsula.

The lowest point is sea level and the tallest is Cerro Chirripó at 3,821 m (12,536 ft).

== Climate ==
Costa Rica map of Köppen climate classification

The climate is tropical. Hot season (December to April); rainy season (May to November); cooler in highlands.

Because Costa Rica is located between 8 and 12 degrees north of the Equator, the climate is tropical year round. However, the country has many microclimates depending on elevation, rainfall, topography, and by the geography of each particular region.

Costa Rica's seasons are defined by how much rain falls during a particular period. The year can be split into two periods, the dry season known to the residents as summer (verano), and the rainy season, known locally as winter (invierno). The "summer" or dry season goes from December to April, and "winter" or rainy season goes from May to November, which almost coincides with the Atlantic hurricane season, and during this time, it rains constantly in some regions.

The location receiving the most rain is the Caribbean slopes of the Cordillera Central mountains, with an annual rainfall of over 5,000 mm (196.9 in). Humidity is also higher on the Caribbean side than on the Pacific side. The mean annual temperature on the coastal lowlands is around 27 °C (81 °F), 20 °C (68 °F) in the main populated areas of the Cordillera Central, and below 10 °C (50 °F) on the summits of the highest mountains.

Climate data for Costa Rica
Month	Jan	Feb	Mar	Apr	May	Jun	Jul	Aug	Sep	Oct	Nov	Dec	Year
Mean daily maximum °C (°F)	27 (81)	27 (81)	28 (82)	28 (82)	27 (81)	27 (81)	27 (81)	27 (81)	26 (79)	26 (79)	26 (79)	26 (79)	27 (81)
Mean daily minimum °C (°F)	17 (63)	18 (64)	18 (64)	18 (64)	18 (64)	18 (64)	18 (64)	18 (64)	17 (63)	18 (64)	18 (64)	18 (64)	18 (64)
Average precipitation mm (inches)	6.3 (0.25)	10.2 (0.40)	13.8 (0.54)	79.9 (3.15)	267.6 (10.54)	280.1 (11.03)	181.5 (7.15)	276.9 (10.90)	355.1 (13.98)	330.6 (13.02)	135.5 (5.33)	33.5 (1.32)	1,971 (77.61)
Percentage possible sunshine	40	37	39	33	25	20	21	22	20	22	25	34	28

Climate data for San José, Costa Rica (Juan Santamaría International Airport)
Month	Jan	Feb	Mar	Apr	May	Jun	Jul	Aug	Sep	Oct	Nov	Dec	Year
Record high °C (°F)	31.5 (88.7)	33.3 (91.9)	33.4 (92.1)	34.5 (94.1)	32.8 (91.0)	32.1 (89.8)	31.7 (89.1)	32.0 (89.6)	32.0 (89.6)	31.4 (88.5)	30.3 (86.5)	31.5 (88.7)	34.5 (94.1)
Mean daily maximum °C (°F)	28.2 (82.8)	29.1 (84.4)	29.9 (85.8)	30.3 (86.5)	28.8 (83.8)	28.2 (82.8)	28.2 (82.8)	28.3 (82.9)	27.8 (82.0)	27.1 (80.8)	27.2 (81.0)	27.9 (82.2)	28.4 (83.1)
Daily mean °C (°F)	22.6 (72.7)	23.0 (73.4)	23.5 (74.3)	23.7 (74.7)	22.9 (73.2)	22.5 (72.5)	22.6 (72.7)	22.4 (72.3)	22.0 (71.6)	21.8 (71.2)	21.9 (71.4)	22.3 (72.1)	22.6 (72.7)
Mean daily minimum °C (°F)	18.5 (65.3)	18.7 (65.7)	18.8 (65.8)	19.1 (66.4)	19.2 (66.6)	19.0 (66.2)	19.0 (66.2)	18.8 (65.8)	18.3 (64.9)	18.5 (65.3)	18.3 (64.9)	18.3 (64.9)	18.7 (65.7)
Record low °C (°F)	11.7 (53.1)	5 (41)	8 (46)	14.9 (58.8)	14.9 (58.8)	15.8 (60.4)	11 (52)	16.0 (60.8)	15.8 (60.4)	15.5 (59.9)	9 (48)	2 (36)	2 (36)
Average rainfall mm (inches)	6.3 (0.25)	10.2 (0.40)	13.8 (0.54)	79.9 (3.15)	267.6 (10.54)	280.1 (11.03)	181.5 (7.15)	276.9 (10.90)	355.1 (13.98)	330.6 (13.02)	135.5 (5.33)	33.5 (1.32)	1,971 (77.61)
Average rainy days (≥ 0.1 mm)	3	3	5	10	23	22	20	22	26	25	17	8	184
Average relative humidity (%)	68	68	66	70	77	83	80	83	85	87	79	74	77
Mean monthly sunshine hours	285.2	266.0	282.1	240.0	182.9	144.0	151.9	158.1	147.0	161.2	177.0	244.9	2,440.3
Source 1: Deutscher Wetterdienst
Source 2: NOAA (sun 1961–1990)

Climate data for Limón International Airport, Costa Rica
Month	Jan	Feb	Mar	Apr	May	Jun	Jul	Aug	Sep	Oct	Nov	Dec	Year
Record high °C (°F)	32.9 (91.2)	33.4 (92.1)	33.9 (93.0)	34.5 (94.1)	35.0 (95.0)	35.0 (95.0)	33.7 (92.7)	34.3 (93.7)	33.8 (92.8)	34.5 (94.1)	34.5 (94.1)	33.0 (91.4)	35.0 (95.0)
Mean daily maximum °C (°F)	28.8 (83.8)	29.1 (84.4)	29.7 (85.5)	30.1 (86.2)	30.4 (86.7)	30.3 (86.5)	29.6 (85.3)	30.1 (86.2)	30.6 (87.1)	30.4 (86.7)	29.4 (84.9)	28.9 (84.0)	29.8 (85.6)
Daily mean °C (°F)	24.8 (76.6)	24.9 (76.8)	25.5 (77.9)	26.1 (79.0)	26.6 (79.9)	26.6 (79.9)	26.1 (79.0)	26.3 (79.3)	26.6 (79.9)	26.4 (79.5)	25.7 (78.3)	25.1 (77.2)	25.9 (78.6)
Mean daily minimum °C (°F)	20.7 (69.3)	20.7 (69.3)	21.2 (70.2)	22.0 (71.6)	22.8 (73.0)	22.9 (73.2)	22.6 (72.7)	22.5 (72.5)	22.5 (72.5)	22.3 (72.1)	21.9 (71.4)	21.2 (70.2)	21.9 (71.5)
Record low °C (°F)	12.9 (55.2)	16.4 (61.5)	15.2 (59.4)	17.4 (63.3)	17.8 (64.0)	20.0 (68.0)	16.6 (61.9)	19.0 (66.2)	18.9 (66.0)	19.2 (66.6)	15.8 (60.4)	13.2 (55.8)	12.9 (55.2)
Average rainfall mm (inches)	319.7 (12.59)	237.3 (9.34)	208.5 (8.21)	263.0 (10.35)	333.5 (13.13)	289.0 (11.38)	426.3 (16.78)	303.2 (11.94)	142.1 (5.59)	207.1 (8.15)	400.6 (15.77)	445.0 (17.52)	3,575.3 (140.75)
Average rainy days (≥ 1.0 mm)	17	14	14	14	16	16	20	16	11	13	17	18	186
Average relative humidity (%)	87	86	85	85	87	87	89	87	86	87	88	88	87
Mean monthly sunshine hours	155	152.6	179.8	171	164.3	135	117.8	145.7	159	164.3	135	142.6	1,822.1
Mean daily sunshine hours	5.0	5.4	5.8	5.7	5.3	4.5	3.8	4.7	5.3	5.3	4.5	4.6	5.0
Source 1: Instituto Meteorologico Nacional (precipitation 1941–2012, temperatures 1970–2012, sun 1969–2012, humidity 1970–2012)
Source 2: Meteo Climat (extremes, 1941–present)

Climate data for Liberia, Costa Rica
Month	Jan	Feb	Mar	Apr	May	Jun	Jul	Aug	Sep	Oct	Nov	Dec	Year
Mean daily maximum °C (°F)	33.4 (92.1)	34.4 (93.9)	35.4 (95.7)	35.9 (96.6)	33.9 (93.0)	32.0 (89.6)	32.1 (89.8)	32.1 (89.8)	31.3 (88.3)	30.9 (87.6)	31.6 (88.9)	32.5 (90.5)	33.0 (91.4)
Daily mean °C (°F)	25.8 (78.4)	26.7 (80.1)	27.3 (81.1)	28.5 (83.3)	28.7 (83.7)	28.0 (82.4)	27.6 (81.7)	27.0 (80.6)	27.2 (81.0)	27.0 (80.6)	26.2 (79.2)	25.7 (78.3)	27.1 (80.8)
Mean daily minimum °C (°F)	20.7 (69.3)	21.1 (70.0)	21.6 (70.9)	22.7 (72.9)	23.4 (74.1)	23.2 (73.8)	22.8 (73.0)	22.6 (72.7)	22.4 (72.3)	22.3 (72.1)	21.5 (70.7)	21.0 (69.8)	22.1 (71.8)
Average rainfall mm (inches)	1.3 (0.05)	1.6 (0.06)	4.1 (0.16)	23.9 (0.94)	194.1 (7.64)	245.6 (9.67)	153.3 (6.04)	209.4 (8.24)	346.3 (13.63)	310.0 (12.20)	98.2 (3.87)	12.3 (0.48)	1,600.1 (62.98)
Average rainy days (≥ 1.0 mm)	0	0	0	1	9	14	10	12	17	16	6	2	87
Average relative humidity (%)	65.3	62.2	60.5	62.0	73.2	81.9	78.4	80.9	85.4	86.1	80.4	72.1	74.0
Mean monthly sunshine hours	297.6	276.9	303.8	267.0	204.6	168.0	186.0	182.9	159.0	170.5	204.0	260.4	2,680.7
Mean daily sunshine hours	9.6	9.8	9.8	8.9	6.6	5.6	6.0	5.9	5.3	5.5	6.8	8.4	7.4
Source: Instituto Meteorologico Nacional (precipitation 1957–2012, temperatures 1977–2013, sun 1976–2012, humidity 1976–2013)

=== Climate change ===
Costa Rica is highly vulnerable to extreme weather events, which can be exacerbated by climate change. The majority of Costa Rica's population (78%) and economic activity (80% of GDP) are concentrated in regions highly vulnerable to various natural hazards, such as floods, landslides, cyclones, storm surges, and rising sea levels. Sea levels are rising along both of Costa Rica's coasts, increasing the vulnerability of low-lying areas to storm surges and erosion with consequences for fisheries, port infrastructure and tourism.

The country is facing increasing temperatures (especially at higher elevations), and changing rainfall patterns resulting in increased risk of drought along the Pacific slope and flooding in all regions of the country. Increasing temperatures and extreme heat will have major consequences for human health, agriculture (particularly coffee and banana cultivation), water security, tourism, and the country's distinctive biodiversity and ecosystems.

Costa Rica has committed to reducing its greenhouse gas emissions by 9.11 MtCO2e by 2030 and net zero by 2050, announced in its National Decarbonisation Plan (NDP). According to Climate Action Tracker, Costa Rica has made good progress toward its climate goals.

== Flora and fauna ==
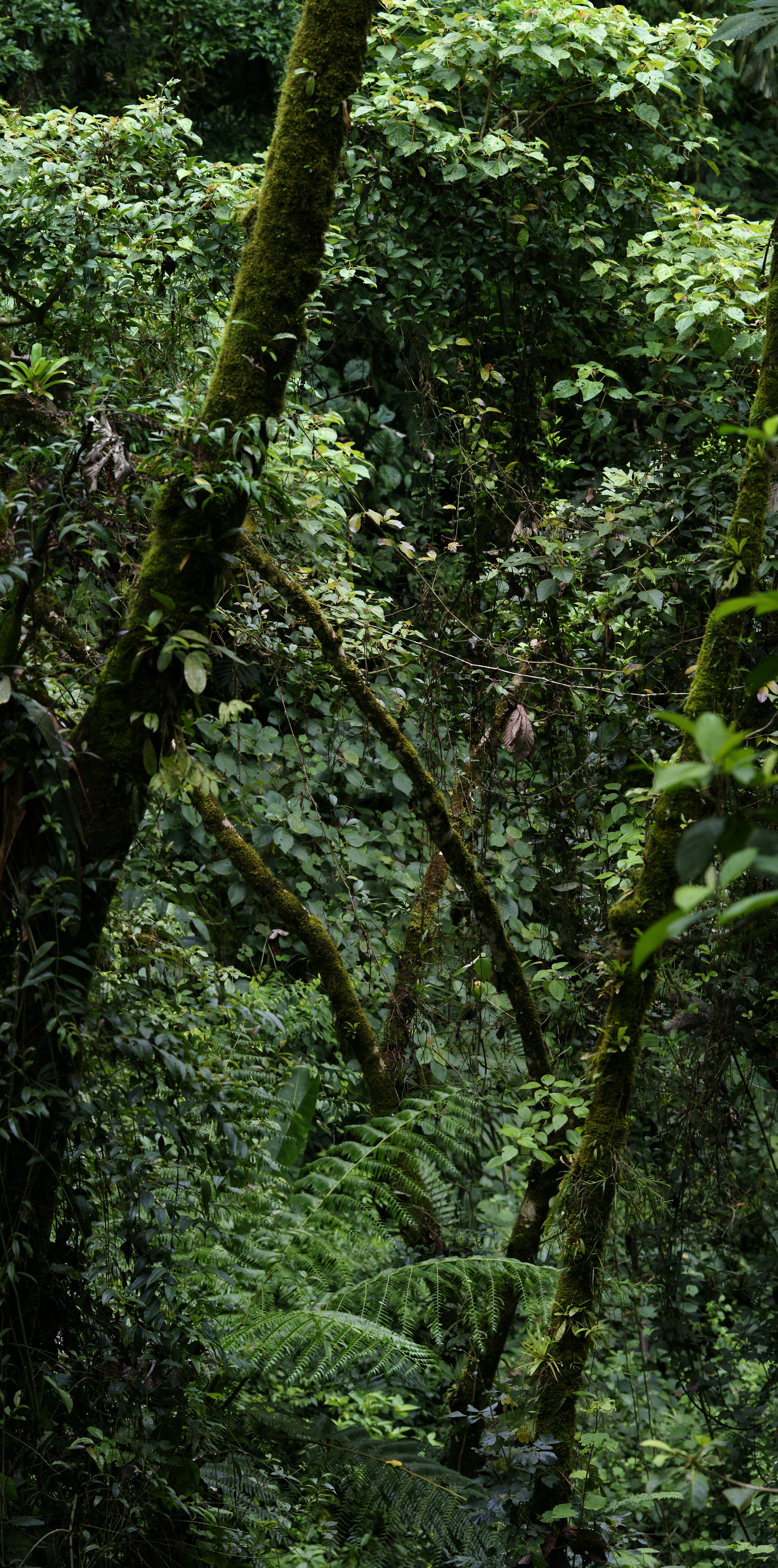
Rainforest in Costa Rica

Costa Rica is a biodiversity hotspot. While the country has only about 0.03% of the world's landmass, it contains 5% of the world's biodiversity. It is home to about 12,119 species of plants, of which 950 are endemic. There are 117 native trees and more than 1,400 types of orchids; a third of them can be found in the Monteverde Cloud Forest Reserve. Almost a half of the country's land is covered by forests, though only 3.5% is covered by primary forests. Deforestation in Costa Rica has been reduced from some of the worst rates in the world from 1973 to 1989, to almost zero by 2005.

The diversity of wildlife in Costa Rica is very high; there are 441 species of amphibians and reptiles, 838 species of birds, 232 species of mammals and 181 species of fresh water fish. Costa Rica has high levels of endemism; 81 species of amphibians and reptiles, 17 species of birds and 7 species of mammals are endemic to the country. However, many species are endangered. According to the World Conservation Monitoring Centre, 209 species of birds, mammals, reptiles, amphibians and plants are endangered. Some of the country's most endangered species are the harpy eagle, the giant anteater, the golden toad, and the jaguar. The International Union for Conservation of Nature (IUCN) reports the golden toad as extinct.

Over 25% of Costa Rica's national territory is protected by the National System of Conservation Areas (SINAC), which oversees all of the country's protected areas. There 29 national parks of Costa Rica many conservation areas of Costa Rica. Together protected areas comprise over one-fourth of Costa Rican territory. 9.3% of the country is protected under IUCN categories I-V. Around 25% of the country's land area is in protected national parks and protected areas, the largest percentage of protected areas in the world (developing world average 13%, developed world average 8%).

Tortuguero National Park is home to monkeys, sloths, birds, and a variety of reptiles.

The Monteverde Cloud Forest Reserve is home to about 2,000 plant species, including numerous orchids. Over 400 types of birds and more than 100 species of mammals can be found there.

Over 840 species of birds have been identified in Costa Rica. As is the case in much of Central America, the avian species in Costa Rica are a mix of North and South American species. The country's abundant fruit trees, many of which bear fruit year round, are hugely important to the birds, some of whom survive on diets that consist only of one or two types of fruit. Some of the country's most notable avian species include the resplendent quetzal, scarlet macaw, three-wattled bellbird, bare-necked umbrellabird, and the keel-billed toucan. The Instituto Nacional de Biodiversidad is allowed to collect royalties on any biological discoveries of medical importance. Costa Rica is a center of biological diversity for reptiles and amphibians, including the world's fastest running lizard, the spiny-tailed iguana (Ctenosaura similis).

== Natural resources ==
Hydropower is produced from Lake Arenal, the largest lake in Costa Rica. Total renewable water resources is 112.4 km^{3}.

Freshwater withdrawal is 5.77 km^{3}/year (15%/9%/77%), or per capita: 1,582 m^{3}/year. Agriculture is the largest water user demanding around 53% of total supplies while the sector contributes 6.5% to the Costa Rica GDP. Both total and per capita water usage is very high in comparison to other Central American countries but when measured against available freshwater sources, Costa Rica uses only 5% of its available supply.

Increasing urbanization will put pressure on water resources management in Costa Rica.

== Gallery ==
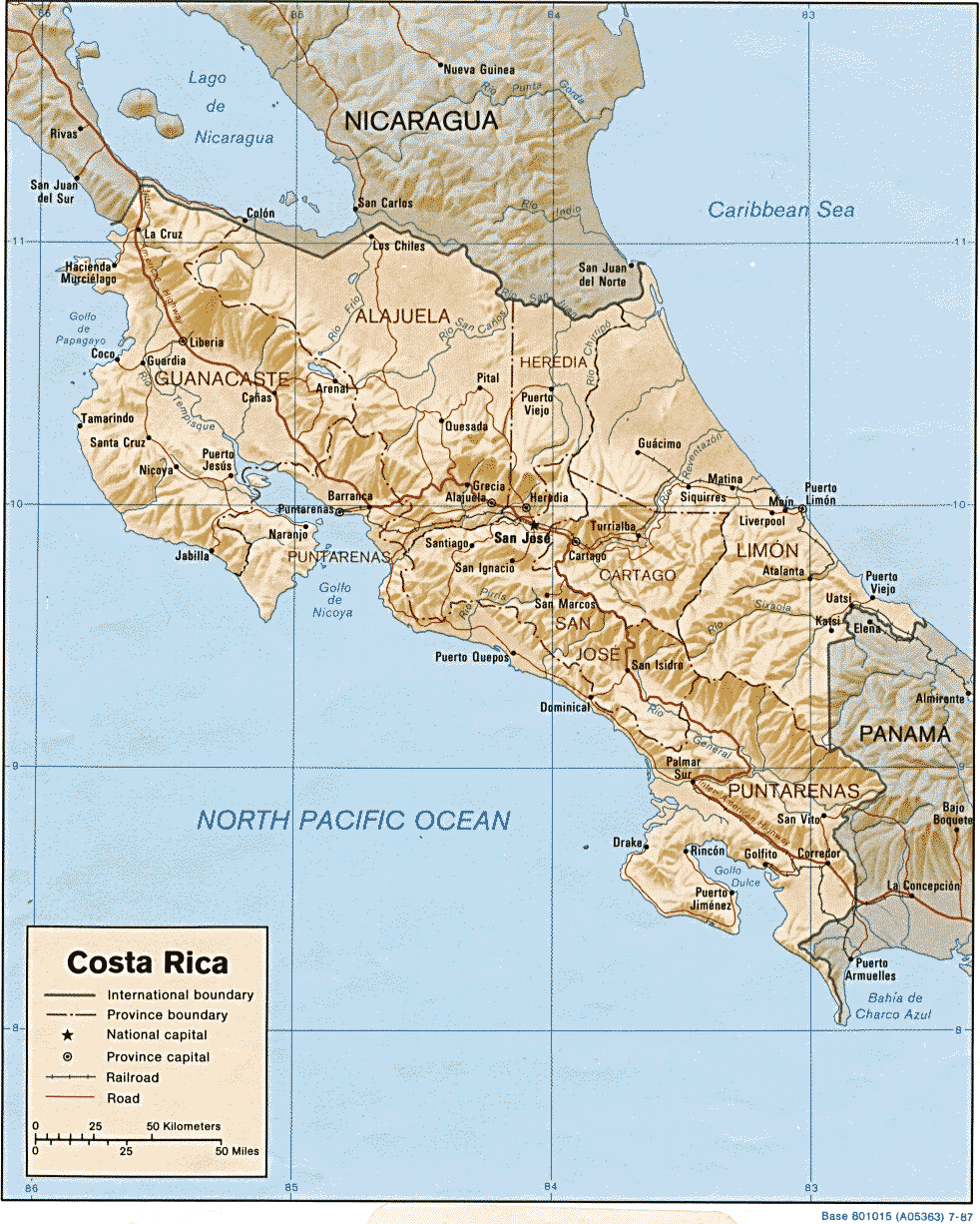
Shaded relief map of Costa Rica

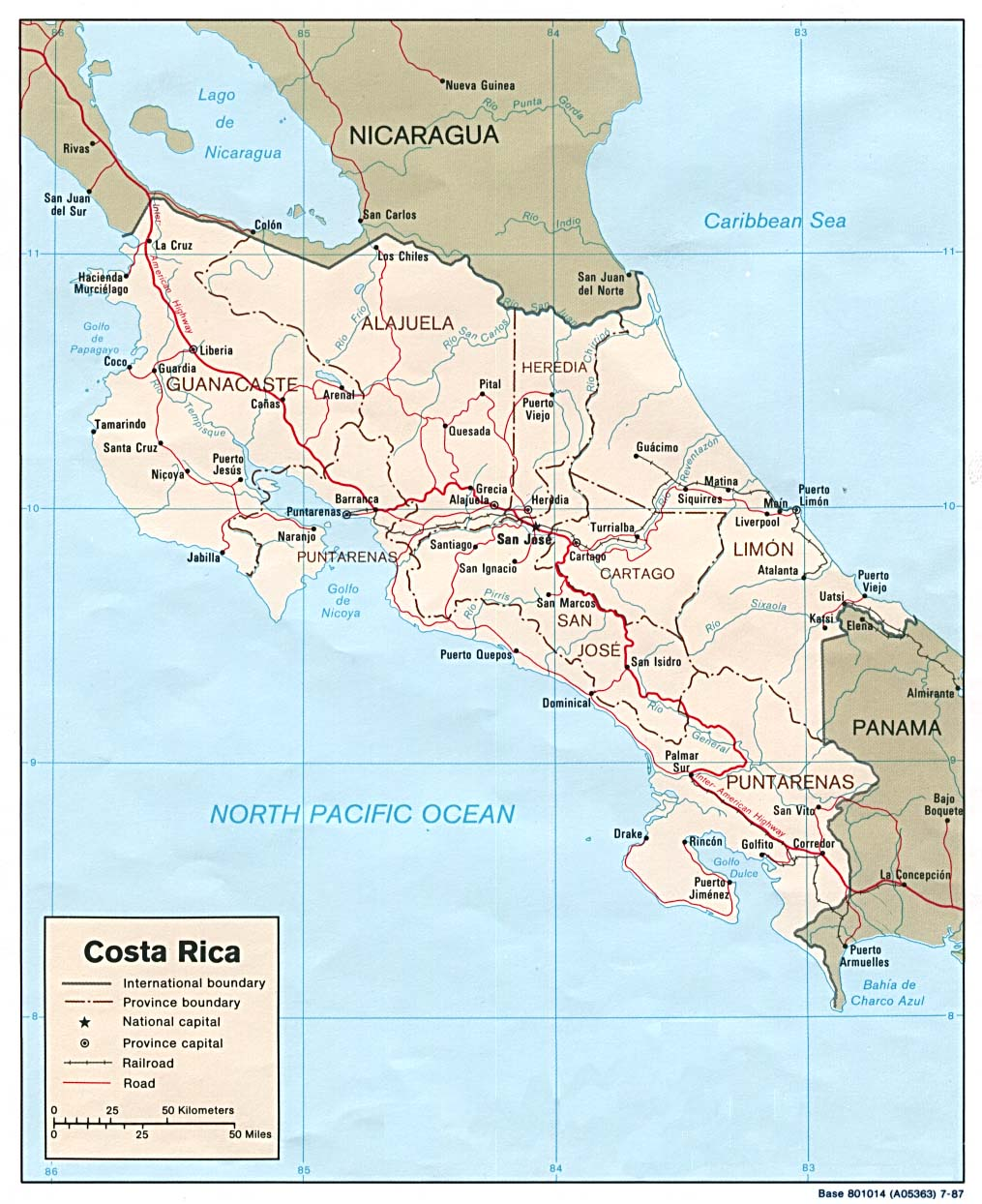
Map of Costa Rica

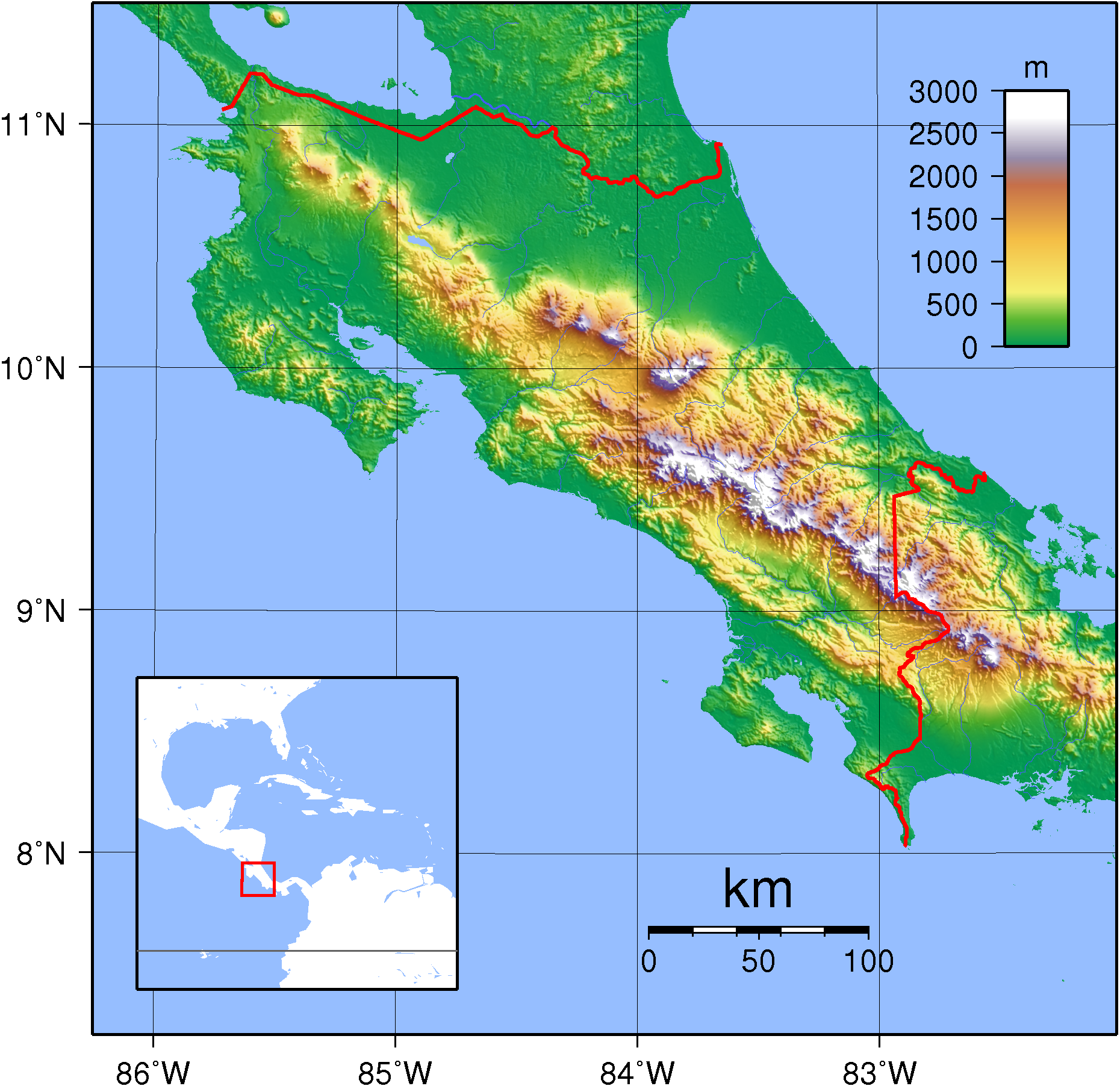
Topography of Costa Rica

== See also ==
- List of earthquakes in Costa Rica
- List of Faults in Costa Rica
- Costa Rica is party to the following treaties: Convention on Biological Diversity, Convention on Environmental Modification, United Nations Framework Convention on Climate Change, the Montreal Protocol, Ramsar Convention, International Convention for the Regulation of Whaling, Desertification Convention, Endangered Species Convention, Basel Convention, Convention on the Law of the Sea, Convention on Marine Dumping, and the Comprehensive Nuclear-Test-Ban Treaty. It has signed but not ratified the Convention on Marine Life Conservation and the Kyoto Protocol.
