= National Route 930 (Costa Rica) =

National Road Route in Costa Rica

National Tertiary Route 930
- Ruta nacional terciaria 930

Route information
- Maintained by Ministry of Public Works and Transport
- Length: 8.650 km (5.375 mi)

Location
- Country: Costa Rica
- Provinces: Guanacaste

Highway system
- National Road Network of Costa Rica
← Route 929	→ Route 931

National Tertiary Route 930, or just Route 930 (Spanish: Ruta Nacional Terciaria 930, or Ruta 930) is a National Road Route of Costa Rica, located in the Guanacaste province.

== Description ==
In Guanacaste province the route covers Cañas canton (San Miguel, Bebedero districts).
