= Líbano District =

District in Tilarán canton, Guanacaste province, Costa Rica

Líbano
- District
- Interactive map of Líbano
- Líbano district location in Costa Rica
- Coordinates: 10.4102523°N 84.9737315°W
- Country: Costa Rica
- Province: Guanacaste
- Canton: Tilarán

Area
  - Total: 72.07 km^{2} (27.83 sq mi)
- Elevation: 280 m (920 ft)

Population (2011)
  - Total: 865
  - Density: 12.0/km^{2} (31.1/sq mi)
- Time zone: UTC−06:00
- Postal code: 50805

Líbano is a district of the Tilarán canton, in the Guanacaste province of Costa Rica.

== Geography ==
Líbano has an area of 72.07 km^{2} (27.83 sq mi) and an elevation of 280 metres.

== Locations ==
- Poblados: Alto Cartago, Maravilla, San José, Solania

== Demographics ==
Historical population
Census	Pop.	±% p.a.
1927	1,188	—
1950	1,601	+1.31%
1963	812	−5.09%
1973	875	+0.75%
1984	993	+1.16%
2011	865	−0.51%
2022	940	+0.76%
Source: Instituto Nacional de Estadística y Censos; Centro Centroamericano de Población

For the 2011 census, Líbano had a population of 865 inhabitants.

== Transportation ==
=== Road transportation ===
The district is covered by the following road routes:

- National Route 925
