= National Route 926 (Costa Rica) =

National Road Route in Costa Rica

National Tertiary Route 926
- Ruta nacional terciaria 926

Route information
- Maintained by Ministry of Public Works and Transport
- Length: 41.800 km (25.973 mi)

Location
- Country: Costa Rica
- Provinces: Guanacaste

Highway system
- National Road Network of Costa Rica
← Route 925	→ Route 927

National Tertiary Route 926, or just Route 926 (Spanish: Ruta Nacional Terciaria 926, or Ruta 926) is a National Road Route of Costa Rica, located in the Guanacaste province.

== Description ==
In Guanacaste province the route covers Tilarán canton (Tilarán, Tronadora districts).
