= Tierras Morenas =

District in Tilarán canton, Guanacaste province, Costa Rica

- District
- Tierras Morenas district
- Tierras Morenas district location in Costa Rica
- Coordinates: 10.5903468°N 84.9878954°W
- Country: Costa Rica
- Province: Guanacaste
- Canton: Tilarán

Area
  - Total: 83.46 km^{2} (32.22 sq mi)
- Elevation: 685 m (2,247 ft)

Population (2011)
  - Total: 1,358
  - Density: 16.27/km^{2} (42.14/sq mi)
- Time zone: UTC−06:00
- Postal code: 50806

Tierras Morenas is a district of the Tilarán canton, in the Guanacaste province of Costa Rica.

== Geography ==
Tierras Morenas has an area of 83.46 km^{2} (32.22 sq mi) and an elevation of 685 metres.

== Locations ==
- Poblados: Aguacate, Aguas Gatas (part), Bajo Paires, Guadalajara, Montes de Oro (part), Paraíso (part), Río Piedras, Sabalito

== Demographics ==
Historical population
Census	Pop.	±% p.a.
1927	777	—
1950	1,112	+1.57%
1963	1,611	+2.89%
1973	1,337	−1.85%
1984	1,223	−0.81%
2000	1,187	−0.19%
2011	1,358	+1.23%
2022	1,295	−0.43%
Source: Instituto Nacional de Estadística y Censos; Centro Centroamericano de Población

For the 2011 census, Tierras Morenas had a population of 1,358 inhabitants.

== Transportation ==
=== Road transportation ===
The district is covered by the following road routes:

- National Route 142
- National Route 927
