= Cañas (canton) =

Canton in Guanacaste province, Costa Rica

- Canton
- Flag
- Interactive map of Cañas
- Cañas canton location in Costa Rica
- Coordinates: 10.4457066°N 85.0991768°W
- Country: Costa Rica
- Province: Guanacaste
- Creation: 12 July 1878
- Head city: Cañas
- Districts: Districts: Cañas; Palmira; San Miguel; Bebedero; Porozal

Government
  - Type: Municipality
  - Body: Municipalidad de Cañas

Area
  - Total: 682.2 km^{2} (263.4 sq mi)
- Elevation: 86 m (282 ft)

Population (2011)
  - Total: 26,201
  - Density: 38.41/km^{2} (99.47/sq mi)
- Time zone: UTC−06:00
- Canton code: 506
- Website: www.municanas.go.cr

Cañas is a canton in the Guanacaste province of Costa Rica. The head city is in Cañas district.

== History ==
Cañas was created on 12 July 1878 by decree 22.

== Geography ==
Cañas has an area of 682.2 km^{2} (263.4 sq mi) and a mean elevation of 86 metres. The elongated canton touches the Tempisque River in the southwest. It keeps the Bebedero River and Tenorio River on its western boundary as it widens to encompass agricultural lowlands before climbing into the Cordillera de Guanacaste up to the Tenorio Volcano.

=== Climate ===
Climate data for Canas (1984–2003)
Month	Jan	Feb	Mar	Apr	May	Jun	Jul	Aug	Sep	Oct	Nov	Dec	Year
Mean daily maximum °C (°F)	31.8 (89.2)	32.7 (90.9)	33.8 (92.8)	34.4 (93.9)	33.5 (92.3)	32.3 (90.1)	31.9 (89.4)	32.1 (89.8)	31.8 (89.2)	31.5 (88.7)	31.4 (88.5)	31.5 (88.7)	32.4 (90.3)
Mean daily minimum °C (°F)	22.5 (72.5)	22.9 (73.2)	23.2 (73.8)	24.0 (75.2)	23.7 (74.7)	23.2 (73.8)	22.9 (73.2)	23.0 (73.4)	22.5 (72.5)	22.5 (72.5)	22.4 (72.3)	22.7 (72.9)	23.0 (73.3)
Average precipitation mm (inches)	4.2 (0.17)	4.3 (0.17)	7.4 (0.29)	44.5 (1.75)	174.9 (6.89)	235.1 (9.26)	160.6 (6.32)	204.9 (8.07)	308.0 (12.13)	285.5 (11.24)	109.3 (4.30)	21.0 (0.83)	1,559.7 (61.42)
Source: World Meteorological Organization

== Districts ==
The canton of Cañas is subdivided into the following districts:

1. Cañas
2. Palmira
3. San Miguel
4. Bebedero
5. Porozal

== Demographics ==
Historical population
Census	Pop.	±% p.a.
1883	595	—
1892	2,165	+15.43%
1927	3,500	+1.38%
1950	5,929	+2.32%
1963	9,117	+3.37%
1973	12,779	+3.43%
1984	17,284	+2.78%
2000	24,076	+2.09%
2011	26,201	+0.77%
2022	31,738	+1.76%
Source: Instituto Nacional de Estadística y Censos; Centro Centroamericano de Población

For the 2011 census, Cañas had a population of 26,201 inhabitants.

== Transportation ==
=== Road transportation ===
The canton is covered by the following road routes:

- National Route 1
- National Route 6
- National Route 18
- National Route 142
- National Route 923
- National Route 925
- National Route 927
- National Route 930
