= National Route 923 (Costa Rica) =

National Road Route in Costa Rica

National Tertiary Route 923
- Ruta nacional terciaria 923

Route information
- Maintained by Ministry of Public Works and Transport
- Length: 14.700 km (9.134 mi)

Location
- Country: Costa Rica
- Provinces: Guanacaste

Highway system
- National Road Network of Costa Rica
← Route 922	→ Route 925

National Tertiary Route 923, or just Route 923 (Spanish: Ruta Nacional Terciaria 923, or Ruta 923) is a National Road Route of Costa Rica located in the Guanacaste province.

== Description ==
In Guanacaste province the route covers Bagaces canton (Bagaces district), Cañas canton (Cañas, Bebedero districts).
