= Tejona =

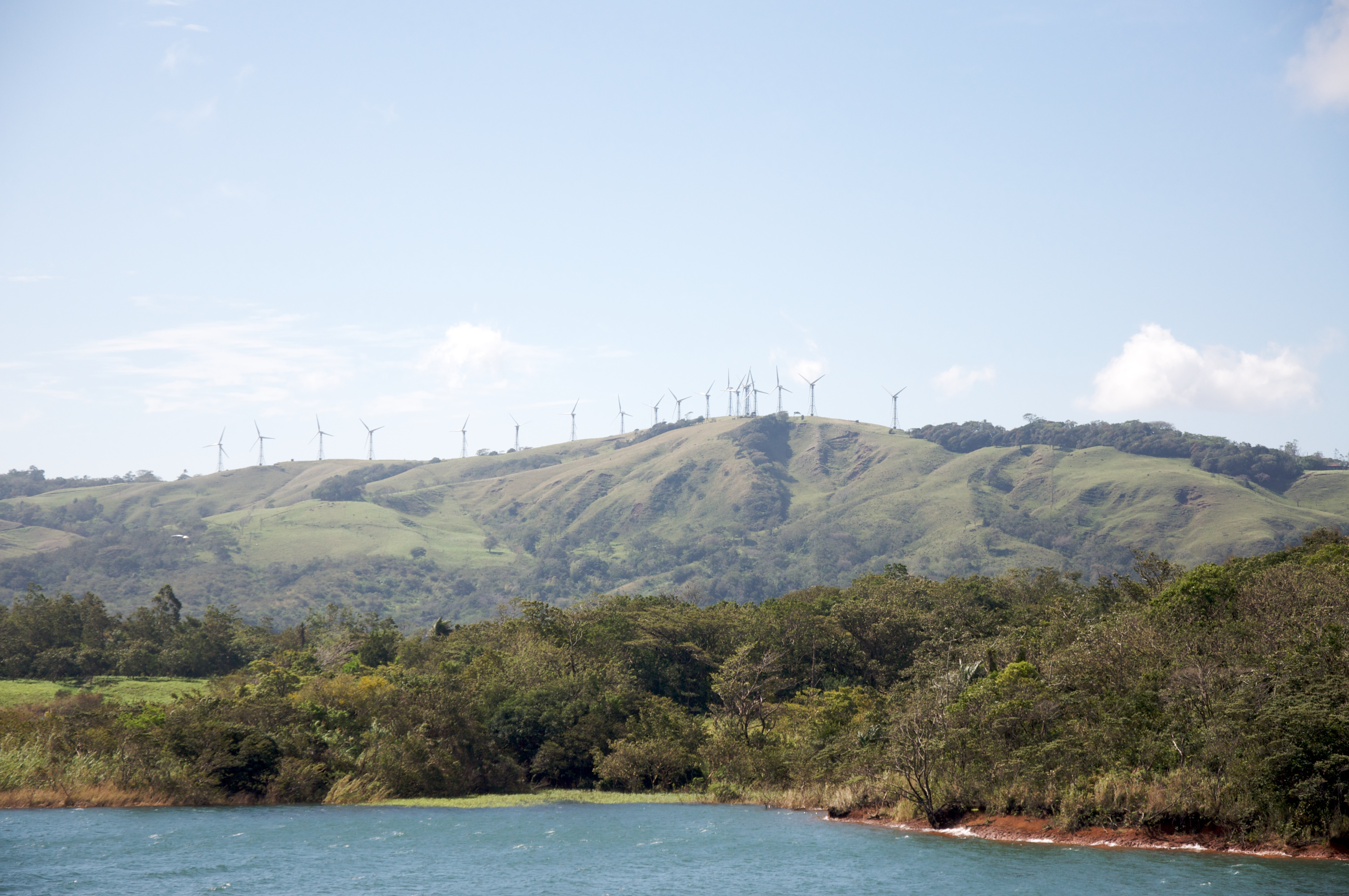
- Tejona wind farm

- Location in Costa Rica
- Coordinates: 10°30′N 84°58′W
- Country: Costa Rica
- Province: Guanacaste Province
- Canton: Tilaran
- Time zone: UTC-6 (UTC -6)

Tejona is a village in the Guanacaste Province, Costa Rica. It is located on Lake Arenal and has a hydroelectric power station. Hotel Tilawa and skateboarding park as well as the Tilawa Viento Surf Center and Arenal Botanical Gardens are located nearby. Some 100 wind turbines, standing at 120 ft (35m) are located southwest of the village on the hills and supply electricity to the national grid. The wind farm is the largest in Central America with an annual production of up to 70MW. Electricity is sold to the Instituto Costarricense de Electricidad.

It is connected by the 142 road up the hills to the canton seat of Tilarán.

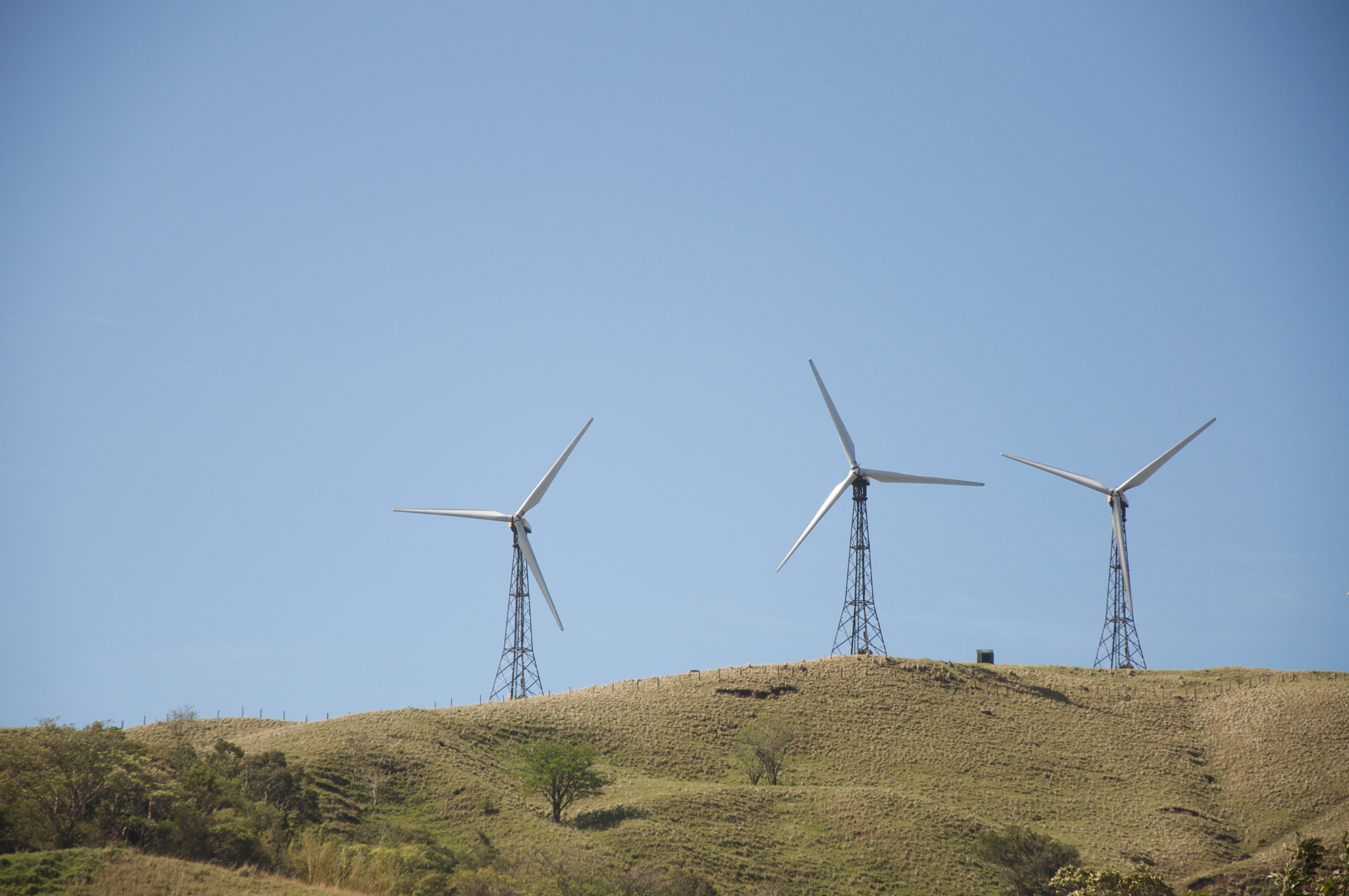
Tejona wind farm
