= National Route 925 (Costa Rica) =

National Road Route in Costa Rica

National Tertiary Route 925
- Ruta nacional terciaria 925

Route information
- Maintained by Ministry of Public Works and Transport
- Length: 32.885 km (20.434 mi)

Location
- Country: Costa Rica
- Provinces: Guanacaste

Highway system
- National Road Network of Costa Rica
← Route 923	→ Route 926

National Tertiary Route 925, or just Route 925 (Spanish: Ruta Nacional Terciaria 925, or Ruta 925) is a National Road Route of Costa Rica, located in the Guanacaste province.

== Description ==
In Guanacaste province the route covers Cañas canton (Cañas, San Miguel districts), Tilarán canton (Tilarán, Líbano districts).
