= National Route 936 (Costa Rica) =

National Road Route in Costa Rica

National Tertiary Route 936
- Ruta nacional terciaria 936

Route information
- Maintained by Ministry of Public Works and Transport
- Length: 30.825 km (19.154 mi)

Location
- Country: Costa Rica
- Provinces: Alajuela, Guanacaste

Highway system
- National Road Network of Costa Rica
← Route 935	→ Route 937

National Tertiary Route 936, also known as Route 936 (Spanish: Ruta Nacional Terciaria 936, or Ruta 936) is a National Road Route of Costa Rica, located in the Alajuela andGuanacaste provinces.

== Description ==
In Alajuela province the route covers San Ramón canton (Peñas Blancas district) andSan Carlos canton (La Fortuna district).

In Guanacaste province the route covers Tilarán canton (Tronadora district).
