= National Route 165 (Costa Rica) =

National Road Route in Costa Rica

National Secondary Route 165
- Ruta nacional secundaria 165

Route information
- Maintained by Ministry of Public Works and Transport
- Length: 13.885 km (8.628 mi)

Location
- Country: Costa Rica
- Provinces: Guanacaste

Highway system
- National Road Network of Costa Rica
← Route 164	→ Route 167

National Secondary Route 165, or just Route 165 (Spanish: Ruta Nacional Secundaria 165, or Ruta 165) is a National Road Route of Costa Rica located in the Guanacaste province.

== Description ==
In Guanacaste province., the route covers Bagaces canton (Bagaces, Fortuna, and Mogote districts).
