= Bagaces (canton) =

Canton in Guanacaste province, Costa Rica

- Canton
- Flag Seal
- Interactive map of Bagaces
- Bagaces canton location in Costa Rica
- Coordinates: 10.515659°N 85.2477995°W
- Country: Costa Rica
- Province: Guanacaste
- Creation: 7 December 1848
- Head city: Bagaces
- Districts: Districts: Bagaces; Fortuna; Mogote; Río Naranjo

Government
  - Type: Municipality
  - Body: Municipalidad de Bagaces

Area
  - Total: 889.07 km^{2} (343.27 sq mi)
- Elevation: 396 m (1,299 ft)

Population (2011)
  - Total: 19,536
  - Density: 21.974/km^{2} (56.911/sq mi)
- Time zone: UTC−06:00
- Canton code: 504
- Website: www.bagaces.go.cr

Bagaces is a canton in the Guanacaste province of Costa Rica. The head city is in Bagaces district.

== History ==
In the Pre-Columbian era, Bagaces was home to the Nicarao people who settled in Guanacaste after migrating from Central and southern Mexico. Evidence of Mesoamerican style markets and Jade showed that Bagaces had flourished during Pre-Columbian times. Bagaces was created on 7 December 1848 by decree 167. Bagaces is also one of the oldest settlements in early Spanish conquest in the 1540s. It became an important town after 1601 when the "Mule Trail" was established communicating Cartago, the capital of the province, with Guatemala, the capital of the Captaincy General. Bagaces was a necessary night stop and later acquired fame because of its dry bisquist (Biscocho) and cheese (Queso Bagaces), an important supply for the long ride.

== Geography ==
Bagaces has an area of 1,273.49 km^{2} (491.70 sq mi) and a mean elevation of 396 metres.

The Salto River on the west and Tenorio River on the east delineate this canton, with the Tempisque River as the southern border and the northern border high in the Cordillera de Guanacaste. Miravalles Volcano sits near that border's midway point.

== Districts ==
The canton of Bagaces is subdivided into the following districts:

1. Bagaces
2. Fortuna
3. Mogote
4. Río Naranjo

== Demographics ==
Historical population
Census	Pop.	±% p.a.
1864	1,638	—
1883	991	−2.61%
1892	1,476	+4.53%
1927	1,890	+0.71%
1950	4,079	+3.40%
1963	9,836	+7.01%
1973	9,828	−0.01%
1984	10,103	+0.25%
2000	15,972	+2.90%
2011	19,536	+1.85%
2022	23,709	+1.78%
Source: Instituto Nacional de Estadística y Censos; Centro Centroamericano de Población

For the 2011 census, Bagaces had a population of 19,536 inhabitants.

== Transportation ==
=== Road transportation ===
The canton is covered by the following road routes:

- National Route 1
- National Route 6
- National Route 164
- National Route 165
- National Route 922
- National Route 923
