= National Route 734 (Costa Rica) =

National Road Route in Costa Rica

National Tertiary Route 734
- Ruta nacional terciaria 734

Route information
- Maintained by Ministry of Public Works and Transport
- Length: 29.760 km (18.492 mi)

Location
- Country: Costa Rica
- Provinces: Alajuela, Guanacaste

Highway system
- National Road Network of Costa Rica
← Route 733	→ Route 735

National Tertiary Route 734, or just Route 734 (Spanish: Ruta Nacional Terciaria 734, or Ruta 734) is a National Road Route of Costa Rica, located in the Alajuela, Guanacaste provinces.

== Description ==
In Alajuela province the route covers San Carlos canton (Venado district).

In Guanacaste province the route covers Tilarán canton (Arenal district).
