= National Route 922 (Costa Rica) =

National Road Route in Costa Rica

National Tertiary Route 922
- Ruta nacional terciaria 922

Route information
- Maintained by Ministry of Public Works and Transport
- Length: 20.080 km (12.477 mi)

Location
- Country: Costa Rica
- Provinces: Guanacaste

Highway system
- National Road Network of Costa Rica
← Route 921	→ Route 923

National Tertiary Route 922, or just Route 922 (Spanish: Ruta Nacional Terciaria 922, or Ruta 922) is a National Road Route of Costa Rica, located in the Guanacaste province.

== Description ==
In Guanacaste province the route covers Bagaces canton (Bagaces district).
