= National Route 927 (Costa Rica) =

National Road Route in Costa Rica

National Tertiary Route 927
- Ruta nacional terciaria 927

Route information
- Maintained by Ministry of Public Works and Transport
- Length: 22.210 km (13.801 mi)

Location
- Country: Costa Rica
- Provinces: Guanacaste

Highway system
- National Road Network of Costa Rica
← Route 926	→ Route 928

National Tertiary Route 927, or just Route 927 (Spanish: Ruta Nacional Terciaria 927, or Ruta 927) is a National Road Route of Costa Rica, located in the Guanacaste province.

== Description ==
In Guanacaste province the route covers Cañas canton (Palmira district), Tilarán canton (Santa Rosa, Tierras Morenas districts).
