= Arenal Botanical Gardens =

Arenal Botanical Gardens are on the eastern shore of Lake Arenal in northwest Costa Rica, 2 kilometers north of the village of Unión, Guanacaste. Opened in 1991, the facility hosts hundreds of tropical plants and flowers as well as a hummingbird sanctuary and butterfly garden.

In recent years, the gardens have fallen into disrepair; they are now in poor condition.
