= Arenal District, Tilarán =

District in Guanacaste province, Costa Rica

Arenal
- District
- Interactive map of Arenal
- Arenal district location in Costa Rica
- Coordinates: 10.5243226°N 84.8630661°W
- Country: Costa Rica
- Province: Guanacaste
- Canton: Tilarán
- Creation: 16 April 1979

Area
  - Total: 73.72 km^{2} (28.46 sq mi)
- Elevation: 620 m (2,030 ft)

Population (2011)
  - Total: 2,300
  - Density: 31/km^{2} (81/sq mi)
- Time zone: UTC−06:00
- Postal code: 50807

Arenal is a district of the Tilarán canton, in the Guanacaste province of Costa Rica. The relocated town of Nuevo Arenal is located in this district.

== History ==
Arenal was created on 16 April 1979 by Decreto Ejecutivo 10002-G.

== Geography ==
Arenal has an area of 73.72 km^{2} (28.46 sq mi) and an elevation of 620 metres.

== Locations ==
- Poblados: Mata de Caña, Sangregado, San Antonio, Unión

== Demographics ==
Historical population
| Census | Pop. | ±% p.a. |
|---|---|---|
| 1984 | 1,751 | — |
| 2000 | 2,175 | +1.36% |
| 2011 | 2,300 | +0.51% |
| 2022 | 2,346 | +0.18% |
Source: Instituto Nacional de Estadística y Censos; Centro Centroamericano de Población

For the 2011 census, Arenal had a population of 2,300 inhabitants.

== Transportation ==
=== Road transportation ===
The district is covered by the following road routes:

- National Route 142
- National Route 143
- National Route 734
