= National Route 142 (Costa Rica) =

National Road Route in Costa Rica

National Secondary Route 142
- Ruta nacional secundaria 142

Route information
- Maintained by Ministry of Public Works and Transport
- Length: 105.680 km (65.667 mi)

Location
- Country: Costa Rica
- Provinces: Alajuela, Guanacaste

Highway system
- National Road Network of Costa Rica
← Route 141	→ Route 143

National Secondary Route 142, or just Route 142 (Spanish: Ruta Nacional Secundaria 142, or Ruta 142) is a National Road Route of Costa Rica, located in the Alajuela, Guanacaste provinces.

== Description ==
In Alajuela province the route covers San Carlos canton (La Fortuna district).

In Guanacaste province the route covers Cañas canton (Cañas district) and Tilarán canton (Tilarán, Santa Rosa, Tierras Morenas, and Arenal districts).
