= List of faults in Costa Rica =

The geology of Costa Rica is shaped by a complex tectonic setting at the junction of the Caribbean, Cocos, Nazca, and Panama plates. Active deformation associated with subduction and crustal faulting has produces faults throughout the country, many of which are capable of generating damaging earthquakes. Fault activity also contributes to the country's volcanism and its ongoing mountain building process.

The list comprises named faults and fault systems identified through geological mapping and scientific literature. the faults vary in type, length and degree of activity while including strike slip, normal and reverse faults. While some have been associated with historical earthquakes, many are recognized primarily through geological and geophysical investigation.

== Faults ==
The following is a partial list of faults in Costa Rica:

- Agua Caliente Fault, in the Central Valley.
- Alajuela Fault, in the Central Valley.
- Ángel-Varablanca Fault, in the Central Valley.
- Atirro Fault, in Turrialba.
- Buenavista Fault, in Pérez Zeledón.
- Canoas Fault, in the Southern Zone.
- Chiripa Fault, in the Northern Zone.
- Escazú Fault, in the Central Valley.
- Golfito Fault, in Golfito.
- Guápiles Fault, in Caribbean Zone.
- Jateo Fault, in the Central Valley.
- Navarro Fault, in Turrialba.
- San Miguel Fault, in the Central Valley.
- Zarceró Fault, in the Northern Zone.
