= Santa Rosa District, Tilarán =

District in Tilarán canton, Guanacaste province, Costa Rica

Santa Rosa
- District
- Santa Rosa district
- Santa Rosa district location in Costa Rica
- Coordinates: 10.5067812°N 84.9967175°W
- Country: Costa Rica
- Province: Guanacaste
- Canton: Tilarán

Area
  - Total: 71.8 km^{2} (27.7 sq mi)
- Elevation: 432 m (1,417 ft)

Population (2011)
  - Total: 1,945
  - Density: 27.1/km^{2} (70.2/sq mi)
- Time zone: UTC−06:00
- Postal code: 50804

Santa Rosa is a district of the Tilarán canton, in the Guanacaste province of Costa Rica.

== Geography ==
Santa Rosa has an area of 71.8 km^{2} (27.7 sq mi) and an elevation of 432 metres.

== Locations ==
- Poblados: Aguilares, Campos Azules, Montes de Oro (part), Naranjos Agrios, Palma, Quebrada Azul, Ranchitos, Santa Rosa

== Demographics ==
Historical population
Census	Pop.	±% p.a.
1927	1,066	—
1950	1,751	+2.18%
1963	1,750	−0.00%
1973	1,407	−2.16%
1984	1,309	−0.65%
2000	1,690	+1.61%
2011	1,945	+1.29%
2022	2,369	+1.81%
Source: Instituto Nacional de Estadística y Censos; Centro Centroamericano de Población

For the 2011 census, Santa Rosa had a population of 1,945 inhabitants.

== Transportation ==
=== Road transportation ===
The district is covered by the following road routes:

- National Route 142
- National Route 927
