= El Arenal, Santiago del Estero =

El Arenal
- Municipality and village
- Location within Argentina
- Coordinates: 26°43′S 64°24′W
- Country: Argentina
- Province: Santiago del Estero
- Department: Jiménez
- Time zone: UTC−3 (ART)

El Arenal is a municipality and village in Santiago del Estero in Argentina.
