= Tilarán (canton) =

Canton in Guanacaste province, Costa Rica

- Canton
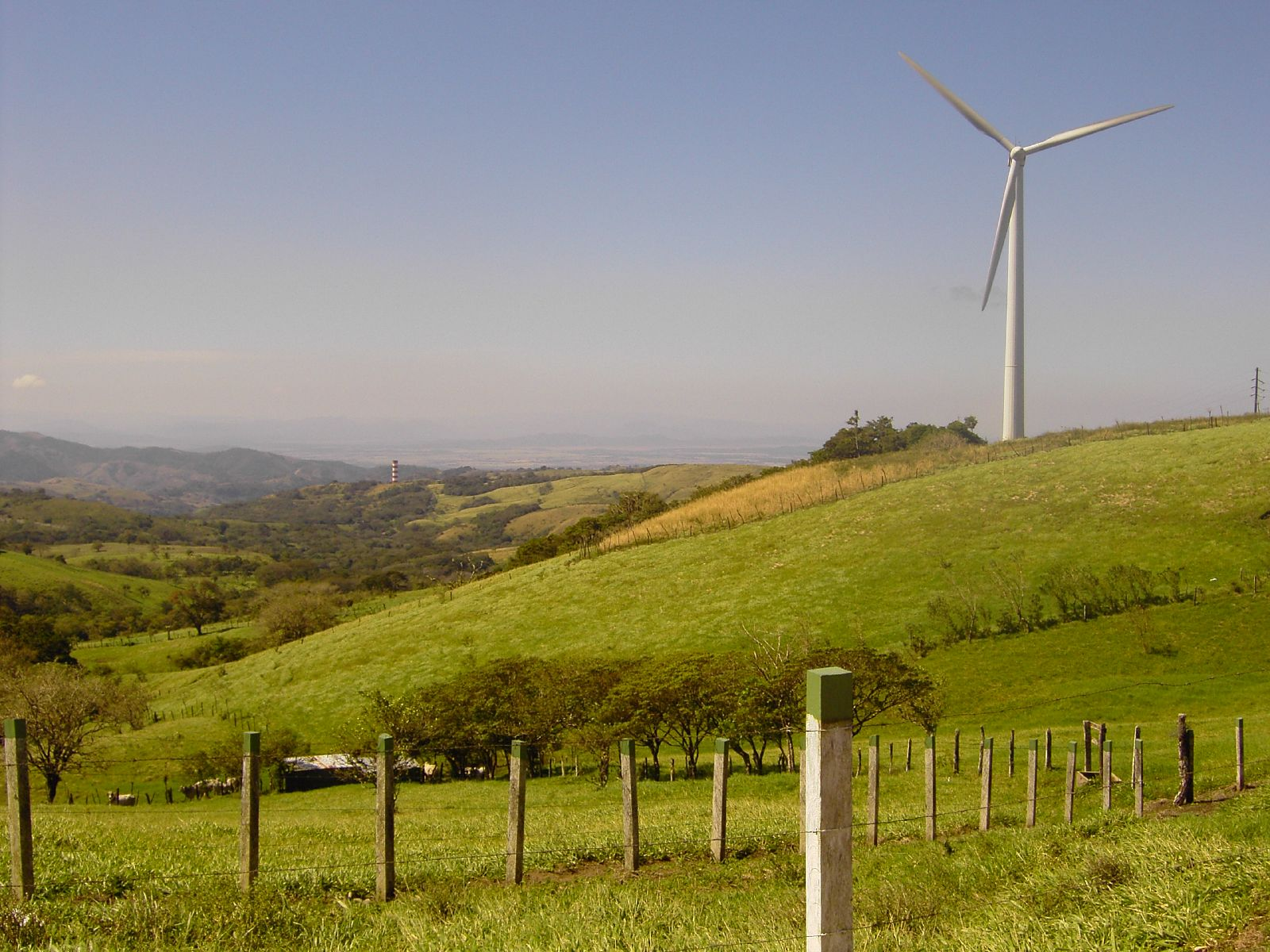
- Tilaran wind power industry

- Flag
- Tilarán canton
- Tilarán canton location in Costa Rica
- Coordinates: 10.4896428°N 84.9065083°W
- Country: Costa Rica
- Province: Guanacaste
- Creation: 21 August 1923
- Head city: Tilarán
- Districts: Districts: Tilarán; Quebrada Grande; Tronadora; Santa Rosa; Líbano; Tierras Morenas; Arenal; Cabeceras

Government
  - Type: Municipality
  - Body: Municipalidad de Tilarán

Area
  - Total: 638.39 km^{2} (246.48 sq mi)
- Elevation: 579 m (1,900 ft)

Population (2011)
  - Total: 19,640
  - Density: 30.76/km^{2} (79.68/sq mi)
- Time zone: UTC−06:00
- Canton code: 508
- Website: www.tilaran.go.cr

Tilarán is a canton in the Guanacaste province of Costa Rica. The head city is in Tilarán district.

== History ==
Tilarán was created on August 21, 1923 by decree 170.

== Geography ==
Tilarán has an area of 638.39 km^{2} (246.48 sq mi) and a mean elevation of 579 metres.

The canton surrounds Lake Arenal except for the lake's southeast end, which belongs to the province of Alajuela. The northern border is in the Cordillera de Guanacaste, touching the Corobicí River at its northernmost limits. The southern part of the canton is in the Cordillera de Tilarán (mountain range).

== Districts ==
The canton of Tilarán is subdivided into the following districts:

1. Tilarán
2. Quebrada Grande
3. Tronadora
4. Santa Rosa
5. Líbano
6. Tierras Morenas
7. Arenal
8. Cabeceras

== Demographics ==
Historical population
| Census | Pop. | ±% p.a. |
|---|---|---|
| 1927 | 6,131 | — |
| 1950 | 9,057 | +1.71% |
| 1963 | 12,097 | +2.25% |
| 1973 | 12,563 | +0.38% |
| 1984 | 14,586 | +1.37% |
| 2000 | 17,871 | +1.28% |
| 2011 | 19,640 | +0.86% |
| 2022 | 21,232 | +0.71% |
Source: Instituto Nacional de Estadística y Censos; Centro Centroamericano de Población

For the 2011 census, Tilarán had a population of 19,640 inhabitants.

== Transportation ==
=== Road transportation ===
The canton is covered by the following road routes:

- National Route 142
- National Route 143
- National Route 145
- National Route 606
- National Route 619
- National Route 734
- National Route 925
- National Route 926
- National Route 927
- National Route 936

== Notable people ==
- Leonidas Flores - Retired footballer
- Carlos Palacios Herrera - Professional cyclist
- Luis Esteban Herrera - Pianist
- Doris Murillo Boniche - Local artist. Retired art professor.
- Danadith Tayals - Poet
- Mark List - Driver on the Monster Jam circuit
