= Arenal District, Paita =

Coordinates: 4°53′03″S 81°01′37″W

Arenal
- District
- Interactive map of Arenal
- Country: Peru
- Region: Piura
- Province: Paita
- Founded: November 3, 1874
- Capital: Arenal

Government
  - Mayor: Alberto Gonzales

Area
  - Total: 8.19 km^{2} (3.16 sq mi)
- Elevation: 50 m (160 ft)

Population (2005 census)
  - Total: 1,133
  - Density: 138/km^{2} (358/sq mi)
- Time zone: UTC-5 (PET)
- UBIGEO: 200503

Arenal District is one of seven districts of the province Paita in Peru.
