= Bagaces =

District in Guanacaste province, Costa Rica

- District
- Interactive map of Bagaces
- Bagaces district location in Costa Rica
- Coordinates: 10.4481144°N 85.2931365°W
- Country: Costa Rica
- Province: Guanacaste
- Canton: Bagaces

Area
  - Total: 883.98 km^{2} (341.31 sq mi)
- Elevation: 80 m (260 ft)

Population (2011)
  - Total: 12,367
  - Density: 13.990/km^{2} (36.234/sq mi)
- Time zone: UTC−06:00
- Postal code: 50401

Bagaces is a district of the Bagaces canton, in the Guanacaste province of Costa Rica.

== Geography ==
Bagaces has an area of 883.98 km^{2} (341.31 sq mi) and an elevation of 80 metres.

== Communities ==
The district includes the towns of Bagaces, Pijije, Montenegro, Montano, and Salitral.

== Demographics ==
Historical population
Census	Pop.	±% p.a.
1883	517	—
1892	419	−2.31%
1927	1,890	+4.40%
1950	4,079	+3.40%
1963	9,836	+7.01%
1973	4,867	−6.79%
1984	5,909	+1.78%
2000	9,261	+2.85%
2011	12,367	+2.66%
2022	15,858	+2.29%
Source: Instituto Nacional de Estadística y Censos; Centro Centroamericano de Población

For the 2011 census, Bagaces had a population of 12,367 inhabitants.

== Transportation ==
=== Road transportation ===
The Inter-American Highway runs east–west through the middle of the district.

The district is covered by the following road routes:

- National Route 1
- National Route 164
- National Route 165
- National Route 922
- National Route 923
