= Arenal del Sur =

Arenal
- Municipality and town
- Flag

- Location of the municipality and town of Arenal del Sur in the Bolívar Department of Colombia

- Location in Colombia
- Coordinates: 8°28′N 73°57′W
- Country: Colombia
- Department: Bolívar Department

Area
  - Municipality and town: 534 km^{2} (206 sq mi)
- Elevation: 65 m (213 ft)

Population (2015)
  - Municipality and town: 18,876
  - Urban: 5,173
- Climate: Aw

Arenal is a town and municipality located in the Bolívar Department, northern Colombia.
