= Cañas District =

District in Cañas canton, Guanacaste province, Costa Rica

Cañas
- District
- Interactive map of Cañas
- Cañas district location in Costa Rica
- Coordinates: 10.4447767°N 85.1039836°W
- Country: Costa Rica
- Province: Guanacaste
- Canton: Cañas

Area
  - Total: 193.83 km^{2} (74.84 sq mi)
- Elevation: 86 m (282 ft)

Population (2011)
  - Total: 20,816
  - Density: 107.39/km^{2} (278.15/sq mi)
- Time zone: UTC−06:00
- Postal code: 50601

Cañas is a district of the Cañas canton, in the Guanacaste province of Costa Rica.

== Geography ==
Cañas has an area of 193.83 km^{2} and an elevation of 86 metres.

== Villages ==
Administrative center of the district is the town of Cañas.

Other villages in the district are Albania, Ángeles, Cantarrana, Castillo, Cueva, Miravalles, San Cristóbal, San Martín, San Pedro, Unión. And their villages are Cedros, Cepo Concepción, Corobicí, Correntadas, Hotel, Jabilla Abajo, Jabilla Arriba, Libertad, Montes de Oro, Paso Lajas, Pueblo Nuevo, Sandillal, San Isidro (partly), Santa Lucía (partly) and Vergel.

== Climate ==
Climate data for Cañas, Costa Rica
| Month | Jan | Feb | Mar | Apr | May | Jun | Jul | Aug | Sep | Oct | Nov | Dec | Year |
|---|---|---|---|---|---|---|---|---|---|---|---|---|---|
| Mean daily maximum °C (°F) | 31.8 (89.2) | 32.7 (90.9) | 33.8 (92.8) | 34.4 (93.9) | 33.5 (92.3) | 32.3 (90.1) | 31.9 (89.4) | 32.1 (89.8) | 31.8 (89.2) | 31.5 (88.7) | 31.4 (88.5) | 31.5 (88.7) | 32.4 (90.3) |
| Daily mean °C (°F) | 27.1 (80.8) | 27.8 (82.0) | 28.5 (83.3) | 29.2 (84.6) | 28.6 (83.5) | 27.8 (82.0) | 27.4 (81.3) | 27.6 (81.7) | 27.1 (80.8) | 27.0 (80.6) | 26.9 (80.4) | 27.1 (80.8) | 27.7 (81.8) |
| Mean daily minimum °C (°F) | 22.5 (72.5) | 22.9 (73.2) | 23.2 (73.8) | 24.0 (75.2) | 23.7 (74.7) | 23.2 (73.8) | 22.9 (73.2) | 23.0 (73.4) | 22.5 (72.5) | 22.5 (72.5) | 22.4 (72.3) | 22.7 (72.9) | 23.0 (73.3) |
| Average precipitation mm (inches) | 4.2 (0.17) | 4.3 (0.17) | 7.4 (0.29) | 44.5 (1.75) | 174.9 (6.89) | 235.1 (9.26) | 160.6 (6.32) | 204.9 (8.07) | 308.0 (12.13) | 285.5 (11.24) | 109.3 (4.30) | 21.0 (0.83) | 1,559.7 (61.42) |
| Average rainy days | 0.1 | 0.1 | 0.2 | 1.4 | 5.6 | 7.8 | 5.1 | 6.6 | 10.2 | 9.2 | 3.5 | 0.6 | 50.4 |
| Mean monthly sunshine hours | 248.0 | 227.7 | 256.2 | 254.0 | 268.6 | 262.0 | 268.6 | 264.5 | 250.0 | 252.1 | 240.0 | 245.9 | 3,037.6 |
Source: Weatherbase.com "Monthly All Weather Averages Ca?as, Costa Rica". weatherbase.com.

== Demographics ==
Historical population
| Census | Pop. | ±% p.a. |
|---|---|---|
| 1883 | 345 | — |
| 1892 | 401 | +1.69% |
| 1927 | 3,500 | +6.39% |
| 1950 | 5,929 | +2.32% |
| 1963 | 9,117 | +3.37% |
| 1973 | 12,779 | +3.43% |
| 1984 | 17,284 | +2.78% |
| 2000 | 18,798 | +0.53% |
| 2011 | 20,816 | +0.93% |
| 2022 | 23,624 | +1.16% |
Source: Instituto Nacional de Estadística y Censos; Centro Centroamericano de Población

For the 2011 census, Cañas had a population of 20,816 inhabitants.

== Transportation ==
=== Road transportation ===
The district is covered by the following road routes:

- National Route 1
- National Route 6
- National Route 142
- National Route 923
- National Route 925
