= Lake Arenal =

Artificial lake in Costa Rica

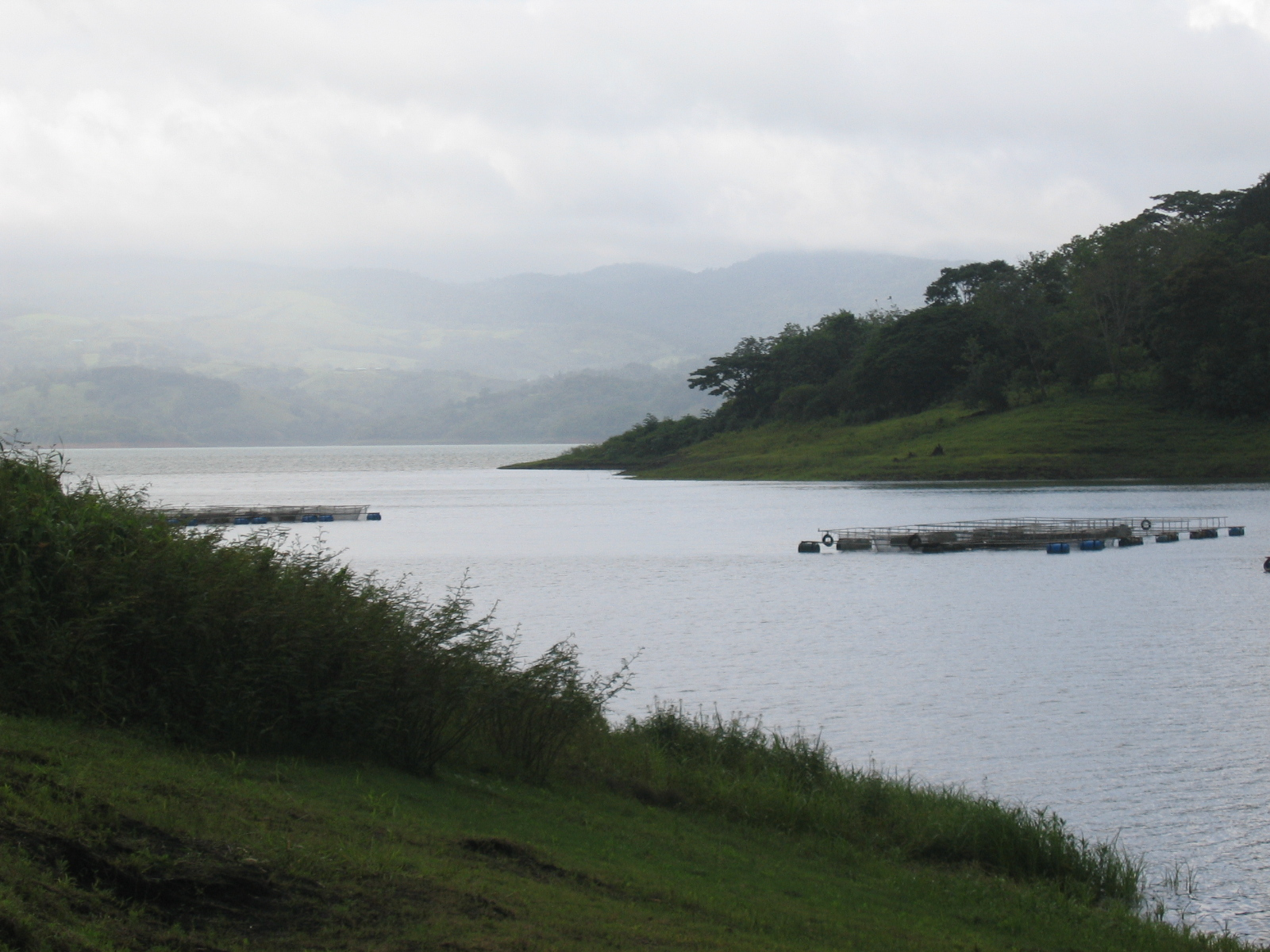
- A view from the southwest side looking across at the north depth 30–60 m (98–197 ft)

- Location in Costa Rica
- Location: Alajuela and Guanacaste Provinces, Costa Rica
- Coordinates: 10.505167°N 84.872168°W
- Max. length: 30 kilometres (19 mi)
- Max. width: 5 kilometres (3.1 mi)
- Surface area: 85 square kilometres (33 sq mi)
- Max. depth: 100 metres (330 ft)
- Islands: Isla Arenal
- Settlements: Nuevo Arenal, Tronadora

Ramsar Wetland
- Official name: Embalse Arenal
- Designated: 7 March 2000
- Reference no.: 1022

Lake Arenal (Spanish: Lago Arenal) is a lake in the northern highlands of Costa Rica. It is the largest lake in Costa Rica at 85 square kilometres (33 mi^{2}). Its depth varies between 30 and 60 meters (98 and 197 feet) seasonally.

== History ==
Originally a natural lake, Lake Arenal was tripled in size with the 1979 construction of the Presa Sangregado Dam at the southeastern end. All land below the 550-meter level was expropriated by the Costa Rican government. The old towns of Arenal and Tronadora now lie at the bottom of the lake; their residents were resettled in the new town of Arenal to the northeast. The dam also displaced a large cattle operation, Hacienda La Rosita, which was owned and operated by P. Eckrich & Sons, a subsidiary of the U.S. corporation Beatrice Foods. Hacienda La Rosita occupied most of the land that is now Lake Arenal as well as additional land surrounding the lake.

== Hydroelectricity ==
The Presa Sangregado Dam hydroelectric project at the eastern end of the lake is strategically important to Costa Rica. It initially generated 70% of the country's electricity, though now it generates closer to 17%. It was a driving force behind Costa Rica's green energy policy.

== Wildlife ==
Fish species in Lake Arenal include the machaca and the rainbow bass. Its environs are home to about 120 species of mammals; including jaguars and tapirs; about 300 species of birds, including quetzals; and many species of plants.

== Recreation ==
From November through April the strong, dependable winds attract windsurfers and kite surfers to its western end. Many consider Lake Arenal one of the world's foremost windsurfing and kite surfing areas. Wakeboarding is gaining popularity in Costa Rica, with Lake Arenal being the center of this activity. Stand up paddling and kayaking are also popular activities for tourists visiting the lake's eastern part near the earthen dam. There is plenty of good fishing (primarily for rainbow bass) and now kayak fishing opportunities in the shallow and secluded coves. The area surrounding the lake has good hiking, biking, bird watching, and horseback riding opportunities.

== Plate tectonics ==
According to Montero et al., the fault system that borders the Guanacaste Volcanic Arc Sliver on the north-west side of Costa Rica goes from the south-east end of Lake Arenal area to an area near the town of Barranca on the Gulf of Nicoya.

== Gallery ==
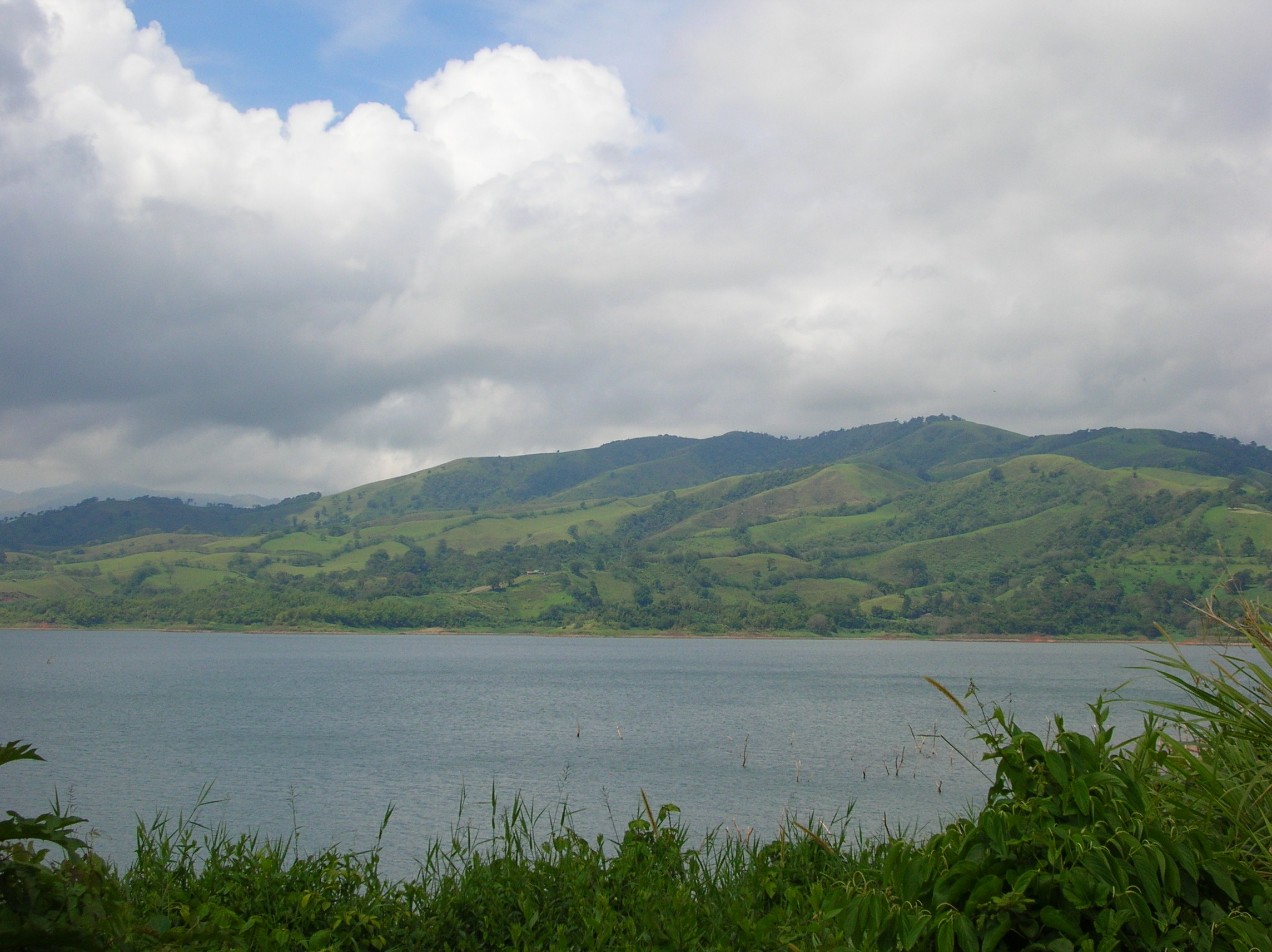

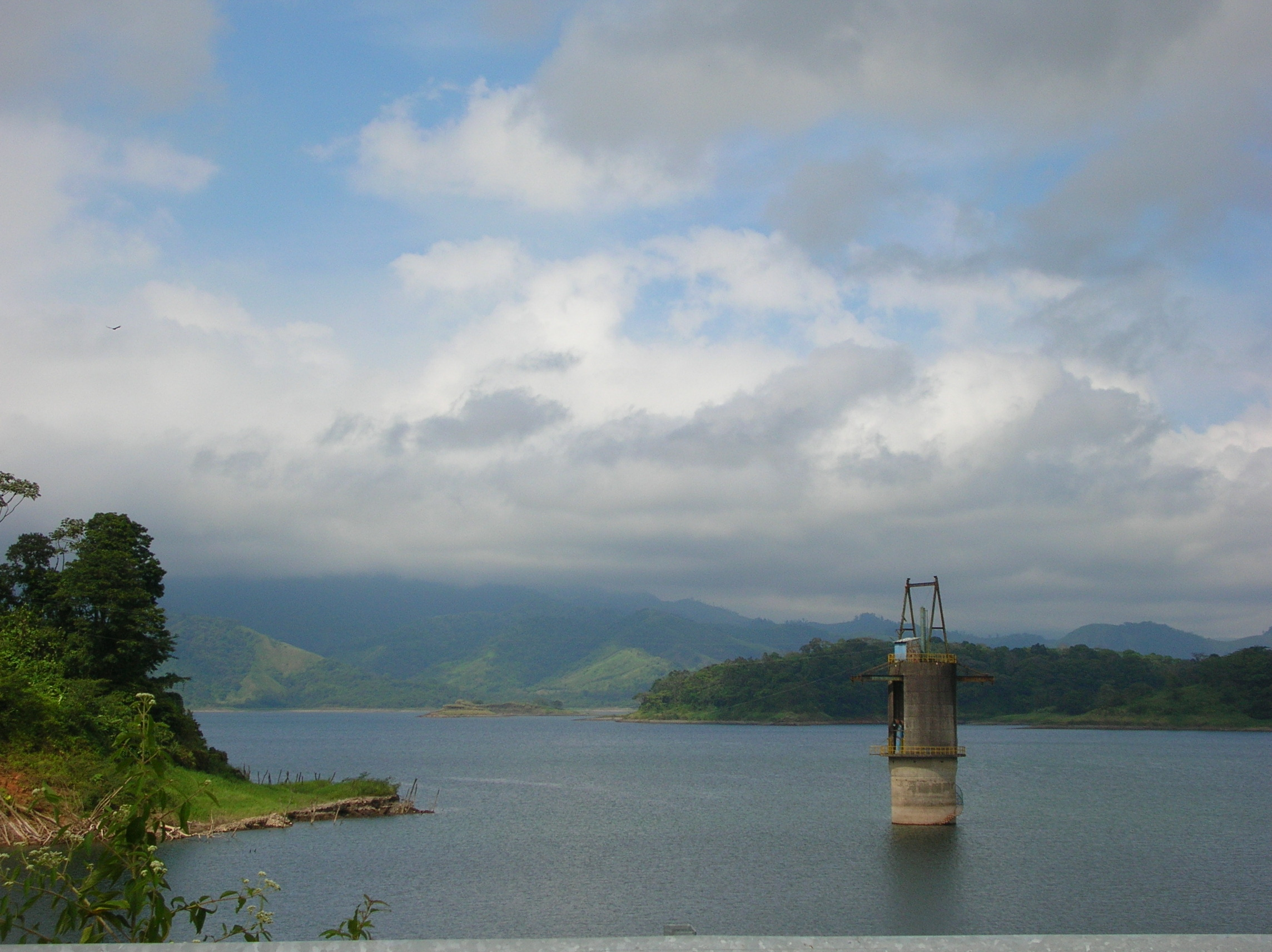
Hydroelectricity on Lake Arenal.

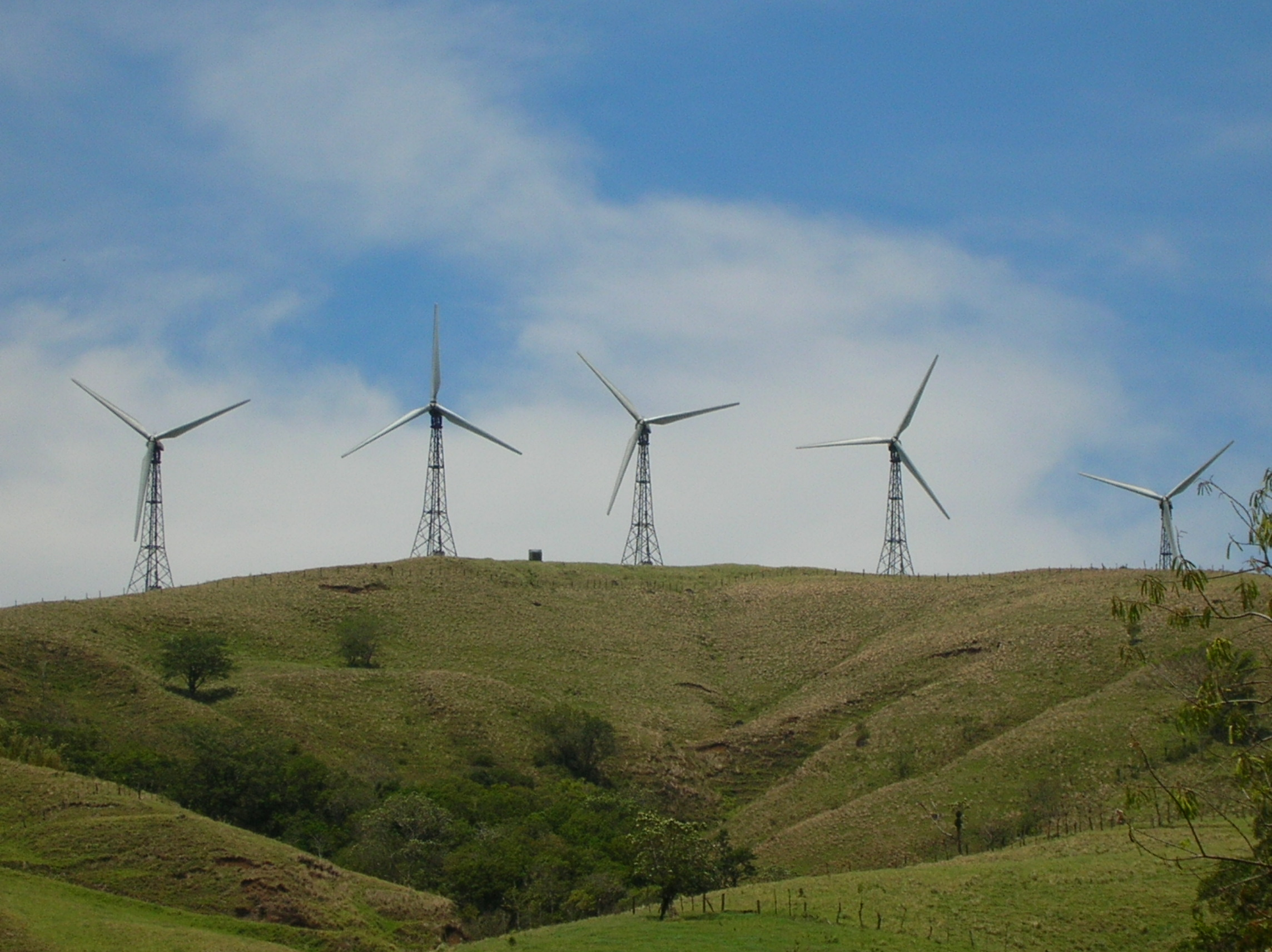
Wind turbines on Santa Rosa, south-west of Lake Arenal.

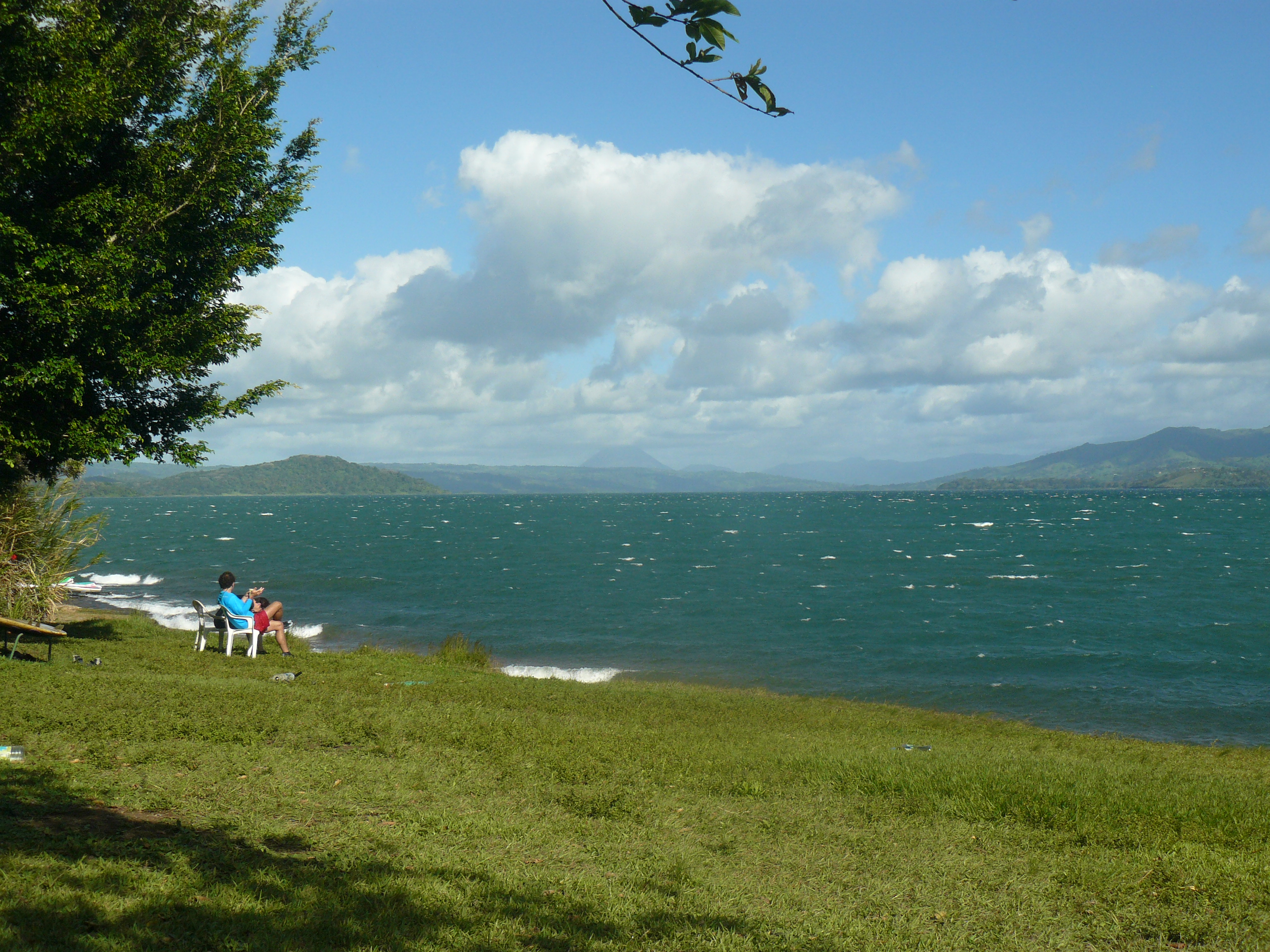

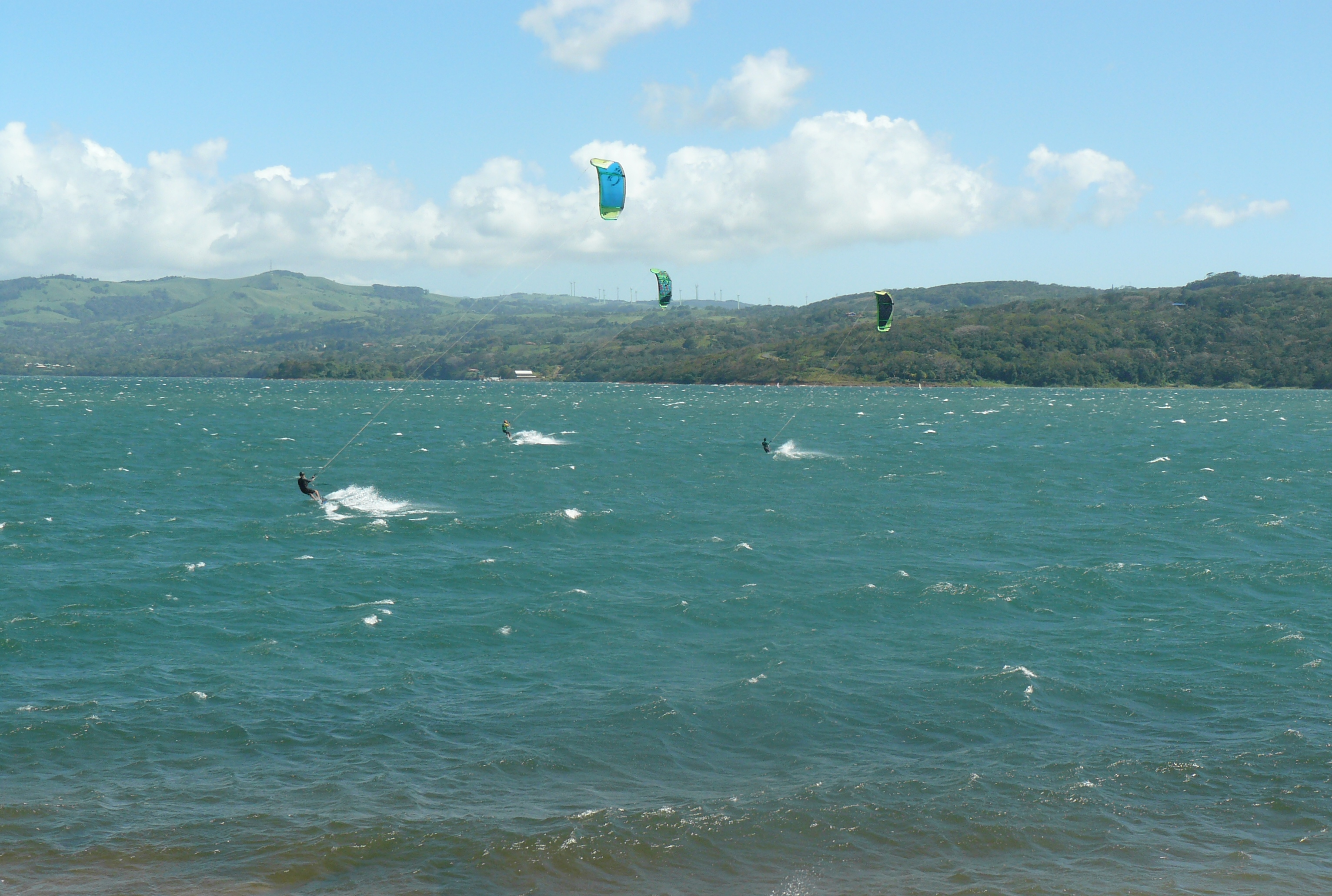

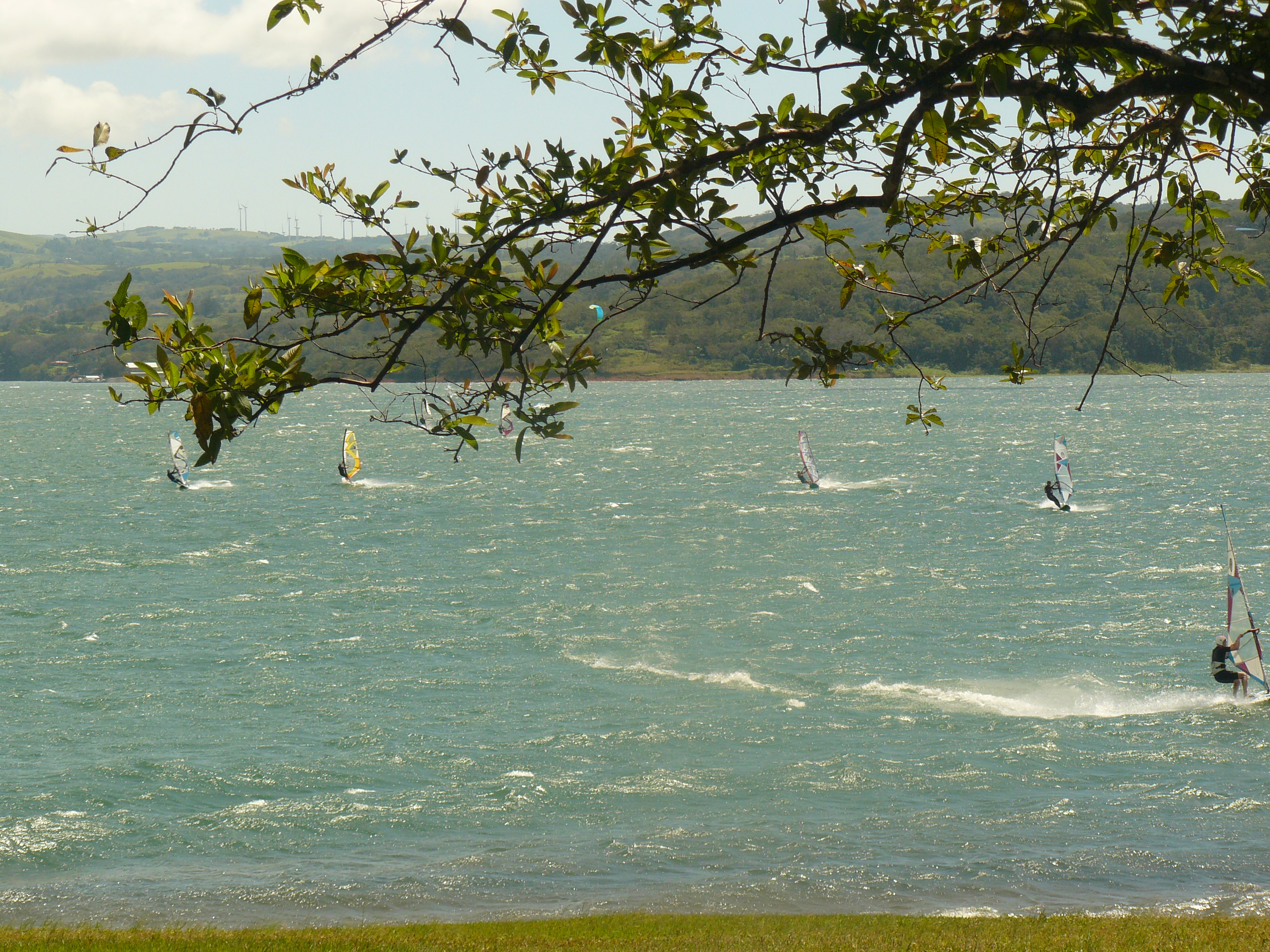

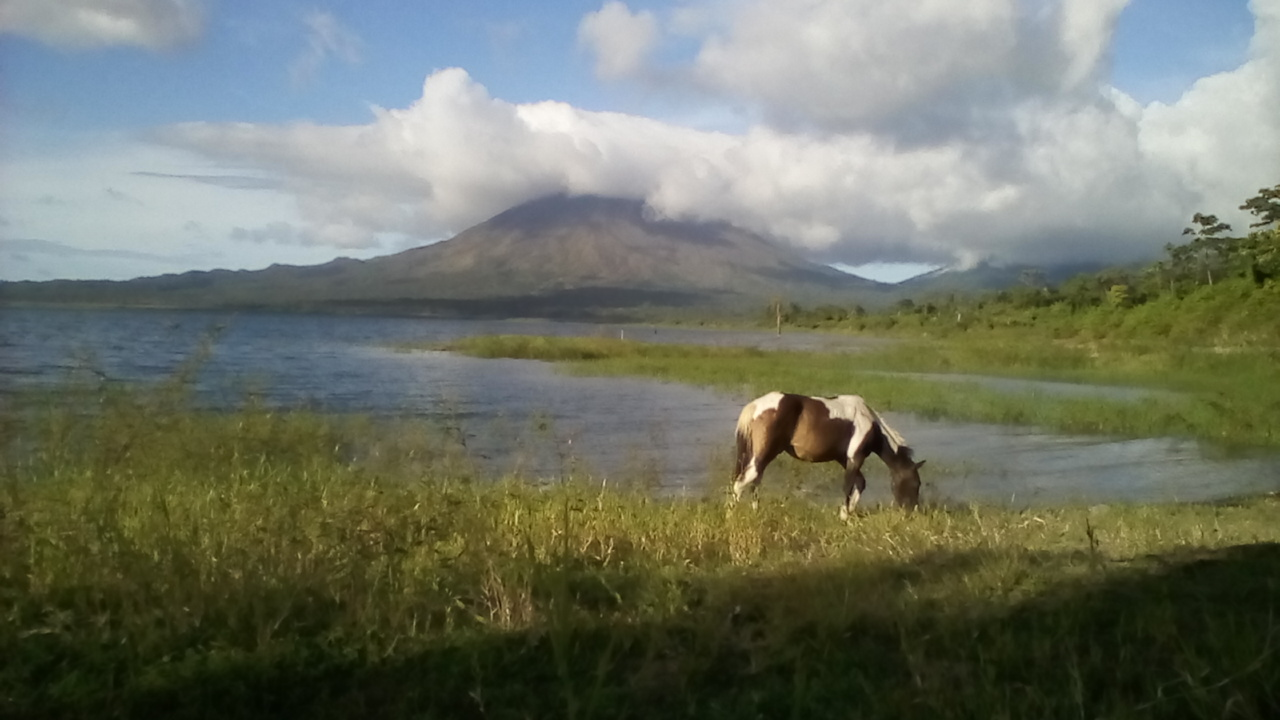
Horse grazing on the shore of the Lake with the Arenal Volcano in the background.

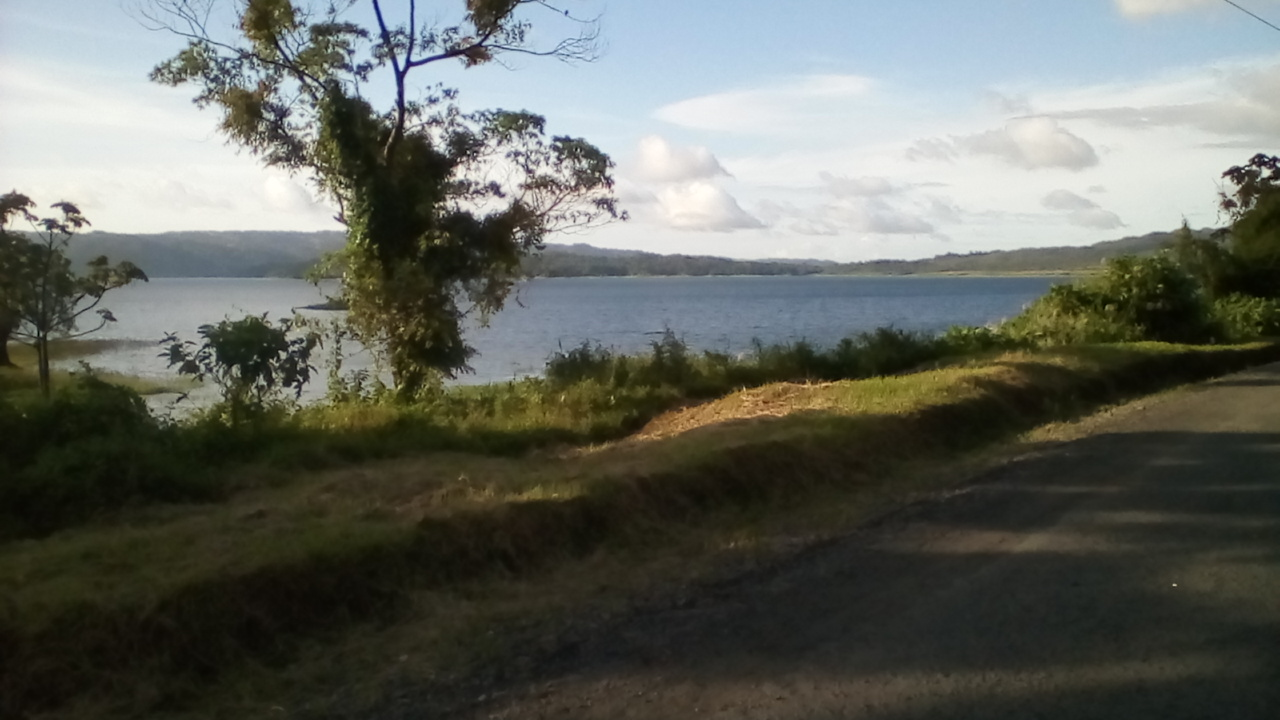
View of the lake from the village of El Fosforo, on the southeastern shore.

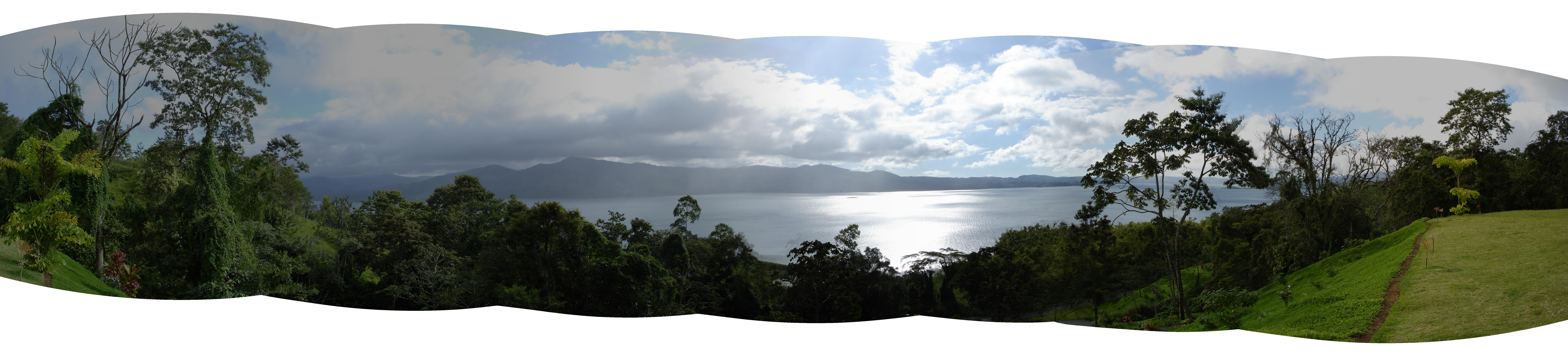
Panorama of the area around Arenal Lake.

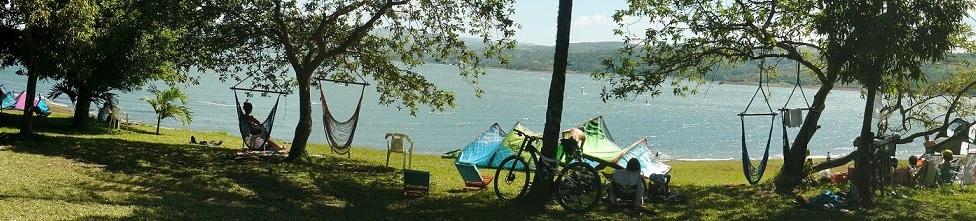
Lake Arenal windsurf and kite surf beach at the Tico Wind peninsula
