= Florencia, San Carlos =

District in San Carlos canton, Alajuela province, Costa Rica

Florencia
- District
- Interactive map of Florencia
- Florencia district location in Costa Rica
- Coordinates: 10.3665081°N 84.4813611°W
- Country: Costa Rica
- Province: Alajuela
- Canton: San Carlos

Area
  - Total: 198.54 km^{2} (76.66 sq mi)
- Elevation: 225 m (738 ft)

Population (2011)
  - Total: 15,149
  - Density: 76.302/km^{2} (197.62/sq mi)
- Time zone: UTC−06:00
- Postal code: 21002

Florencia is a district of the San Carlos canton, in the Alajuela province of Costa Rica.

== Location ==
It is located in the northern region of the country and borders with 3 districts; Cutris to the north, La Tigra to the west (also with the canton of San Ramón), Quesada and La Palmera to the east. While to the south it borders with the canton of Zarcero.

Its head, the city of Florencia, is located 9.7 km (22 minutes) to the NW of Ciudad Quesada and 116 km (2 hours 32 minutes) to the NW of San José the capital of the nation.

== Geography ==
Florencia has an area of 198.54 km^{2} and a mean elevation of 225 metres. It has a range between 100 and 600 meters above sea level.

This variation of altitude is due to the fact that the southern part of the district is formed by the mountain foothills of the Central Mountain Range, while to the north, the territory follows a clear descent towards the plains of San Carlos.

== Demographics ==
Historical population
Census	Pop.	±% p.a.
1927	1,415	—
1950	4,299	+4.95%
1963	7,394	+4.26%
1973	7,237	−0.21%
1984	7,459	+0.28%
2000	12,444	+3.25%
2011	15,149	+1.80%
2022	19,587	+2.36%
Source: Instituto Nacional de Estadística y Censos; Centro Centroamericano de Población

For the 2011 census, Florencia had a population of 15,149 inhabitants. It is the sixth most populated of the canton, behind of Quesada, Aguas Zarcas, Pocosol and La Fortuna.

== Transportation ==
=== Road transportation ===
The district is covered by the following road routes:

- National Route 4
- National Route 35
- National Route 141
- National Route 739
- National Route 748

== Economy ==
Florence, the head, has health services, educational, financial, legal, lodging, post office, car repair, construction.

Entertainment services are also offered in nightly venues.

In terms of trade, the sale of fast foods, groceries, shoes, clothes, appliances and various accessories stands out.

== See also ==
- Canton of San Carlos
- District of Quesada
- District of Buenavista
- District of Aguas Zarcas
- District of Venecia
- District of Pital
- District of La Fortuna
- District of La Tigra
- District of La Palmera
- District of Venado
- District of Cutris
- District of Monterrey
- District of Pocosol
- List of districts of Costa Rica
