= Palmito cheese =

Type of Costa Rican cheese

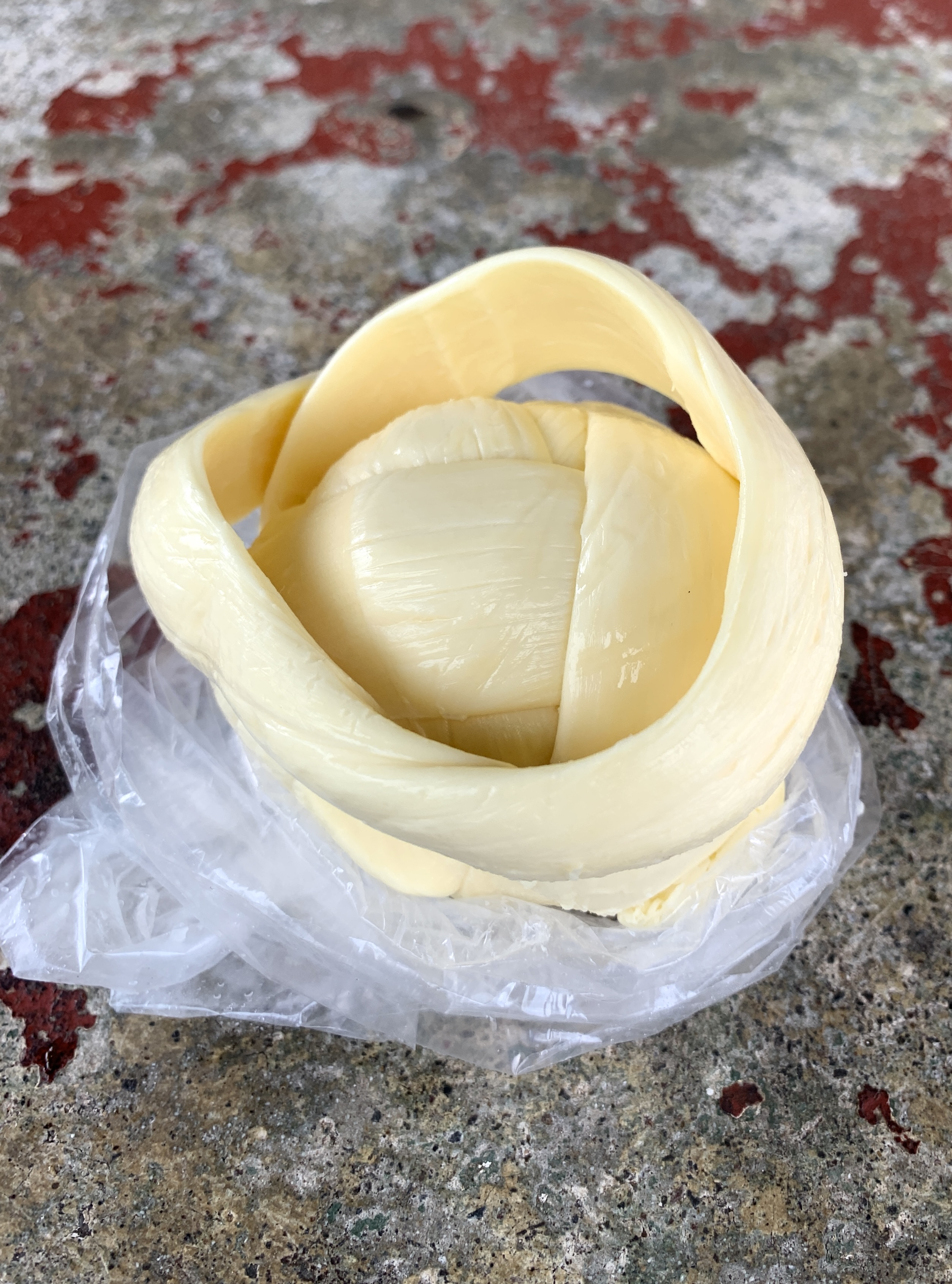
- Palmito cheese
- Country of origin: Costa Rica
- Source of milk: Cow, usually Holestein, Jersey, or a crossbreed
- Pasteurised: Sometimes
- Texture: Semi-hard
- Fat content: 16-24%

Palmito cheese (Spanish: Queso palmito) is a popular fresh cheese from Costa Rica that resembles a knotted ball of string cheese. It has been described as light, salty, and stringy with a texture comparable to mozzarella cheese. It is similar to Oaxaca cheese in Mexico. It is a type of stretched-curd cheese made by using the pasta filata technique. It is thought that the technology to produce the cheese came from Italian immigrants. At an expo in Zarcero in 2007, a 132 kg ball of palmito cheese was created by local cheesemakers.

== History ==
Palmito cheese originates from Cutris, a district in San Carlos, one of the largest dairy producers in Costa Rica. It was first named queso arrollado ("rolled cheese") and did not enjoy much popularity. The production then moved to La Palmito de Naranjo, and later became known as queso palmito. The word palmito refers to heart of palm, which the cheese's appearance also resembles.

== Background ==
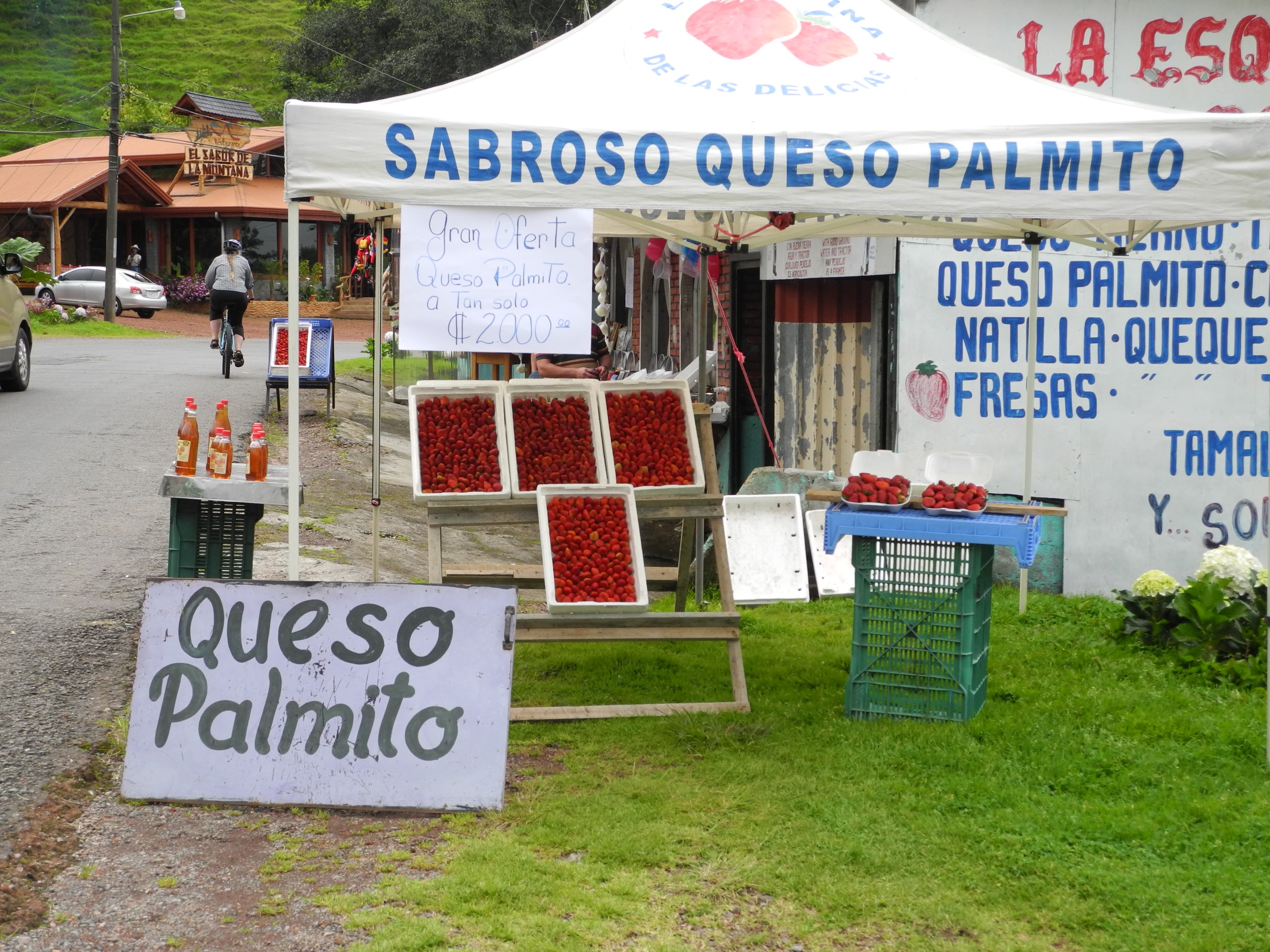
Roadside stand in Alajuela selling palmito cheese and strawberries.

Dairy farming has increased in Costa Rica throughout the last couple of decades. About 95% of the cows in the country are Holstein, Jersey, or a cross between them. Milk production increased 1.15 times from 2005 to 2009. In Costa Rica, per capita cheese consumption is about 8.4 kg per inhabitant per year. About 95% is consumed as fresh cheeses and 5% as mature cheeses, which reflects the overall trend in Central America. Costa Rica has an Official Standard for Cheese, established in 1988, that sets definitions and guidelines for cheeses.

In Costa Rica, the artisanal cheese-making sector is considered the most important in the cheese market. Turrialba, Bagaces, and Palmito are the three main cheeses produced. They similarly use rennet for the coagulation of the casein but differ in the treatment of curd and pressing conditions that affect the cheeses' moisture, fat, and salt content.

Palmito cheese is mainly produced in the canton of Zarcero in the province of Alajuela. It is manufactured in the regions of San Carlos, Santa María de Pocosol, Nuevo Arenal, Venado, Guatuso, Patasto, Aguas Zarcas and Coopevega. It can be purchased at supermarkets, shops, roadside stands, and farmers markets.

== Description ==
Palmito cheese is a type of string cheese with a shiny surface and no rind. The cheese is an acidic fresh cheese with a pH of 6.6. It is made with fresh whole cow's milk. It has a fat content of 16 to 24% and a moisture content of 46 to 58%. It is considered a medium-fat semi-hard cheese. It is compact and hard to cut. The color is creamy white to slightly yellow.

== Production ==
A high proportion of the cheese is produced by small producers in an artisanal way.

Raw milk is first collected from the cow. The milk undergoes pasteurization by warming the milk to 50 to 55 degrees Celsius for 30 minutes with constant agitation. It is then cooled to 35 to 37 degrees Celsius. The milk then undergoes fermentation and curdling. The next step is the cutting of the curd, and afterwards it rests for 45 to 60 minutes. Then, after the whey is drained, the curd is kneaded. It is shaped by manually rolling it and cooling it in cold water to give it its characteristic shape. Next, the cheese is then rolled, salted, and molded. Finally, it is packaged and stored.

== See also ==
- List of cheeses
