= Quesada, San Carlos =

District in San Carlos canton, Alajuela province, Costa Rica

Quesada
- District
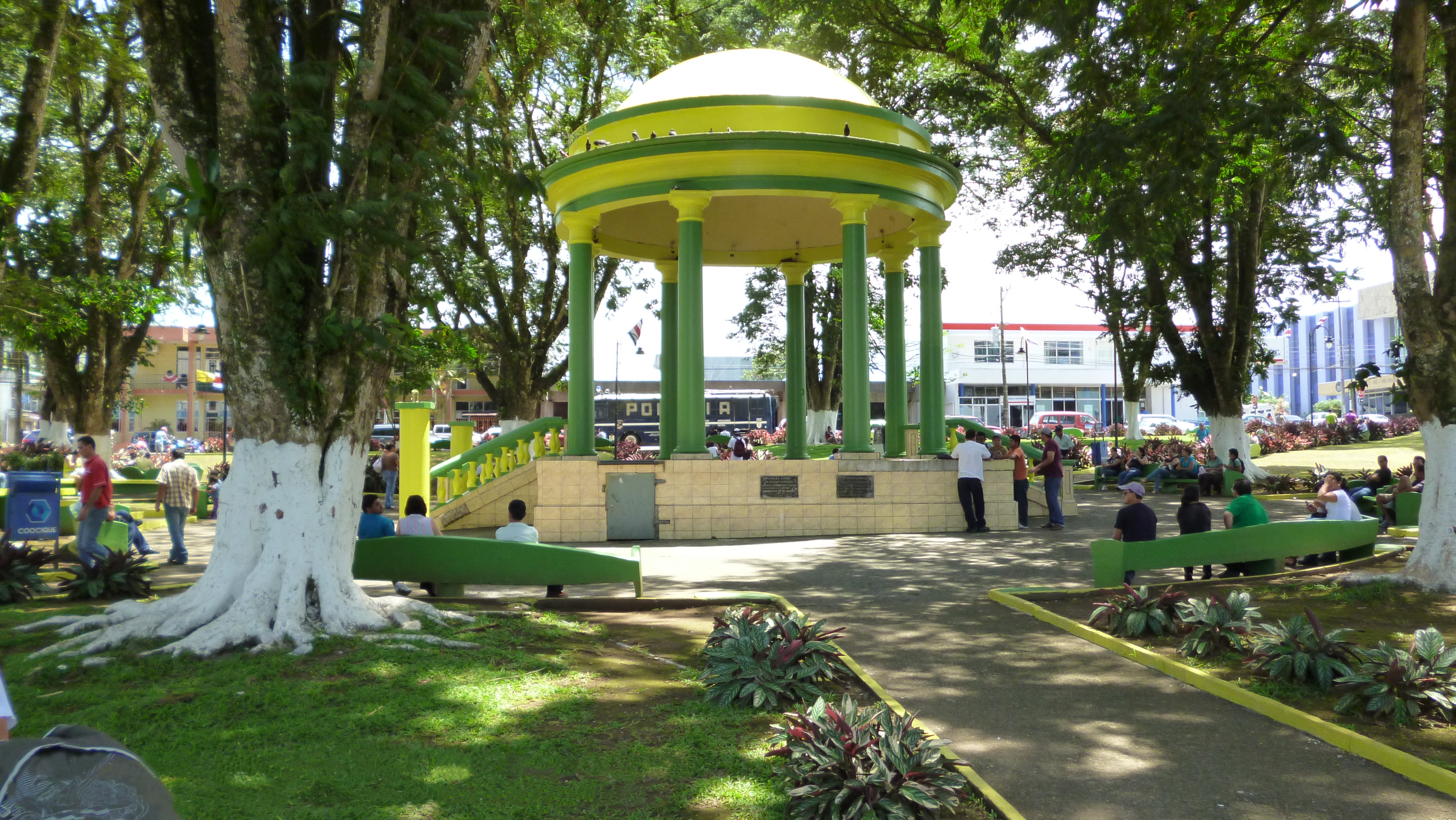
- Central park of Ciudad Quesada
- Quesada district
- Quesada district location in Costa Rica
- Coordinates: 10.3440686°N 84.4198985°W
- Country: Costa Rica
- Province: Alajuela
- Canton: San Carlos

Government
  - Syndic: Adolfo Enrique Vargas Aragonés (CUSC)

Area
  - Total: 144 km^{2} (56 sq mi)
- Elevation: 656 m (2,152 ft)

Population (2011)
  - Total: 42,060
  - Density: 292/km^{2} (756/sq mi)
- Time zone: UTC−06:00
- Postal code: 21001
- Climate: Af

Quesada is a district of the San Carlos canton, in the Alajuela province of Costa Rica. It is the head city of the canton of San Carlos. Although Ciudad Quesada is the official name, it is commonly referred to by the area name of San Carlos. Ciudad Quesada is also the most populous city in the canton of San Carlos.

The city is the economic and political center of the region, especially for the agricultural and dairy industries. The Quesada district and its surrounding areas produce about 65% of all milk in Costa Rica.

== Geography ==
Quesada has an area of 144 km^{2} and an elevation of 656 metres. It is located at the foot of the Cordillera Central (Central Mountain Range) on the southern edge of the San Carlos Plain, an expansive lowland that forms a major part of the Caribbean slope in northern Costa Rica. It is 79 km northwest of the provincial capital city of Alajuela and 90.9 km from the national capital city of San José.

== History ==
The city was first called La Unión, which was later changed to Villa Quesada. Villa Quesada was granted the title of "Ciudad" (City) by law on July 8, 1953.

== Demographics ==
Historical population
Census	Pop.	±% p.a.
1883	303	—
1927	1,749	+4.06%
1950	5,054	+4.72%
1963	11,689	+6.66%
1973	17,027	+3.83%
1984	21,696	+2.23%
2000	36,365	+3.28%
2011	42,060	+1.33%
2022	46,975	+1.01%
Source: Instituto Nacional de Estadística y Censos; Centro Centroamericano de Población

For the 2011 census, Quesada had a population of 42,060 inhabitants.

== Transportation ==
=== Road transportation ===
The district is covered by the following road routes:

- National Route 140
- National Route 141
- National Route 748

== Economy ==
The city is a major commercial center for ranching and agricultural enterprises in the surrounding area. It is known for its leather goods, as well as for its dairy production. The city harbours some important manufacturing plants related to the agribusiness sector.

This city harbors facilities of Costa Rica's largest dairy cooperative in order to produce cheese and powder milk. It also has a R&D center operating in the same facilities Dos Pinos.

=== Tourism ===
There are several hot springs in the area, some of which have developed into resorts, attracting Costa Ricans and foreign tourists.

=== Nearby places of interest ===
Zoológico La Marina is a private nonprofit zoo operated by the Alfaro family on five hectares of their cattle ranch. There are more than 450 species of animals and birds on display, most of which were confiscated by the government from illegal private ownership. The facility also maintains a successful breeding program of tapirs, an increasingly endangered species. It is 11 kilometers northeast of Ciudad Quesada on the road to Aguas Zarcas.

== Sports ==
The town's football club is A.D. San Carlos, who have spent over 25 years in the Costa Rican Primera División. They play their home games at the Estadio Carlos Ugalde Álvarez.

== See also ==
- Canton of San Carlos
- District of Florencia
- District of Buenavista
- District of Aguas Zarcas
- District of Venecia
- District of Pital
- District of La Fortuna
- District of La Tigra
- District of La Palmera
- District of Venado
- District of Cutris
- District of Monterrey
- District of Pocosol
- List of districts of Costa Rica
