= Venecia, San Carlos =

District in San Carlos canton, Alajuela province, Costa Rica

Venecia
- District
- Venecia district
- Venecia district location in Costa Rica
- Coordinates: 10.335734°N 84.2859415°W
- Country: Costa Rica
- Province: Alajuela
- Canton: San Carlos
- Creation: 16 October 1935

Area
  - Total: 132.44 km^{2} (51.14 sq mi)
- Elevation: 428 m (1,404 ft)

Population (2011)
  - Total: 9,638
  - Density: 72.77/km^{2} (188.5/sq mi)
- Time zone: UTC−06:00
- Postal code: 21005

Venecia is a district of the San Carlos canton, in the Alajuela province of Costa Rica.

== Toponymy ==
Named after Venice in Italy, due to the numerous rivers that give life to it.

== History ==
Venecia was created on 16 October 1935 by Acuerdo Ejecutivo 110.

== Geography ==
Venecia has an area of 132.44 km^{2} which makes it the tenth district of the canton by area and an elevation of 428 metres.

It is located in the northern region of the country and borders with 2 districts; Pital to the north, Aguas Zarcas to the west. While at the border with the cantons of Rio Cuarto to the east and Sarchí to the south.

Its head, the town of Venecia, is located 26.8 km (43 minutes) to the NW of Ciudad Quesada and 80.4 km (2 hours 17 minutes) to the NW of San José the capital of the nation.

It is located at an elevation of 200 to 2100 meters above sea level.

== Demographics ==
Historical population
Census	Pop.	±% p.a.
1950	1,687	—
1963	2,229	+2.17%
1973	3,261	+3.88%
1984	4,381	+2.72%
2000	7,394	+3.33%
2011	9,638	+2.44%
2022	11,695	+1.77%
Source: Instituto Nacional de Estadística y Censos; Centro Centroamericano de Población

For the 2011 census, Venecia had a population of 9,638 inhabitants.

== Transportation ==
=== Road transportation ===
The district is covered by the following road routes:

- National Route 140

== Locations ==
- Venecia (head of the district)
- Marsella
- San Cayetano
- Pueblo Viejo
- Los Alpes
- Buenos Aires
- Las Brisas
- La Unión

== Economy ==
Farmers and ranchers use the waters of the surrounding rivers to produce.

Tourist lodging and food services are offered for those who come to visit the hot springs.

Venecia, the head, has health services, educational, restaurants, hotels and supermarkets.
