= Zapote District =

Zapote District may refer to:

- Zapote District, San José, in San José (canton), San José Province, Costa Rica
- Zapote District, Zarcero, in Zarcero (canton), Alajuela Province, Costa Rica
