= Río Cuarto District =

District in Río Cuarto canton, Alajuela province, Costa Rica

Río Cuarto
- District
- Río Cuarto district
- Río Cuarto district location in Costa Rica
- Coordinates: 10.3183066°N 84.2232236°W
- Country: Costa Rica
- Province: Alajuela
- Canton: Río Cuarto
- Creation: 11 October 2018
- Elevation: 430 m (1,410 ft)

Population (2011)
  - Total: 11,074
- Time zone: UTC−06:00
- Postal code: 21601

Río Cuarto is a district of the Río Cuarto canton, in the Alajuela province of Costa Rica.

== History ==
Río Cuarto was created on 11 October 2018 by Acuerdo Ejecutivo N°044-2018-MGP.

== Geography ==
Río Cuarto has an area of km^{2} and an elevation of 430 metres.

== Demographics ==
Historical population
Census	Pop.	±% p.a.
2022	4,562	—
Source: Instituto Nacional de Estadística y Censos; Centro Centroamericano de Población

For the 2011 census, Río Cuarto had not been created, but in the records there was a population of 11,074 inhabitants. However, its inhabitants were part of Río Cuarto canton when it was a district of Grecia canton, and therefore this figure includes the population of the Santa Rita and Santa Isabel districts created in 2018.

== Transportation ==
=== Road transportation ===
The district is covered by the following road routes:

- National Route 140
- National Route 708
- National Route 744
