= Río Cuarto (canton) =

Canton in Alajuela province, Costa Rica

- Canton
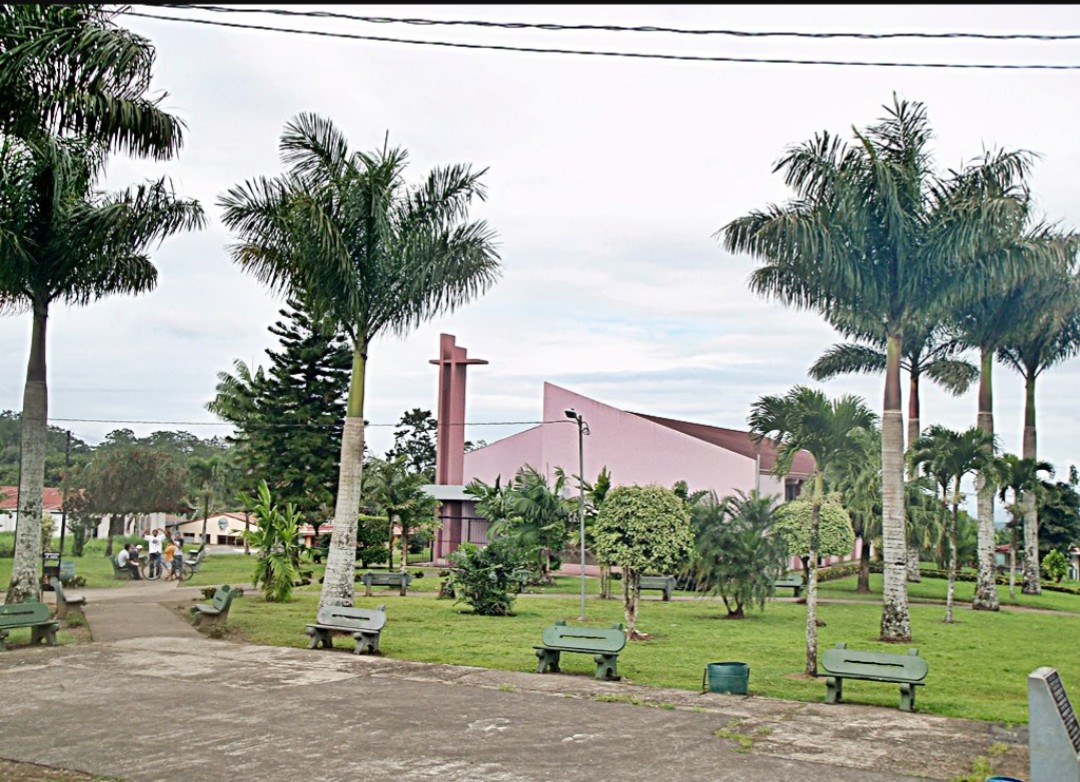
- Rio Cuarto Central Park

- Flag Seal
- Río Cuarto canton
- Río Cuarto canton location in Alajuela Province Río Cuarto canton location in Costa Rica
- Coordinates: 10.407618°N 84.2134503°W
- Country: Costa Rica
- Province: Alajuela
- Creation: 20 April 2018
- Head city: Río Cuarto
- Districts: Districts: Río Cuarto; Santa Rita; Santa Isabel

Government
  - Type: Municipality
  - Body: Municipalidad de Río Cuarto

Area
  - Total: 254.2 km^{2} (98.1 sq mi)
- Elevation: 277 m (909 ft)

Population (2011)
  - Total: 11,074
  - Density: 43.56/km^{2} (112.8/sq mi)
- Time zone: UTC−06:00
- Canton code: 216

Río Cuarto is a canton in the Alajuela province of Costa Rica. The head city is in Río Cuarto district.

== History ==
Río Cuarto, whose name translates to Fourth River, was created on 20 April 2018 by decree 9440.

It was originally a district of Grecia, however not on contiguous land as it was separated from Grecia when Sarchí canton, which was also part of Grecia originally, became a canton in 1949. After agreement of the Legislative Assembly of Costa Rica in second debate the Thursday 30 March 2017, Río Cuarto district became a canton, then in 2018 three districts were created in the canton.

== Geography ==
Río Cuarto has an area of 254.2 km^{2} (98.1 sq mi) and a mean elevation of 277 metres.

It is located to the north of the Poás Volcano. It limits to the north and the west with the canton of San Carlos, to the east and also to the north with the canton of Sarapiquí to the south with the cantons of Alajuela and Zarcero.

Its head city is Río Cuarto, which is located 70.8 km (44.0 mi) north of San José, the nation's capital, of which by road it is around two hours taking Route 126.

The vegetation overflows with green, multicolored flowers, fruits and trees. The fauna is composed of dozens of species, some with animals as striking as the caribbean monkeys, sloths, and birds of all tones.

The type of vegetation is typical of the Humid Tropical Forest, characterized by the presence of trees up to 40 meters in height, ferns, epiphytic plants and mosses. The area also has abundant fruit plantations, ornamental and medicinal plants.

=== Area ===
The canton has an area of 254.20 km^{2} (98.15 sq mi) and is located between 10°24'44" north latitude and 84°12'56" west longitude.

=== Dimensions ===
It has a maximum width of 38 km and is delimited by the rivers Toro and Caño Negro, and the massif of the Congo Volcano.

Its territory has an elongated form that extends from northeast to southwest.

=== Altitude ===
The territory has an altitude of between 100 and 1800 meters above sea level.

It presents these great variations of altitude, since in the south zone of the canton are the foothills of the central volcanic mountain range (reaching its maximum point in the already mentioned Congo Volcano), whereas in north direction the land descends until its lowest point in the surroundings of the town of San Rafael.

=== Climate ===
Its climate is temperate humid, between 16 °C to 28 °C, depending on the locality.

=== Geology ===
It has materials of volcanic origin of the Quaternary period. Also predominant are Pleistocene rocks, as well as lahar is, recent and present volcanic buildings, and Holocene pyroclastics. The presence of this large amount of volcanic material explains the fertility of the soils of the canton.

=== Geomorphology ===
The main volcanic massif is the Poás Volcano in the south, to which belong other subunits such as the Congo Volcano, the Hule Caldera (which forms the Lake Congo and Lake Hule) and the maar that forms Lake Río Cuarto.

=== Hydrography ===
The water resource in the area is also abundant; proof of this is the presence of high waterfalls, lakes, rivers and frequent falls. And the weather is cool, although a bit rainy at this time of year.

The main rivers are the Toro, Río Cuarto, Sardinal, María Aguilar and Caño Negro rivers. The Caño Negro, Pozo Azul and Quebrada Gata rivers are tributaries of the Toro River. All these rivers discharge their waters in the Sarapiquí River, that takes them to the San Juan River.

== Districts ==
The canton of Río Cuarto is subdivided into the following districts:

1. Río Cuarto
2. Santa Rita
3. Santa Isabel

== Demographics ==
Historical population
Census	Pop.	±% p.a.
1927	517	—
1950	1,216	+3.79%
1963	2,116	+4.35%
1973	2,840	+2.99%
1984	3,341	+1.49%
2000	7,744	+5.39%
2011	11,074	+3.31%
2022	14,418	+2.43%
Source: Instituto Nacional de Estadística y Censos; Centro Centroamericano de Población

For the 2011 census, Río Cuarto district had a population of 11,074 inhabitants, as the population of the district became that of the canton, the historical population details are equivalent since 1927.

== Transportation ==
=== Road transportation ===
The canton is covered by the following road routes:

- National Route 4
- National Route 140
- National Route 708
- National Route 744
- National Route 745

== Economy ==
Produce, milk, beef, pork, chicken meat, pineapple, cassava, electric power, ornamental plants, among others.
