= Zarcero =

District in Zarcero canton, Alajuela province, Costa Rica

- District
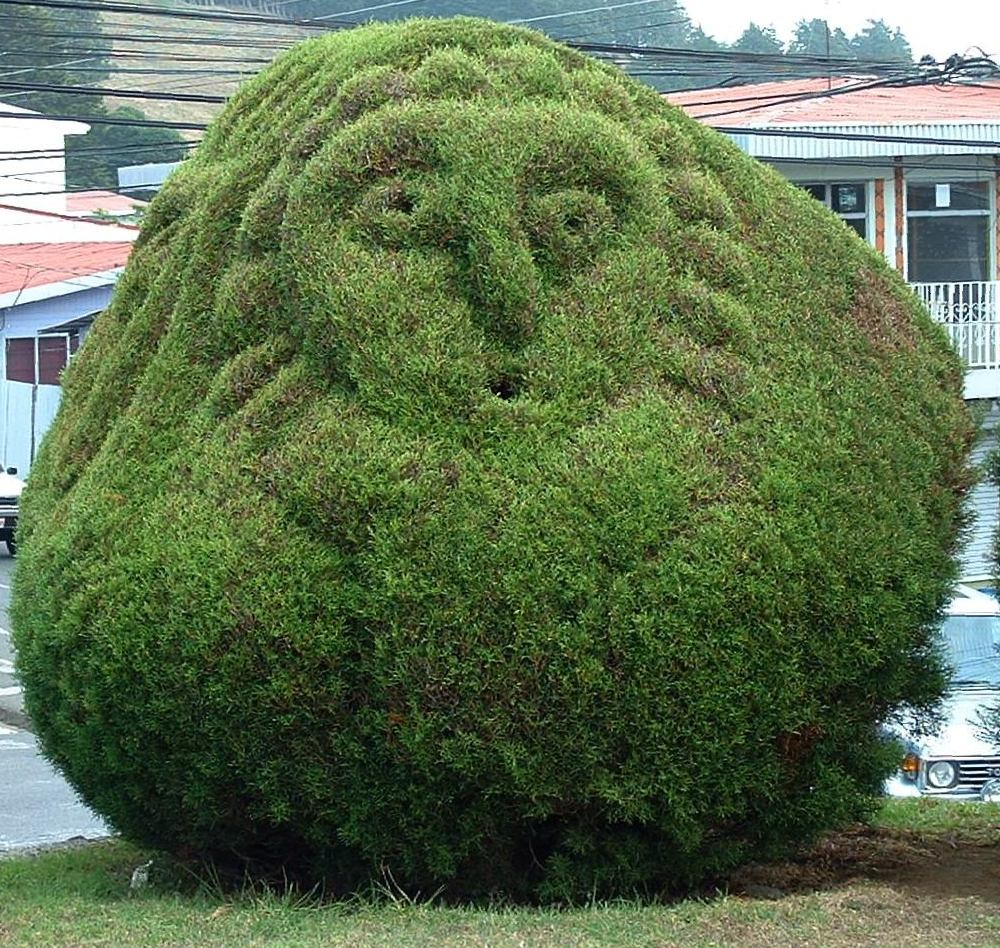
- Topiary at Parque Francisco Alvarado in Zarcero
- Zarcero district
- Zarcero district location in Costa Rica
- Coordinates: 10.1890471°N 84.37505°W
- Country: Costa Rica
- Province: Alajuela
- Canton: Zarcero

Area
  - Total: 11.72 km^{2} (4.53 sq mi)
- Elevation: 1,736 m (5,696 ft)

Population (2011)
  - Total: 4,004
  - Density: 341.6/km^{2} (884.8/sq mi)
- Time zone: UTC−06:00
- Postal code: 21101

Zarcero is a district of the Zarcero canton, in the Alajuela province of Costa Rica.

== History ==
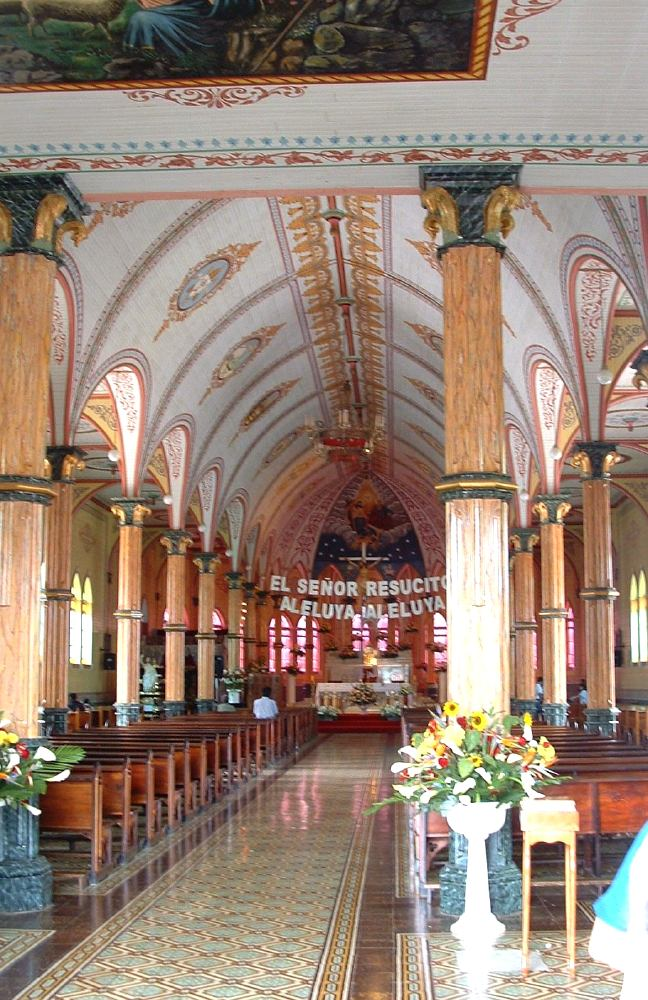
Interior of Iglesia de San Rafael, Zarcero, Costa Rica.

Zarcero was granted the title of "ciudad" (city) by a law on 24 July 1918.

== Geography ==
Zarcero has an area of 11.72 km^{2} and an elevation of 1,736 metres.

It is located in the Cordillera Central (Central Mountain Range) of Costa Rica, 50 kilometers northwest of the provincial capital city of Alajuela and 27 kilometers southeast of Ciudad Quesada.

Zarcero, known for its brisk mountain climate, lies in a dairy and agricultural area also noted for the local enterprises that practice organic farming. Distinctive jams, cheese and other dairy products are among the items produced.

== Locations ==
- Barrios (neighborhoods): Cantarranas, Santa Teresita

== Demographics ==
Historical population
Census	Pop.	±% p.a.
1883	328	—
1927	791	+2.02%
1950	1,159	+1.67%
1963	1,499	+2.00%
1973	2,148	+3.66%
1984	2,517	+1.45%
2000	3,790	+2.59%
2011	4,004	+0.50%
2022	4,755	+1.58%
Source: Instituto Nacional de Estadística y Censos; Centro Centroamericano de Población

For the 2011 census, Zarcero had a population of 4,004 inhabitants.

== Transportation ==
=== Road transportation ===
The district is covered by the following road routes:

- National Route 141
- National Route 741

== Places of interest ==
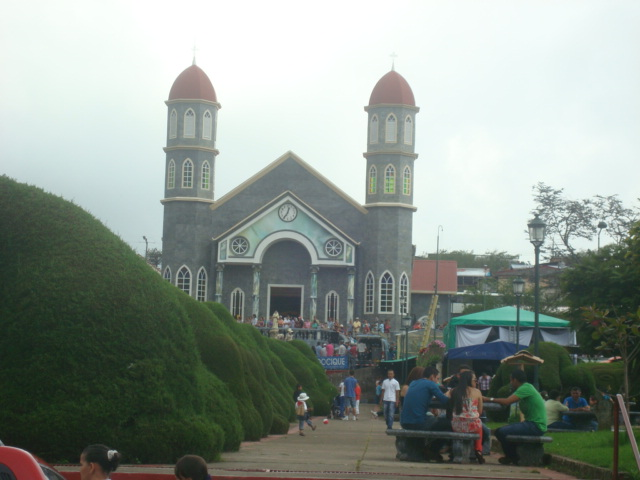

Parque Francisco Alvarado: The park sits in front of the church at the town center. It is noted for its topiary garden produced and maintained by Evangelista Blanco since the 1960s. Shrubs in the park have been trimmed into the shapes of various animals, including some that are quite abstract and bizarre.

Iglesia de San Rafael: Zarcero's pink and blue church was constructed in 1895. The interior features very nice paintings of the Stations of the Cross. Materials for the construction of the church are not what they seem. Columns are painted to look like marble, and the exterior is metal siding, not brick as it appears.
