= National Route 746 (Costa Rica) =

National Road Route in Costa Rica

National Tertiary Route 746
- Ruta nacional terciaria 746

Route information
- Maintained by Ministry of Public Works and Transport
- Length: 4.900 km (3.045 mi)

Major junctions
- West end: Route 250
- East end: Route 745

Location
- Country: Costa Rica
- Provinces: Alajuela

Highway system
- National Road Network of Costa Rica
← Route 745	→ Route 747

National Tertiary Route 746, or just Route 746 (Spanish: Ruta Nacional Terciaria 746, or Ruta 746) is a National Road Route of Costa Rica, located in the Alajuela province.

== Description ==
This route is an almost straight west to east road between two other national routes.

In Alajuela province the route covers San Carlos canton (Pital district).

== Junction list ==
The entire route is in Pital district.

km	mi	Destinations	Notes
0.00	0.00	Route 250	
4.90	3.04	Route 745	
