= National Route 751 (Costa Rica) =

National Road Route in Costa Rica

National Tertiary Route 751
- Ruta nacional terciaria 751

Route information
- Maintained by Ministry of Public Works and Transport
- Length: 26.690 km (16.584 mi)

Location
- Country: Costa Rica
- Provinces: Alajuela

Highway system
- National Road Network of Costa Rica
← Route 750	→ Route 752

National Tertiary Route 751, or just Route 751 (Spanish: Ruta Nacional Terciaria 751, or Ruta 751) is a National Road Route of Costa Rica, located in the Alajuela province.

== Description ==
In Alajuela province the route covers San Carlos canton (Aguas Zarcas andCutris districts).
