= National Route 141 (Costa Rica) =

National Road Route in Costa Rica

National Secondary Route 141
- Ruta nacional secundaria 141

Route information
- Maintained by Ministry of Public Works and Transport
- Length: 86.705 km (53.876 mi)

Location
- Country: Costa Rica
- Provinces: Alajuela

Highway system
- National Road Network of Costa Rica
← Route 140	→ Route 142

National Secondary Route 141, or just Route 141 (Spanish: Ruta Nacional Secundaria 141, or Ruta 141) is a National Road Route of Costa Rica, located in the Alajuela province.

== Description ==
In Alajuela province the route covers Naranjo canton (Naranjo, San Miguel, San José, Cirrí Sur, and San Juan districts), San Carlos canton (Quesada, Florencia, Buenavista, La Fortuna, and La Tigra districts), and Zarcero canton (Zarcero, Laguna, Tapezco, Zapote, Brisas districts).

== History ==
Landslides in this route are common in the rainy season.
