= National Route 748 (Costa Rica) =

National Road Route in Costa Rica

National Tertiary Route 748
- Ruta nacional terciaria 748

Route information
- Maintained by Ministry of Public Works and Transport
- Length: 17.900 km (11.123 mi)

Location
- Country: Costa Rica
- Provinces: Alajuela

Highway system
- National Road Network of Costa Rica
← Route 747	→ Route 749

National Tertiary Route 748, or just Route 748 (Spanish: Ruta Nacional Terciaria 748, or Ruta 748) is a National Road Route of Costa Rica, located in the Alajuela province.

== Description ==
In Alajuela province the route covers San Carlos canton (Quesada, Florencia, La Palmera districts).
