= Cureña =

District in the Sarapiquí canton, of the Heredia province, in Costa Rica

- District
- Interactive map of Cureña
- Cureña district location in Costa Rica
- Coordinates: 10.6831653°N 84.0477495°W
- Country: Costa Rica
- Province: Heredia
- Canton: Sarapiquí
- Creation: 6 October 1999

Area
  - Total: 369.02 km^{2} (142.48 sq mi)
- Elevation: 30 m (98 ft)

Population (2011)
  - Total: 951
  - Density: 2.58/km^{2} (6.67/sq mi)
- Time zone: UTC−06:00
- Postal code: 41005

Cureña is a district of the Sarapiquí canton, in the Heredia province of Costa Rica.

== History ==
Cureña was created on 6 October 1999 by Decreto Ejecutivo 28137-G.

== Location ==
It is located in the northern region of the country and borders the districts of La Virgen to the south, Puerto Viejo to the east, the province of Alajuela to the west and Nicaragua to the north.

== Geography ==
Cureña has an area of 369.02 km² and an elevation of 30 metres. It is the fourth district of the canton by area.

It presents a plain territory by dominated by the plains of Sarapiquí.

== Demographics ==
Historical population
Census	Pop.	±% p.a.
2000	759	—
2011	951	+2.07%
2022	1,531	+4.42%
Source: Instituto Nacional de Estadística y Censos; Centro Centroamericano de Población

For the 2011 census, Cureña had a population of 951 inhabitants.

== Settlements ==
The 12 population centers of the district are:

- Golfito (head of the district)
- Caño Tambor
- Copalchí
- Cureñita
- Paloseco
- Remolinito
- Tambor
- Tierrabuena
- Trinidad (Boca Sarapiquí)
- Unión del Toro
- Vuelta Cabo de Hornos
- Los Angeles del Río

== Economy ==
As in its neighboring district of Llanuras del Gaspar, agriculture (banana, pineapple, yucca and banana) is the base of the local economy.

== Transportation ==
=== Road transportation ===
The district is covered by the following road routes:

- National Route 745
