= National Route 753 (Costa Rica) =

National Road Route in Costa Rica

National Tertiary Route 753
- Ruta nacional terciaria 753

Route information
- Maintained by Ministry of Public Works and Transport
- Length: 17.780 km (11.048 mi)

Location
- Country: Costa Rica
- Provinces: Alajuela

Highway system
- National Road Network of Costa Rica
← Route 752	→ Route 755

National Tertiary Route 753, or just Route 753 (Spanish: Ruta Nacional Terciaria 753, or Ruta 753) is a National Road Route of Costa Rica, located in the Alajuela province.

== Description ==
In Alajuela province the route covers San Carlos canton (Cutris district).
