= Laguna District =

District in Zarcero canton, Alajuela province, Costa Rica

Laguna
- District
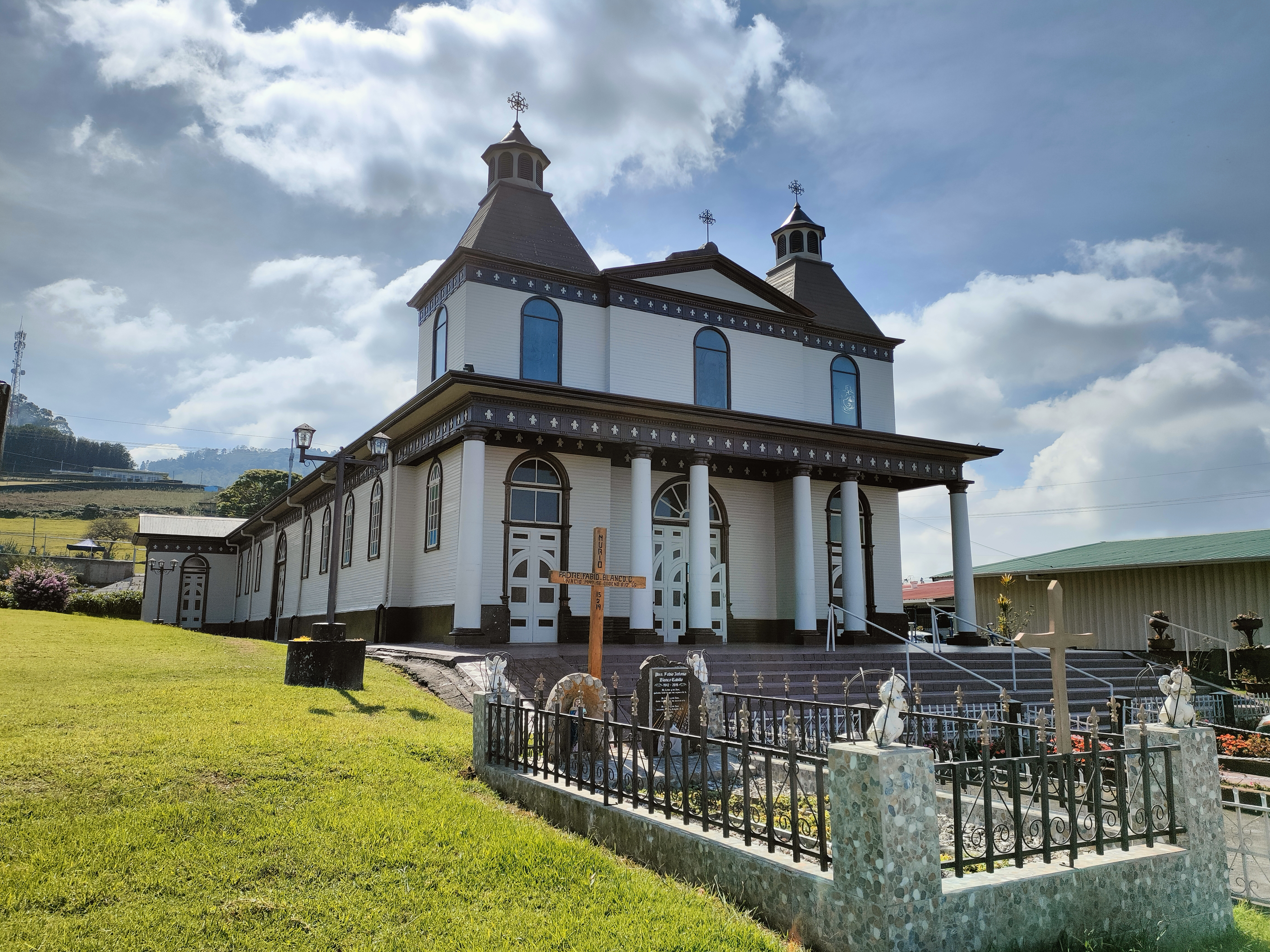
- Our Lady of the Rosary Church
- Interactive map of Laguna
- Laguna district location in Costa Rica
- Coordinates: 10.2182854°N 84.451155°W
- Country: Costa Rica
- Province: Alajuela
- Canton: Zarcero

Area
  - Total: 23.36 km^{2} (9.02 sq mi)
- Elevation: 1,840 m (6,040 ft)

Population (2011)
  - Total: 1,674
  - Density: 71.66/km^{2} (185.6/sq mi)
- Time zone: UTC−06:00
- Postal code: 21102

Laguna is a district of the Zarcero canton, in the Alajuela province of Costa Rica.

== Geography ==
Laguna has an area of 23.36 km^{2} (9.02 sq mi) and an elevation of 1,840 metres (6,040 ft).

== Locations ==
- Poblados (villages): Peña

== Demographics ==
Historical population
Census	Pop.	±% p.a.
1927	605	—
1950	701	+0.64%
1963	668	−0.37%
1973	893	+2.95%
1984	955	+0.61%
2000	1,579	+3.19%
2011	1,674	+0.53%
2022	2,044	+1.83%
Source: Instituto Nacional de Estadística y Censos; Centro Centroamericano de Población

For the 2011 census, Laguna had a population of 1,674 inhabitants.

== Transportation ==
=== Road transportation ===
The district is covered by the following road routes:

- National Route 141
