= National Route 749 (Costa Rica) =

National Road Route in Costa Rica

National Tertiary Route 749
- Ruta nacional terciaria 749

Route information
- Maintained by Ministry of Public Works and Transport
- Length: 12.035 km (7.478 mi)

Location
- Country: Costa Rica
- Provinces: Alajuela

Highway system
- National Road Network of Costa Rica
← Route 748	→ Route 750

National Tertiary Route 749, or just Route 749 (Spanish: Ruta Nacional Terciaria 749, or Ruta 749) is a National Road Route of Costa Rica, located in the Alajuela province.

== Description ==
In Alajuela province the route covers San Carlos canton (Aguas Zarcas district).
