= Brisas =

District in Zarcero canton, Alajuela province, Costa Rica

- District
- Interactive map of Brisas
- Brisas district location in Costa Rica
- Coordinates: 10.2425658°N 84.3855127°W
- Country: Costa Rica
- Province: Alajuela
- Canton: Zarcero
- Creation: 24 April 1998

Area
  - Total: 17.87 km^{2} (6.90 sq mi)
- Elevation: 1,850 m (6,070 ft)

Population (2011)
  - Total: 2,001
  - Density: 112.0/km^{2} (290.0/sq mi)
- Time zone: UTC−06:00
- Postal code: 21107

Brisas is a district of the Zarcero canton, in the Alajuela province of Costa Rica.

== History ==
Brisas was created on 24 April 1998 by Decreto Ejecutivo 26942-G.

== Geography ==
Brisas has an area of 17.87 km^{2} and an elevation of 1,850 metres.

== Locations ==
- Poblados (villages): Ángeles, Brisa, Legua

== Demographics ==
Historical population
Census	Pop.	±% p.a.
2000	1,631	—
2011	2,001	+1.88%
2022	2,602	+2.42%
Source: Instituto Nacional de Estadística y Censos; Centro Centroamericano de Población

For the 2011 census, Brisas had a population of 2,001 inhabitants.

== Transportation ==
=== Road transportation ===
The district is covered by the following road routes:

- National Route 141
