= National Route 140 (Costa Rica) =

National Road Route in Costa Rica

National Secondary Route 140
- Ruta nacional secundaria 140

Route information
- Maintained by Ministry of Public Works and Transport
- Length: 38.055 km (23.646 mi)

Location
- Country: Costa Rica
- Provinces: Alajuela

Highway system
- National Road Network of Costa Rica
← Route 139	→ Route 141

National Secondary Route 140, or just Route 140 (Spanish: Ruta Nacional Secundaria 140, or Ruta 140) is a National Road Route of Costa Rica, located in the Alajuela province.

== Description ==
In Alajuela province the route covers Alajuela canton (Sarapiquí district), San Carlos canton (Quesada, Aguas Zarcas, Venecia, and La Palmera districts), and Río Cuarto canton (Río Cuarto district).
