= National Route 227 (Costa Rica) =

National Road Route in Costa Rica

National Secondary Route 227
- Ruta nacional secundaria 227

Route information
- Maintained by Ministry of Public Works and Transport
- Length: 36.450 km (22.649 mi)

Location
- Country: Costa Rica
- Provinces: Alajuela

Highway system
- National Road Network of Costa Rica
← Route 226	→ Route 228

National Secondary Route 227, or just Route 227 (Spanish: Ruta Nacional Secundaria 227, or Ruta 227) is a National Road Route of Costa Rica located in the Alajuela province.

== Description ==
In Alajuela province the route covers San Carlos canton (Cutris and Pocosol districts).
