= Guadalupe District, Zarcero =

District in Zarcero canton, Alajuela province, Costa Rica

Guadalupe
- District
- Interactive map of Guadalupe
- Guadalupe district location in Costa Rica
- Coordinates: 10.1896493°N 84.4382811°W
- Country: Costa Rica
- Province: Alajuela
- Canton: Zarcero

Area
  - Total: 22.58 km^{2} (8.72 sq mi)
- Elevation: 1,602 m (5,256 ft)

Population (2011)
  - Total: 1,148
  - Density: 50.84/km^{2} (131.7/sq mi)
- Time zone: UTC−06:00
- Postal code: 21104

Guadalupe is a district of the Zarcero canton, in the Alajuela province of Costa Rica.

== Geography ==
Guadalupe has an area of 22.58 km^{2} and an elevation of 1,602 metres.

== Locations ==
- Poblados (villages): Anateri, Bellavista, Morelos

== Demographics ==
Historical population
Census	Pop.	±% p.a.
1927	694	—
1950	630	−0.42%
1963	452	−2.52%
1973	405	−1.09%
1984	417	+0.27%
2000	774	+3.94%
2011	1,148	+3.65%
2022	1,472	+2.29%
Source: Instituto Nacional de Estadística y Censos; Centro Centroamericano de Población

For the 2011 census, Guadalupe had a population of 1,148 inhabitants.

== Transportation ==
=== Road transportation ===
The district is covered by the following road routes:

- National Route 35, under construction.
