= National Route 741 (Costa Rica) =

National Road Route in Costa Rica

National Tertiary Route 741
- Ruta nacional terciaria 741

Route information
- Maintained by Ministry of Public Works and Transport
- Length: 16.115 km (10.013 mi)

Location
- Country: Costa Rica
- Provinces: Alajuela

Highway system
- National Road Network of Costa Rica
← Route 739	→ Route 742

National Tertiary Route 741, or just Route 741 (Spanish: Ruta Nacional Terciaria 741, or Ruta 741) is a National Road Route of Costa Rica, located in the Alajuela province.

== Description ==
In Alajuela province the route covers Zarcero canton (Zarcero, Palmira districts), Sarchí canton (Toro Amarillo district).
