= Tapesco =

District in Zarcero canton, Alajuela province, Costa Rica

Tapesco Tapezco
- District
- Tapesco district
- Tapesco district location in Costa Rica
- Coordinates: 10.2190407°N 84.4068415°W
- Country: Costa Rica
- Province: Alajuela
- Canton: Zarcero

Area
  - Total: 6.33 km^{2} (2.44 sq mi)
- Elevation: 1,821 m (5,974 ft)

Population (2011)
  - Total: 1,305
  - Density: 206/km^{2} (534/sq mi)
- Time zone: UTC−06:00
- Postal code: 21103

Tapesco, is a district of the Zarcero canton, in the Alajuela province of Costa Rica. While its official name is Tapesco as recognized in the Administrative Territorial Division, it is also seldom and colloquially written as Tapezco.

== Geography ==
Tapesco has an area of 6.33 km^{2} and an elevation of 1,821 metres.

== Demographics ==
Historical population
Census	Pop.	±% p.a.
1892	558	—
1927	661	+0.49%
1950	840	+1.05%
1963	1,007	+1.40%
1973	1,585	+4.64%
1984	1,714	+0.71%
2000	1,040	−3.07%
2011	1,305	+2.08%
2022	1,674	+2.29%
Source: Instituto Nacional de Estadística y Censos; Centro Centroamericano de Población

For the 2011 census, Tapesco had a population of 1,305 inhabitants.

== Transportation ==
=== Road transportation ===
The district is covered by the following road routes:

- National Route 141
