= National Route 747 (Costa Rica) =

National Road Route in Costa Rica

National Tertiary Route 747
- Ruta nacional terciaria 747

Route information
- Maintained by Ministry of Public Works and Transport
- Length: 7.790 km (4.840 mi)

Location
- Country: Costa Rica
- Provinces: Alajuela

Highway system
- National Road Network of Costa Rica
← Route 746	→ Route 748

National Tertiary Route 747, or just Route 747 (Spanish: Ruta Nacional Terciaria 747, or Ruta 747) is a National Road Route of Costa Rica, located in the Alajuela province.

== Description ==
In Alajuela province the route covers San Carlos canton (Aguas Zarcas, La Palmera districts).
