= National Route 744 (Costa Rica) =

National Road Route in Costa Rica

National Tertiary Route 744
- Ruta nacional terciaria 744

Route information
- Maintained by Ministry of Public Works and Transport
- Length: 13.965 km (8.677 mi)

Location
- Country: Costa Rica
- Provinces: Alajuela

Highway system
- National Road Network of Costa Rica
← Route 742	→ Route 745

National Tertiary Route 744, or just Route 744 (Spanish: Ruta Nacional Terciaria 744, or Ruta 744) is a National Road Route of Costa Rica, located in the Alajuela province.

== Description ==
In Alajuela province the route covers San Carlos canton (Pital district), Río Cuarto canton (Río Cuarto, Santa Rita, Santa Isabel districts).
