= National Route 750 (Costa Rica) =

National Road Route in Costa Rica

National Tertiary Route 750
- Ruta nacional terciaria 750

Route information
- Maintained by Ministry of Public Works and Transport
- Length: 8.450 km (5.251 mi)

Location
- Country: Costa Rica
- Provinces: Alajuela

Highway system
- National Road Network of Costa Rica
← Route 749	→ Route 751

National Tertiary Route 750, or just Route 750 (Spanish: Ruta Nacional Terciaria 750, or Ruta 750) is a National Road Route of Costa Rica, located in the Alajuela province.

== Description ==
In Alajuela province the route covers San Carlos canton (Aguas Zarcas district).
