= National Route 738 (Costa Rica) =

National Road Route in Costa Rica

National Tertiary Route 738
- Ruta nacional terciaria 738

Route information
- Maintained by Ministry of Public Works and Transport
- Length: 5.600 km (3.480 mi)

Location
- Country: Costa Rica
- Provinces: Alajuela

Highway system
- National Road Network of Costa Rica
← Route 737	→ Route 739

National Tertiary Route 738, or just Route 738 (Spanish: Ruta Nacional Terciaria 738, or Ruta 738) is a National Road Route of Costa Rica, located in the Alajuela province.

== Description ==
In Alajuela province the route covers San Carlos canton (La Tigra district).
