= Zapote District, Zarcero =

District in Zarcero canton, Alajuela province, Costa Rica

Zapote
- District
- Zapote district
- Zapote district location in Costa Rica
- Coordinates: 10.2428114°N 84.4584816°W
- Country: Costa Rica
- Province: Alajuela
- Canton: Zarcero
- Creation: 22 July 1939

Area
  - Total: 44.77 km^{2} (17.29 sq mi)
- Elevation: 1,580 m (5,180 ft)

Population (2011)
  - Total: 739
  - Density: 16.5/km^{2} (42.8/sq mi)
- Time zone: UTC−06:00
- Postal code: 21106

Zapote is a district of the Zarcero canton, in the Alajuela province of Costa Rica.

== History ==
Zapote was created on 22 July 1939 by Decreto Ejecutivo 35. Segregated from San Carlos canton.

== Geography ==
Zapote has an area of 44.77 km^{2} and an elevation of 1,580 metres.

== Locations ==
- Poblados (villages): Quina (part), San Juan de Lajas, Santa Elena

== Demographics ==
Historical population
Census	Pop.	±% p.a.
1883	284	—
1950	976	+1.86%
1963	838	−1.17%
1973	731	−1.36%
1984	635	−1.27%
2000	723	+0.81%
2011	739	+0.20%
2022	1,022	+2.99%
Source: Instituto Nacional de Estadística y Censos; Centro Centroamericano de Población

For the 2011 census, Zapote had a population of 739 inhabitants.

== Transportation ==
=== Road transportation ===
The district is covered by the following road routes:

- National Route 141
