= National Route 745 (Costa Rica) =

National Road Route in Costa Rica

National Tertiary Route 745
- Ruta nacional terciaria 745

Route information
- Maintained by Ministry of Public Works and Transport
- Length: 49.075 km (30.494 mi)

Location
- Country: Costa Rica
- Provinces: Alajuela, Heredia

Highway system
- National Road Network of Costa Rica
← Route 744	→ Route 746

National Tertiary Route 745, or just Route 745 (Spanish: Ruta Nacional Terciaria 745, or Ruta 745) is a National Road Route of Costa Rica, located in the Alajuela, Heredia provinces.

== Description ==
In Alajuela province the route covers San Carlos canton (Pital district), Río Cuarto canton (Santa Rita, Santa Isabel districts).

In Heredia province the route covers Sarapiquí canton (La Virgen, Cureña districts).
