= Palmira District, Zarcero =

District in Zarcero canton, Alajuela province, Costa Rica

Palmira
- District
- Palmira district
- Palmira district location in Costa Rica
- Coordinates: 10.2069229°N 84.3500019°W
- Country: Costa Rica
- Province: Alajuela
- Canton: Zarcero

Area
  - Total: 30.44 km^{2} (11.75 sq mi)
- Elevation: 2,010 m (6,590 ft)

Population (2011)
  - Total: 1,334
  - Density: 43.82/km^{2} (113.5/sq mi)
- Time zone: UTC−06:00
- Postal code: 21105

Palmira is a district of the Zarcero canton, in the Alajuela province of Costa Rica.

== Geography ==
Palmira has an area of 30.44 km^{2} and an elevation of 2,010 metres.

== Locations ==
- Poblados (villages): Picada

== Demographics ==
Historical population
Census	Pop.	±% p.a.
1927	337	—
1950	370	+0.41%
1963	455	+1.60%
1973	580	+2.46%
1984	767	+2.57%
2000	1,308	+3.39%
2011	1,334	+0.18%
2022	1,584	+1.57%
Source: Instituto Nacional de Estadística y Censos; Centro Centroamericano de Población

For the 2011 census, Palmira had a population of 1,334 inhabitants.

== Transportation ==
=== Road transportation ===
The district is covered by the following road routes:

- National Route 741
