= National Route 752 (Costa Rica) =

National Road Route in Costa Rica

National Tertiary Route 752
- Ruta nacional terciaria 752

Route information
- Maintained by Ministry of Public Works and Transport
- Length: 20.985 km (13.039 mi)

Location
- Country: Costa Rica
- Provinces: Alajuela

Highway system
- National Road Network of Costa Rica
← Route 751	→ Route 753

National Tertiary Route 752, or just Route 752 (Spanish: Ruta Nacional Terciaria 752, or Ruta 752) is a National Road Route of Costa Rica, located in the Alajuela province.

== Description ==
In Alajuela province the route covers San Carlos canton (Monterrey and Pocosol districts).
