= National Route 739 (Costa Rica) =

National Road Route in Costa Rica

National Tertiary Route 739
- Ruta nacional terciaria 739

Route information
- Maintained by Ministry of Public Works and Transport
- Length: 10.400 km (6.462 mi)

Location
- Country: Costa Rica
- Provinces: Alajuela

Highway system
- National Road Network of Costa Rica
← Route 738	→ Route 741

National Tertiary Route 739, or just Route 739 (Spanish: Ruta Nacional Terciaria 739, or Ruta 739) is a National Road Route of Costa Rica, located in the Alajuela province.

== Description ==
In Alajuela province the route covers San Ramón canton (San Lorenzo district), San Carlos canton (Florencia district).
