= Buenavista, San Carlos =

District in San Carlos canton, Alajuela province, Costa Rica

Buenavista
- District
- Interactive map of Buenavista
- Buenavista district location in Costa Rica
- Coordinates: 10.2817426°N 84.4756115°W
- Country: Costa Rica
- Province: Alajuela
- Canton: San Carlos

Area
  - Total: 25.98 km^{2} (10.03 sq mi)
- Elevation: 865 m (2,838 ft)

Population (2011)
  - Total: 325
  - Density: 12.5/km^{2} (32.4/sq mi)
- Time zone: UTC−06:00
- Postal code: 21003

Buenavista is a district of the San Carlos canton, in the Alajuela province of Costa Rica.

== Geography ==
Buenavista has an area of 25.98 km^{2} which makes it the smallest district in the canton by area, and an elevation of 865 metres with a range between 500 and 900 meters above sea level.

It is located in the northern region of the country and borders with 2 districts; Florencia to the N / NO, Quesada to the N / NE. While to the south it borders with the canton of Zarcero.

Its head, the town of Buenavista, is located 13.3 km (35 minutes) to the NW of Ciudad Quesada and 94.9 km (2 hours 37 minutes) to the NW of San Jose, the nation's capital.

The grounds of Buenavista are distinguished by being very broken, with a type of steep soil and steep slopes.

== Economy ==
This is a special place for dairy farming.

It also has a health post and a school and only a grocery store.

It has very little infrastructure, the majority are houses of room.

Through the installation of a hydroelectric project, the community managed to increase its economic and communal development.

Thanks to the construction of the new San Carlos-San Ramón highway, Buena Vista will become a more crowded region.

== Demographics ==
Historical population
Census	Pop.	±% p.a.
1927	641	—
1950	725	+0.54%
1963	351	−5.43%
1973	255	−3.14%
1984	289	+1.14%
2000	352	+1.24%
2011	325	−0.72%
2022	517	+4.31%
Source: Instituto Nacional de Estadística y Censos; Centro Centroamericano de Población

For the 2011 census, Buenavista had a population of 325 inhabitants. Buenavista is one of the districts with the lowest number of inhabitants of the country, it has about 325 inhabitants.

== Transportation ==
=== Road transportation ===
The district is covered by the following road routes:

- National Route 141
