= Congo Volcano =

Inactive volcano in Costa Rica

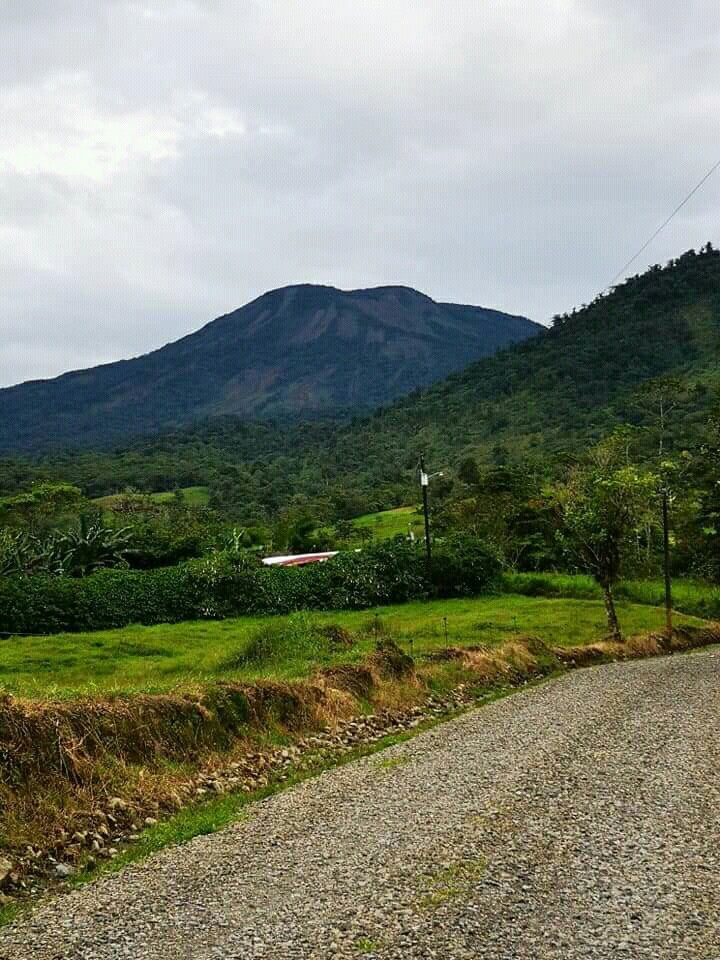

Highest point
- Elevation: 2,014 m (6,608 ft)
- Listing: List of volcanoes in Costa Rica
- Coordinates: 10°15′00″N 84°14′00″W

Geography
- Location within Costa Rica
- Location: Costa Rica
- Parent range: Cordillera Central

Geology
- Mountain type: Stratovolcano
- Volcanic arc: Central America Volcanic Arc
- Last eruption: ~11,000 years ago

The Congo Volcano, in Spanish the Volcán Congo and also known as Congo Mountain, Cerro Congo, is an inactive volcano in Costa Rica, situated in the Cordillera Central range near the Poás Volcano and within the Poás Volcano National Park. It is often confused with Platanar Volcano, which often receives the alternative and incorrect name of Cerro Congo.

== Toponymy ==
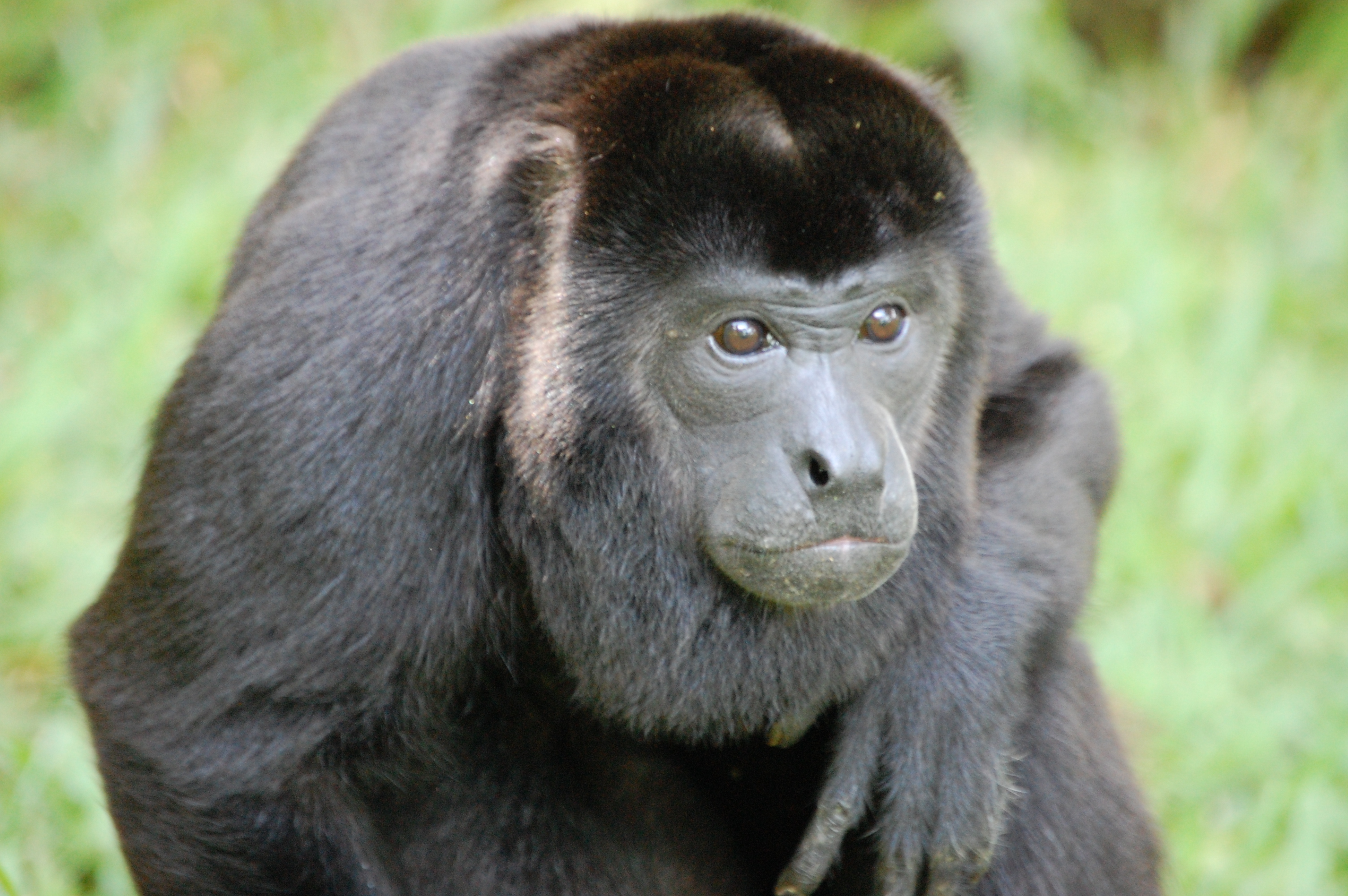
Sitting Alouatta palliata, or Congo monkey, Costa Rica

The name comes from the mantled howler monkey, locally known as Congo monkey, as it is common to find it in the region and its howling can be heard at great distances. The name was in use by the 19th century.

== Physical aspects ==
The Congo volcano is a stratovolcano, with an area of 25 km2, 6 km north of Poás Volcano. The crater is open on its north side, and it is very eroded due to rain, which in turn provides the source for María Aguilar river and its valley.
