= Santa Isabel District, Río Cuarto =

District in Río Cuarto canton, Alajuela province, Costa Rica

Santa Isabel
- District
- Santa Isabel district
- Santa Isabel district location in Costa Rica
- Coordinates: 10.5035442°N 84.2078502°W
- Country: Costa Rica
- Province: Alajuela
- Canton: Río Cuarto
- Creation: 11 October 2018
- Elevation: 165 m (541 ft)
- Time zone: UTC−06:00
- Postal code: 21603

Santa Isabel is a district of the Río Cuarto canton, in the Alajuela province of Costa Rica.

== History ==
Santa Isabel was created on 11 October 2018 by Acuerdo Ejecutivo N°044-2018-MGP.

== Geography ==
Santa Isabel has an area of km^{2} and an elevation of 165 metres.

== Settlements ==
The eponymous Santa Isabel village is its head village, and it also encompasses the villages of Los Lagos, Merced, Pinar, San Fernando, San José, San Rafael and San Vicente.

== Demographics ==
Historical population
Census	Pop.	±% p.a.
2022	4,066	—
Source: Instituto Nacional de Estadística y Censos; Centro Centroamericano de Población

For the 2011 census, Santa Isabel had not been created, its inhabitants were part of Río Cuarto canton when it was a district of Grecia canton.

== Transportation ==
=== Road transportation ===
The district is covered by the following road routes:

- National Route 744
- National Route 745
