= Monterrey, San Carlos =

District in San Carlos canton, Alajuela province, Costa Rica

Monterrey
- District
- Monterrey district
- Monterrey district location in Costa Rica
- Coordinates: 10.5762433°N 84.6239045°W
- Country: Costa Rica
- Province: Alajuela
- Canton: San Carlos
- Creation: 16 April 1979

Area
  - Total: 220.2 km^{2} (85.0 sq mi)
- Elevation: 280 m (920 ft)

Population (2011)
  - Total: 3,455
  - Density: 15.69/km^{2} (40.64/sq mi)
- Time zone: UTC−06:00
- Postal code: 21012

Monterrey is a district of the San Carlos canton, in the Alajuela province of Costa Rica.

== History ==
Monterrey was created on 16 April 1979 by Decreto Ejecutivo 10003-G. Segregated from Venado.

== Geography ==
Monterrey has an area of 220.2 km^{2} and a mean elevation of 280 (100-1200 range) metres.

== Location ==
It is located in the northern region of the country and borders with Pocosol to the north, La Fortuna and Tilarán to the south, La Fortuna and Cutris to the east and Venado to the west.

Its head, the town of Monterrey, is located 50.6 km (1 hour 2 minutes) to the NW of Ciudad Quesada and 142 km (2 hours 47 minutes) to the NW of San Jose the capital of the nation.

== Demographics ==
Historical population
Census	Pop.	±% p.a.
1984	2,650	—
2000	3,124	+1.03%
2011	3,455	+0.92%
2022	3,860	+1.01%
Source: Instituto Nacional de Estadística y Censos; Centro Centroamericano de Población

For the 2011 census, Monterrey had a population of 3,455 inhabitants.

== Transportation ==
=== Road transportation ===
The district is covered by the following road routes:

- National Route 4
- National Route 752

== Settlements ==
Monterrey has 17 population centers:

- Santo Domingo
- Mirador
- Santa Marta
- Montelimar
- San Andrés
- San Cristóbal
- La Unión
- San Antonio
- Pataste
- Sabalito
- San Miguel
- San Juan
- Las Delicias
- Chambacú
- La Orquídea
- Alto de Monterrey
- San Eulalia

== Economy ==
The district is characterized by a fresh climate, mountains and evergreen grasslands that together with the wealth and abundance of water, allows the development of meat and milk breeding, as well as planting roots and tubers.
