= Santa Rita District, Río Cuarto =

District in Río Cuarto canton, Alajuela province, Costa Rica

Santa Rita
- District
- Santa Rita district
- Santa Rita district location in Costa Rica
- Coordinates: 10.4040905°N 84.2109776°W
- Country: Costa Rica
- Province: Alajuela
- Canton: Río Cuarto
- Creation: 11 October 2018
- Elevation: 236 m (774 ft)
- Time zone: UTC−06:00
- Postal code: 21602

Santa Rita is a district of the Río Cuarto canton, in the Alajuela province of Costa Rica.

== History ==
Santa Rita was created on 11 October 2018 by Acuerdo Ejecutivo N°044-2018-MGP.

== Geography ==
Santa Rita has an area of km^{2} and an elevation of 236 metres.

== Settlements ==
The eponymous Santa Rita village is its head village, and it also encompasses the villages of Ángeles Norte, Flor, La Trinidad, Montelirio, Naranjales, Peoresnada, San Gerardo (partially) and Tabla.

== Demographics ==
Historical population
Census	Pop.	±% p.a.
2022	5,790	—
Source: Instituto Nacional de Estadística y Censos; Centro Centroamericano de Población

For the 2011 census, Santa Rita had not been created, its inhabitants were part of Río Cuarto canton when it was a district of Grecia canton.

== Transportation ==
=== Road transportation ===
The district is covered by the following road routes:

- National Route 4
- National Route 744
- National Route 745
