= Pocosol =

District in San Carlos canton, Alajuela province, Costa Rica

- District
- Pocosol district
- Pocosol district location in Costa Rica
- Coordinates: 10.7510634°N 84.4556481°W
- Country: Costa Rica
- Province: Alajuela
- Canton: San Carlos
- Creation: 3 November 1983

Area
  - Total: 660.75 km^{2} (255.12 sq mi)
- Elevation: 110 m (360 ft)

Population (2011)
  - Total: 15,395
  - Density: 23.299/km^{2} (60.345/sq mi)
- Time zone: UTC−06:00
- Postal code: 21013

Pocosol is a district of the San Carlos canton, in the Alajuela province of Costa Rica.

== History ==
Pocosol was created on 3 November 1983 by Acuerdo Ejecutivo 231. Segregated from Cutris.

== Geography ==
Pocosol has an area of 660.75 km^{2} and an elevation of 110 metres.

It is located in the northern region of the country and its limits are, to the north Nicaragua, to the south Monterrey, to the west Los Chiles, to the east Cutris.

Its head, the town of Santa Rosa, is located 44.7 km (1 hour) NE of Ciudad Quesada and 144 km (2 hours 51 minutes) to the NW of San Jose the capital of the nation.

It presents a level ground in almost all its extension.

== Demographics ==
Historical population
Census	Pop.	±% p.a.
1984	8,105	—
2000	12,177	+2.58%
2011	15,395	+2.15%
2022	18,913	+1.89%
Source: Instituto Nacional de Estadística y Censos; Centro Centroamericano de Población

For the 2011 census, Pocosol had a population of 15,395 inhabitants. It is the fourth most populated of the canton, behind of The district counts on 15 395 inhabitants, turning it into the fourth most populated of the canton, behind of de Quesada, Aguas Zarcas y Pital.

== Transportation ==
=== Road transportation ===
The district is covered by the following road routes:

- National Route 35
- National Route 227
- National Route 752
- National Route 761

== Settlements ==
Pocosol has 44 population centers:

- Santa Rosa (head of the district)
- Santa María
- Las Brisas
- Acapulco
- Tres y Tres
- Asentamiento Juanilama
- La Esperanza
- San Martín
- San Bosco
- Santa Lucía
- San Diego
- San Andrés
- San Isidro (Zapatón)
- Buenos Aires
- Esterito
- La Milagrosa
- Asentamiento Los Ángeles
- Asentamiento Las Nieves
- Asentamiento Santa Rosa
- Parajeles
- San Gerardo
- Santa Cecilia
- El Edén
- La Luisa
- San Luis
- El Plomo
- Rancho Quemado
- Paraíso
- Pueblo Nuevo
- Paso Real
- San Rafael
- La Ceiba
- La Aldea
- San Alejo
- San Cristóbal
- Cuatro Esquinas
- Banderas
- El Conchito
- San Isidro
- La Guaria
- El Jocote
- Llano Verde
- La Azucena
- El Concho
- Pueblo Santo

== Economy ==
There are three main economic activities:

- Cultivation of agricultural products like citrus, sugar cane, roots and tubers.
- Dual purpose cattle activity (meat and milk).
- Reforestation and industrialization of wood.

=== Services ===
Pocosol has health and educational services. In addition to a lot of commerce such as pharmacies, shops, financial institutions, restaurants, among others.
