= National Route 250 (Costa Rica) =

National Road Route in Costa Rica

National Secondary Route 250
- Ruta nacional secundaria 250

Route information
- Maintained by Ministry of Public Works and Transport
- Length: 62.475 km (38.820 mi)

Location
- Country: Costa Rica
- Provinces: Alajuela

Highway system
- National Road Network of Costa Rica
← Route 249	→ Route 251

National Secondary Route 250, or just Route 250 (Spanish: Ruta Nacional Secundaria 250, or Ruta 250) is a National Road Route of Costa Rica, located in the Alajuela province.

== Description ==
In Alajuela province the route covers San Carlos canton (Aguas Zarcas and Pital districts).
