= La Palmera, San Carlos =

District in San Carlos canton, Alajuela province, Costa Rica

La Palmera
- District
- Interactive map of La Palmera
- La Palmera district location in Costa Rica
- Coordinates: 10.3652639°N 84.3983932°W
- Country: Costa Rica
- Province: Alajuela
- Canton: San Carlos
- Creation: 5 February 1952

Area
  - Total: 100.45 km^{2} (38.78 sq mi)
- Elevation: 350 m (1,150 ft)

Population (2011)
  - Total: 6,321
  - Density: 62.93/km^{2} (163.0/sq mi)
- Time zone: UTC−06:00
- Postal code: 21009

La Palmera is a district of the San Carlos canton, in the Alajuela province of Costa Rica.

== History ==
La Palmera was created on 5 February 1952 by Decreto Ejecutivo 15.

== Geography ==
La Palmera has an area of 100.45 km^{2} which makes it the eleventh district of the canton by area and a mean elevation of 350 metres.

It is located at an elevation range between 100 and 2200 meters above sea level.

It is located in the northern region of the country and borders four districts; Cutris to the north, Aguas Zarcas to the East, Florencia and y Quesada to the west. While to the south it borders with the canton of Sarchí.

Its head, the town of La Palmera, is located 19.4 km (54 minutes) NE of Ciudad Quesada and 106 km (3 hours 4 minutes) to the NW of San Jose the capital of the nation.

== Demographics ==
Historical population
Census	Pop.	±% p.a.
1963	1,918	—
1973	2,432	+2.40%
1984	2,844	+1.43%
2000	4,608	+3.06%
2011	6,321	+2.92%
2022	11,929	+5.94%
Source: Instituto Nacional de Estadística y Censos; Centro Centroamericano de Población

For the 2011 census, La Palmera had a population of 6,321 inhabitants. It is the tenth more populated district of the canton, behind of Quesada, Aguas Zarcas, Pital, La Fortuna, Florencia, Pocosol and Cutris.

== Transportation ==
=== Road transportation ===
The district is covered by the following road routes:

- National Route 4
- National Route 140
- National Route 747
- National Route 748

== Settlements ==
La Palmera has 6 population centers:

- La Palmera (head of the district)
- La Marina
- Santa Rosa
- Concepción
- San Francisco
- La Unión

== Economy ==
The main activity of this place is livestock, and in less proportion the cultivation of citrus, sugar cane, roots and tubers. There is also the exploitation of calcium carbonate.

Tourist services are also offered in the facilities of La Marina and the thermal waters (shares sources with Aguas Zarcas) where you can appreciate the nature that characterizes the place.

La Palmera urban area, has health services, educational, restaurants and grocery stores.
