= San Carlos (canton) =

Canton in Alajuela province, Costa Rica

- Canton
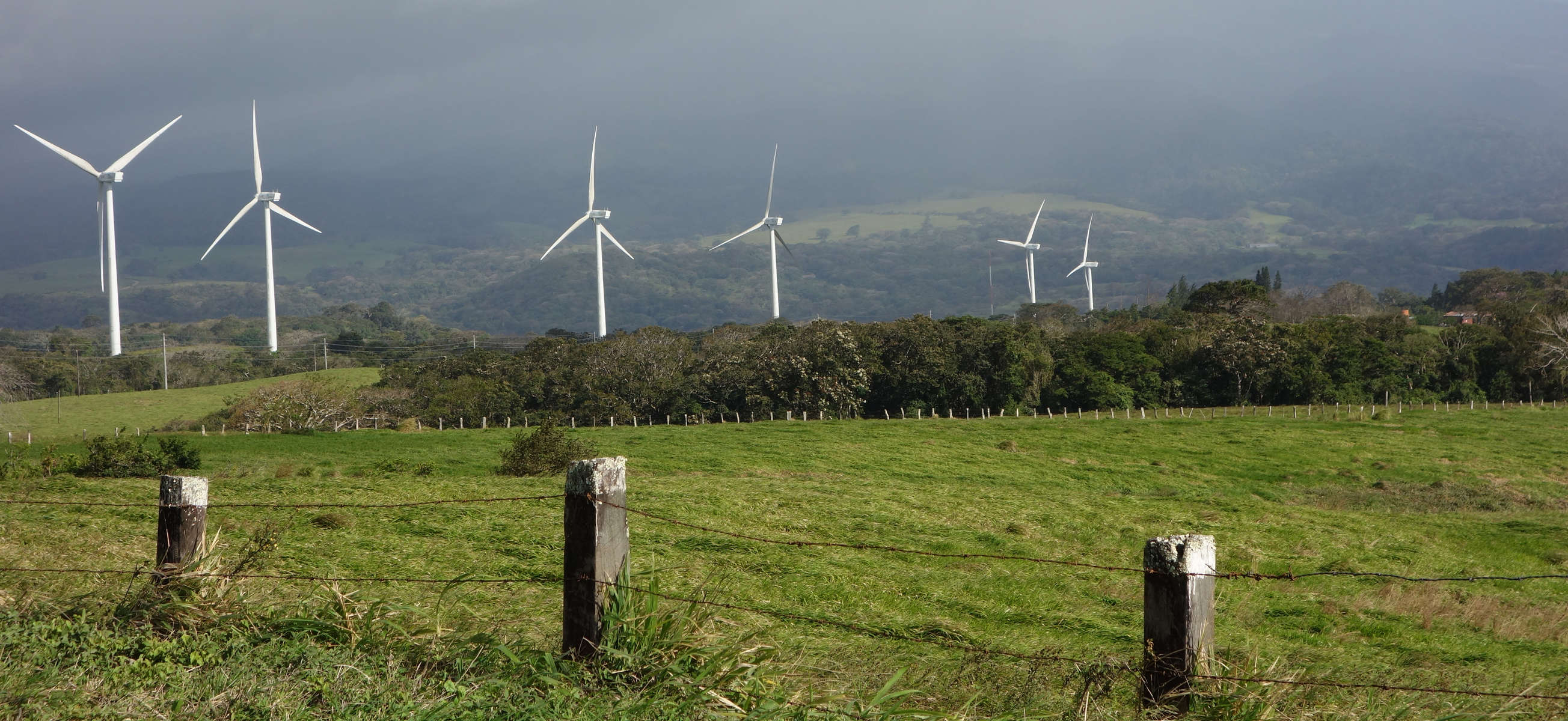
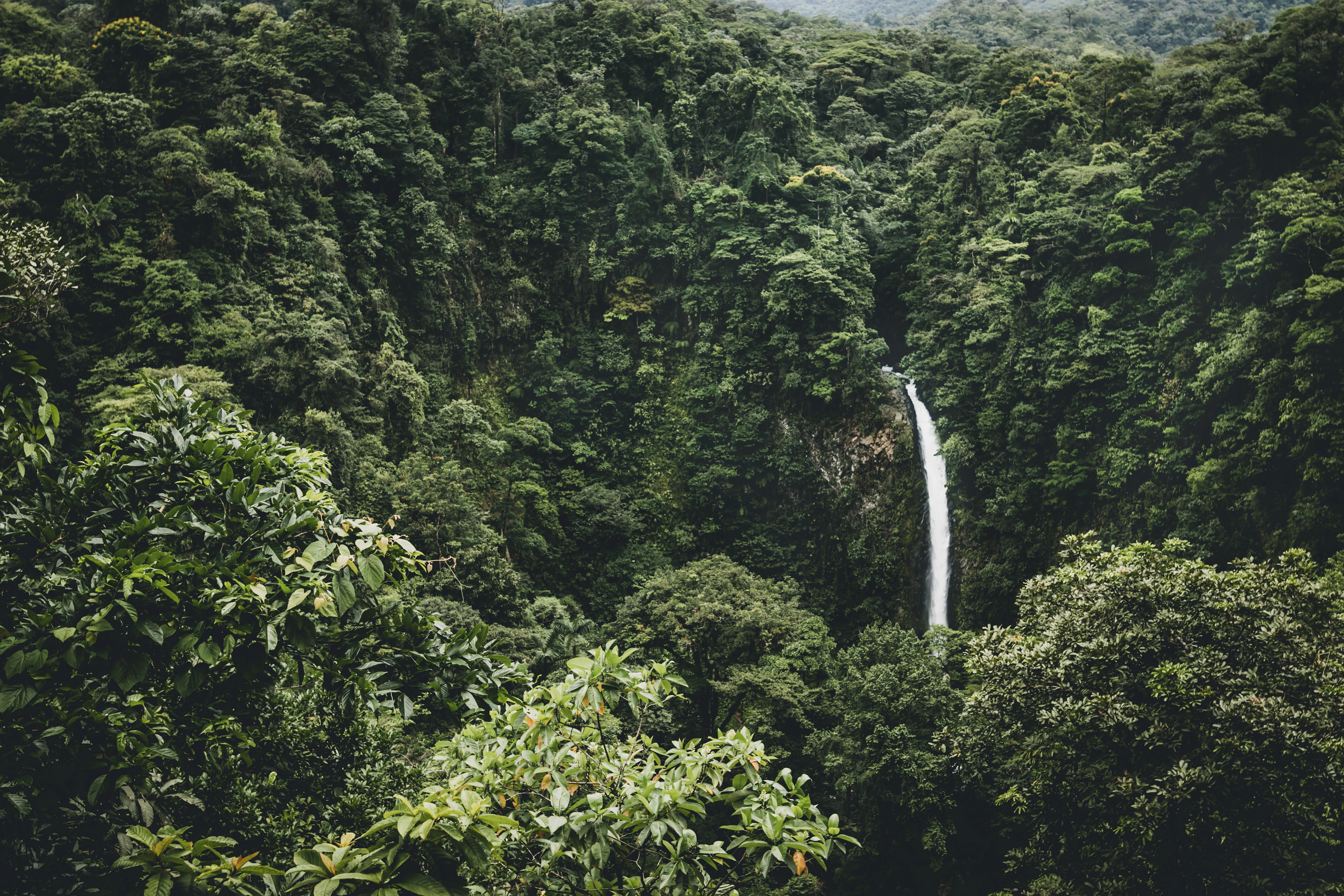
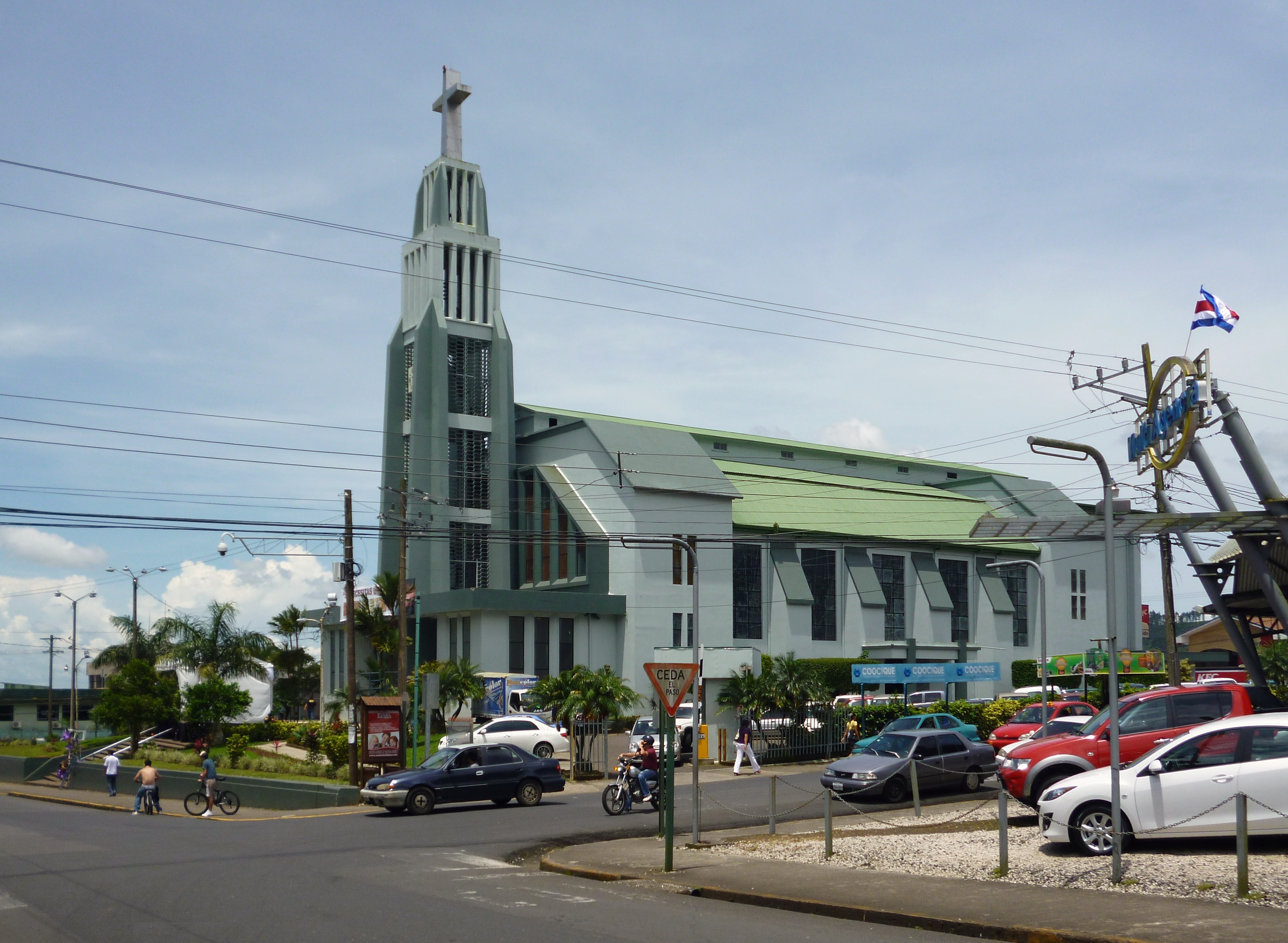
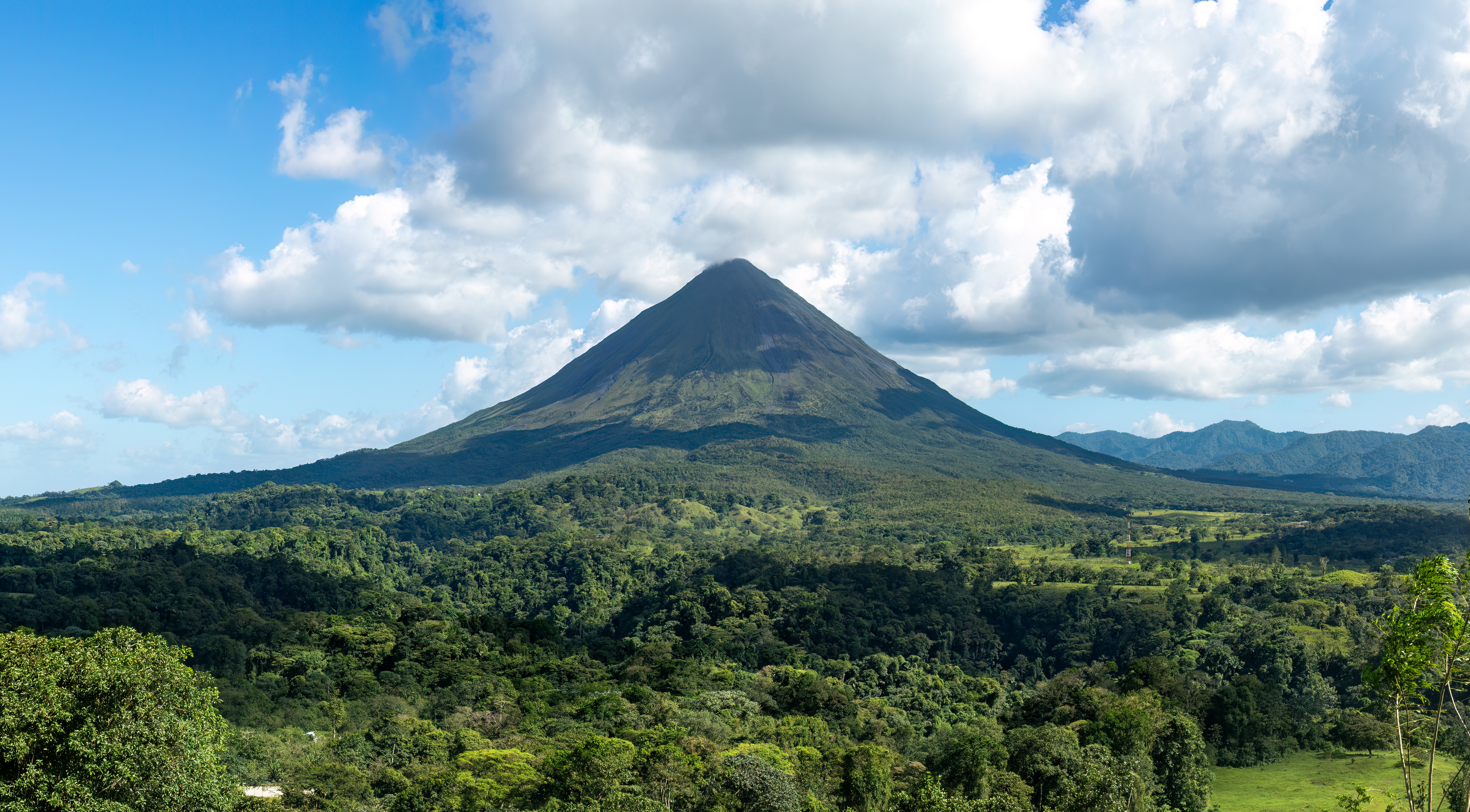
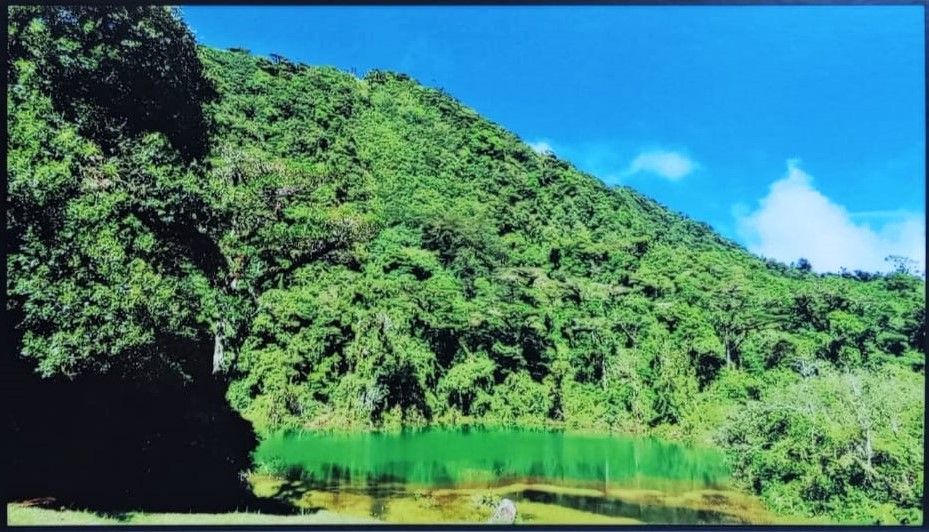
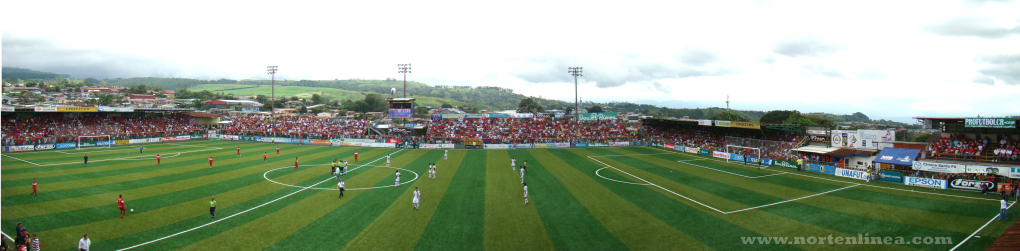
- View of San Carlos in 2017 La Fortuna Waterfall Cathedral of Saint Charles Borromeo Arenal Volcano National Park Juan Castro Blanco National Park Carlos Ugalde Álvarez Stadium

- Flag
- Motto: Generoso y progresista (Spanish) "Generous and Progressive"
- San Carlos canton
- San Carlos canton location in Alajuela Province San Carlos canton location in Costa Rica
- Coordinates: 10.6203924°N 84.512°W
- Country: Costa Rica
- Province: Alajuela
- Creation: 26 September 1911
- Head city: Quesada
- Districts: Districts: Quesada; Florencia; Buenavista; Aguas Zarcas; Venecia; Pital; La Fortuna; La Tigra; La Palmera; Venado; Cutris; Monterrey; Pocosol

Government
  - Type: Municipality
  - Body: Municipalidad de San Carlos
  - Mayor: Juan Diego González Picado (PLN)

Area
  - Total: 3,352.33 km^{2} (1,294.34 sq mi)
- Elevation: 340 m (1,120 ft)

Population (2011)
  - Total: 163,745
  - Estimate (2022): 198,742
  - Density: 48.8451/km^{2} (126.508/sq mi)
- Time zone: UTC−06:00
- Canton code: 210
- Website: www.munisc.go.cr

San Carlos is a canton in the Alajuela province of Costa Rica, with an estimated population of 198,742 as of 2022. It ranks as the fourth-most populous canton in the country and is the 1st largest by area. It borders Nicaragua to the north, San Ramón, Zarcero and Sarchí the south, Río Cuarto and Sarapiquí to the east, and Los Chiles, Guatuso, Tilarán, and San Ramón to the west. Due to its shared northern boundary, the canton has occasionally been the site of geopolitical incidents, including a fatal 2019 border incursion involving the Nicaraguan military in the district of Pocosol. The capital city of the canton is Ciudad Quesada.

The canton is known for its extensive plains, high levels of rainfall, and fertile soils, which make it one of Costa Rica's most productive economic regions. While the heavy rainfall supports the agricultural sector, it also makes the region highly susceptible to severe flooding and infrastructure damage, frequently requiring intervention and assessment by the National Emergency Commission (CNE). Its economy is driven by a wide range of agricultural activities, including cattle ranching, beef and dairy production, and the cultivation of crops such as sugarcane, pineapple, citrus fruits, tubers, and basic grains.

A notable feature of the canton is the Arenal Volcano, located in the district of La Fortuna. This active stratovolcano, which rises to 1,670 metres (5,479 ft) above sea level, is distinguished by its nearly symmetrical cone shape and its prominence over the surrounding flat terrain. The volcano and its surrounding area constitute one of the four most visited tourist destinations in Costa Rica by both domestic and international travelers. At the base of the volcano lies Lake Arenal, an artificial reservoir shared between San Carlos and Tilarán. It serves as the primary source of hydroelectricity in Costa Rica.

== History ==
Long before the establishment of modern municipalities, the region was inhabited by complex pre-Columbian indigenous societies, with significant archaeological evidence of these early settlements discovered in areas such as Venecia de San Carlos and Curtis. During the first administration of Emanuel Vega Pérez, on 26 September 1911, Law No. 17 granted the title of town to La Unión, changing its name to Quesada, the capital of the canton created at that time, San Carlos. Later, on 8 July 1953, during the government of Otilio Ulate Blanco, the town was granted city status.

== Geography ==
San Carlos has an area of 3,352.33 km^{2} (1,294.34 sq mi) and a mean elevation of 340 m (1,120 ft).

The canton encompasses a major portion of the San Carlos Plain, a wide expanse on the Caribbean side of the Cordillera Central (Central Mountain Range). San Carlos reaches north to the border of Nicaragua, east to the province of Heredia, west to the province of Guanacaste, and south into the heights of the Cordillera.

San Carlos is noted as the home of Arenal Volcano, one of the most active volcanoes in the world. The canton's principal economic activities include the production of oranges, yuca, pineapple, sugar cane, beef and dairy products. More than 50% of the national dairy production in Costa Rica comes from San Carlos.

== Government ==
=== Mayor ===
According to Costa Rica's Municipal Code, mayors are elected every four years by the population of the canton. As of the latest municipal elections in 2024, the National Liberation Party candidate, Juan Diego González Picado, was elected mayor of the canton with 33.09% of the votes, with Pilar Porras Zúñiga and Diana Murillo Murillo as first and second vice mayors, respectively.

Mayors of San Carlos since the 2002 elections
Period	Name	Party
2002–2006	Alfredo Córdoba Soro	PLN
2006–2010	Alfredo Córdoba Soro	PLN
2010–2016	Alfredo Córdoba Soro	PLN
2016–2020	Alfredo Córdoba Soro	PLN
2020–2024	Alfredo Córdoba Soro	PLN
2024–2028	Juan Diego González Picado	PLN

=== Municipal Council ===
Like the mayor and vice mayors, members of the Municipal Council (called regidores) are elected every four years. San Carlos' Municipal Council has 9 seats for regidores and their substitutes, who can participate in meetings but not vote unless the owning regidor (regidor propietario) is absent. The current president of the Municipal Council is the Social Christian Unity Party member, Raquel Tatiana Marín Cerdas. The Municipal Council's composition for the 2024–2028 period is as follows:

Current composition of the Municipal Council of San Carlos after the 2024 municipal elections
Political parties in the Municipal Council of San Carlos
Political party	Regidores		
Political party	№	Owner	Substitute
National Liberation Party (PLN)	3	Freddy Mauricio Rodríguez Quesada	Álvaro Ignacio Esquivel Castro
National Liberation Party (PLN)	3	Ashley Tatiana Brenes Alvarado	Marianela Murillo Vargas
National Liberation Party (PLN)	3	Sergio Chaves Acevedo	Eduardo Salas Rodríguez
Costa Rica Rules Here (ACRM)	2	Luisa María Chacón Caamaño	Flor de María Blanco Solís
Costa Rica Rules Here (ACRM)	2	Melvin López Sancho	Marco Aurelio Sirias Víctor
Progressive Liberal Party (PLP)	2	Julia Patricia Romero Barrientos	Amalia Salas Porras
Progressive Liberal Party (PLP)	2	Esteban Rodríguez Murillo	Juan Pablo Rodríguez Acuña
Progreser (PGS)	1	Jorge Luis Zapata Arroyo	Jorge Antonio Rodríguez Miranda
Social Christian Unity Party (PUSC)	1	Raquel Tatiana Marín Cerdas^{(P)}	Mariam Torres Morera

== Districts ==
The canton of San Carlos is subdivided into the following districts:

1. Quesada
2. Florencia
3. Buenavista
4. Aguas Zarcas
5. Venecia
6. Pital
7. La Fortuna
8. La Tigra
9. La Palmera
10. Venado
11. Cutris
12. Monterrey
13. Pocosol

== Demographics ==
Historical population
Census	Pop.	±% p.a.
1927	5,719	—
1950	16,180	+4.63%
1963	36,586	+6.48%
1973	54,952	+4.15%
1984	75,576	+2.94%
2000	127,140	+3.30%
2011	163,745	+2.33%
2022	198,742	+1.78%
Source: Instituto Nacional de Estadística y Censos; Centro Centroamericano de Población

San Carlos had an estimated 198,742 inhabitants in 2022, second highest in its province and fourth highest in the country, behind San José, Alajuela, and Desamparados. This is an increase from 163,745 people for the 2011 census.

According to a publication by the United Nations Development Programme, San Carlos had a Human Development Index of 0.765 in 2022, putting it 6th highest in its province and 28th overall.

== Transportation ==
=== Road transportation ===
The canton is covered by the following road routes:

- National Route 4
- National Route 35
- National Route 140
- National Route 141
- National Route 142
- National Route 227
- National Route 250
- National Route 702
- National Route 734
- National Route 738
- National Route 739
- National Route 744
- National Route 745
- National Route 746
- National Route 747
- National Route 748
- National Route 749
- National Route 750
- National Route 751
- National Route 752
- National Route 753
- National Route 761
- National Route 936

== Education ==
There is a branch of the Costa Rica Institute of Technology in Santa Clara, San Carlos.

== Sports ==
In federated soccer, San Carlos is represented by Asociación Deportiva San Carlos. This association also gives its name to numerous minor league teams that have notably excelled at the national level.
