= La Tigra, San Carlos =

District in San Carlos canton, Alajuela province, Costa Rica

La Tigra
- District
- Interactive map of La Tigra
- La Tigra district location in Costa Rica
- Coordinates: 10.3555188°N 84.5848505°W
- Country: Costa Rica
- Province: Alajuela
- Canton: San Carlos
- Creation: 5 February 1952

Area
  - Total: 56.44 km^{2} (21.79 sq mi)
- Elevation: 290 m (950 ft)

Population (2011)
  - Total: 6,374
  - Density: 112.9/km^{2} (292.5/sq mi)
- Time zone: UTC−06:00
- Postal code: 21008

La Tigra is a district of the San Carlos canton, in the Alajuela province of Costa Rica.

== History ==
La Tigra was created on 5 February 1952 by Decreto Ejecutivo 15.

== Geography ==
La Tigra has an area of 56.44 km^{2} and an elevation of 290 metres.

It is located in the northern region of the country and limits to the north with Florencia, to the south with San Ramón, to the east with Florencia and San Ramón.

Its head, the village of La Tigra, is located 27.9 km (48 minutes) to the east of Ciudad Quesada and 108 km (2 hours 36 minutes) to the northwest of San José the capital of the nation.

It is located at an elevation range of between 200 and 1100 meters above sea level.

== Demographics ==
Historical population
Census	Pop.	±% p.a.
1963	1,653	—
1973	1,741	+0.52%
1984	2,644	+3.87%
2000	5,368	+4.53%
2011	6,374	+1.57%
2022	8,984	+3.17%
Source: Instituto Nacional de Estadística y Censos; Centro Centroamericano de Población

For the 2011 census, La Tigra had a population of 6,374 inhabitants. It is the ninth most populated district of the canton.

== Settlements ==
La Tigra has 10 population centers:

- La Tigra (head of the district)
- Concepción
- El Futuro
- San José
- San Pedro
- San Isidro
- San Miguel
- San Rafael
- La Lucha
- San Gerardo

== Economy ==
The production of ornamental plants became, over the years, one of the main productive activities of this district, where the climate and the land lend themselves to the cultivation of large variety of species of export like dracaenas, Indian cane, orchids, deremensis, between others.

In addition to the plants, crops such as cassava, the ñampí, the tiquizque and the banana are planted, among others.

In turn, the arrival of tourism is glimpsed with the Bosque Eterno de Los Niños, which owns a rainforest with a great diversity of plants and animals that give life to the place.

== Transportation ==
=== Road transportation ===
The district is covered by the following road routes:

- National Route 141
- National Route 702
- National Route 738
