= Pital, San Carlos =

District in San Carlos canton, Alajuela province, Costa Rica

Pital
- District
- Pital district
- Pital district location in Costa Rica
- Coordinates: 10.6024418°N 84.2473646°W
- Country: Costa Rica
- Province: Alajuela
- Canton: San Carlos
- Creation: 5 November 1948

Area
  - Total: 379.61 km^{2} (146.57 sq mi)
- Elevation: 156 m (512 ft)

Population (2011)
  - Total: 17,318
  - Density: 45.621/km^{2} (118.16/sq mi)
- Time zone: UTC−06:00
- Postal code: 21006

Pital is a district of the San Carlos canton, in the Alajuela province of Costa Rica.

== History ==
Pital was created by Decreto 36 on 5 November, 1948.

== Geography ==
Pital has an area of 379.61 km^{2}, making it the third district of the canton by area and an elevation of 156 metres.

It is located in the northern region of the country and borders with 3 districts; Venice to the south, Cutris and Aguas Zarcas to the west. While to the north it borders with Nicaragua and to the east with the province of Heredia.

Its head, the city of Pital, is located 28.6 km (50 minutes) NE of Quesada (Costa Rica) and 91.9 km (2 hours 30 minutes) to NW of San José the capital of the nation.

It is located at an elevation of 100 meters above sea level.

It is located at low altitude because much of the district is located in the plains of San Carlos.

== Demographics ==
Historical population
Census	Pop.	±% p.a.
1950	1,435	—
1963	3,324	+6.67%
1973	4,100	+2.12%
1984	6,614	+4.44%
2000	12,317	+3.96%
2011	17,318	+3.15%
2022	20,259	+1.44%
Source: Instituto Nacional de Estadística y Censos; Centro Centroamericano de Población

For the 2011 census, Pital had a population of 17,318 inhabitants.

It is the third most populated of the canton, only behind Quesada and Aguas Zarcas, but surpassing La Fortuna and Florencia.

== Transportation ==
=== Road transportation ===
The district is covered by the following road routes:

- National Route 4
- National Route 250
- National Route 744
- National Route 745
- National Route 746

== Settlements ==
The 18 population centers of the district are:

- Pital (head of the district)
- Piedra Alegre
- El Encanto
- Los Ángeles
- Veracruz
- Chaparrón
- El Palmar
- Golfito
- Cuatro Esquinas
- La Josefina
- Puerto Escondido
- Yucatán
- Tierras Buenas
- Coopeisabel
- Santa Elena
- El Saíno
- La Trinchera
- San Marcos

== Economy ==
The economy is based on the extensive cultivation of pineapple for export purposes.

Livestock meat and milk also has great relevance in the area, as currently Pital Is the second district that produces more milk in the canton.

Pital center, has health services, educational, financial, food and some places of accommodation.

The trade is represented by supermarkets, shops and premises in which the sale of fast food, groceries, shoes, clothes and appliances and accessories in general stands out.
