= Aguas Zarcas =

District in San Carlos canton, Alajuela province, Costa Rica

- District
- Interactive map of Aguas Zarcas
- Aguas Zarcas district location in Costa Rica
- Coordinates: 10.4222943°N 84.3553697°W
- Country: Costa Rica
- Province: Alajuela
- Canton: San Carlos

Area
  - Total: 185.86 km^{2} (71.76 sq mi)
- Elevation: 489 m (1,604 ft)

Population (2011)
  - Total: 20,239
  - Density: 108.89/km^{2} (282.03/sq mi)
- Time zone: UTC−06:00
- Postal code: 21004

Aguas Zarcas is a district of the San Carlos canton, in the Alajuela province of Costa Rica.

== Toponymy ==
The name of Aguas Zarcas, comes from the hot spring waters that could well be called "Aguas de azul suave".

== History ==
From 1800, Germans, Italians and Spaniards formed the ancestors of Aguas Zarcas, the same ones that founded the Spanish colony.

Its colonizers were in charge of carrying out bites in the mountain to facilitate the arrival to the inhabitants that came from Villa Quesada looking for a place where to live.

== Geography ==
Aguas Zarcas has an area of 185.86 km^{2} making it the eighth district of the canton by area and an elevation of 489 metres.

It is located at an elevation range of 100 to 2100 meters above sea level.

This great variation of altitude is because in the South of the district are the mountain foothills of the Central Mountain Range, whereas in a northerly direction, the territory follows a clear descent towards the plains of San Carlos.

It is located in the northern region of the country. It borders the districts of Cutris to the north, La Palmera to the west, Pital and Venice to the east. While to the south it borders with the canton of Sarchí.

Its head, the city of Aguas Zarcas, from where it has an excellent view of the hills of the Juan Castro Blanco National Park, is located 16.6 km (30 minutes) NE of Quesada, and 88.4 km (2 hours 20 minutes) to the NW of San José the capital of the nation.

== Demographics ==
Historical population
Census	Pop.	±% p.a.
1927	1,914	—
1950	2,980	+1.94%
1963	5,097	+4.22%
1973	4,095	−2.17%
1984	6,052	+3.61%
2000	13,651	+5.22%
2011	20,239	+3.64%
2022	26,564	+2.50%
Source: Instituto Nacional de Estadística y Censos; Centro Centroamericano de Población

For the 2011 census, Aguas Zarcas had a population of 20,239 inhabitants making it the second most populated district in the canton.

== Transportation ==
=== Road transportation ===
The district is covered by the following road routes:

- National Route 4
- National Route 140
- National Route 250
- National Route 747
- National Route 749
- National Route 750
- National Route 751

== Locations ==
The 17 population centers of the district are:

- Aguas Zarcas (head of the district)
- Altamira
- Caño Negro
- Cerro Cortés
- Concepción
- Coope-San Juan
- Esquipulas
- Garabito
- La Caporal
- La Gloria
- Los Chiles
- Los Lotes
- Los Angeles (Las Delicias)
- Montecristo
- Pitalito
- Santa Fe
- San Jose

== Art and sport ==
The district is home to one of the country's Civic Centers, which are special sports and recreational areas, promoted by the government and supported by private entities, to promote citizen coexistence through art and sport.

== Culture ==
Every year there are popular festivals in the community, where there are mechanical games and bullfights. Also must be mentioned a kind of horse riding call El Tope, in which the riders wear their best clothes on their colorful horses.

== Economy ==
Poultry has an important presence, with chicken farms distributed throughout the district.

Local crops of cassava and pineapple (along with citrus production from other districts) focused on exports form the basis of the local agroindustry, represented by processing plants and packing of tropical fruits and tubers.

In the city of Aguas Zarcas, there are health, educational, financial, legal, lodging, post, car repair and construction services. Entertainment services are also offered with synthetic courts, gyms, swimming pools and nightlife venues.

In terms of trade, the sale of fast foods, groceries, shoes, clothes, appliances and accessories in general stands out. Also vegetables, chicken meats and milk produced locally are brought to the center to be sold at different points of sale.

== Tourist sites ==
The district shares hot mineral springs with the neighboring district of La Palmera.
