= Cutris =

District in San Carlos canton, Alajuela province, Costa Rica

- District
- Interactive map of Cutris
- Cutris district location in Costa Rica
- Coordinates: 10.6941715°N 84.3623616°W
- Country: Costa Rica
- Province: Alajuela
- Canton: San Carlos
- Creation: 26 November 1971

Area
  - Total: 848.01 km^{2} (327.42 sq mi)
- Elevation: 65 m (213 ft)

Population (2011)
  - Total: 10,334
  - Density: 12.186/km^{2} (31.562/sq mi)
- Time zone: UTC−06:00
- Postal code: 21011

Cutris is a district of the San Carlos canton, in the Alajuela province of Costa Rica.

== History ==
Cutris was created on 26 November 1971 by Decreto Ejecutivo 2083-G.

== Geography ==
Cutris has an area of 848.01 km^{2} which makes it the largest district in the canton by area and an elevation of 65 metres.

It is located in the northern region of the country and borders with 6 districts; Pocosol al oeste, Aguas Zarcas y Pital al Este, Palmera, Florencia y La Fortuna. While to the north it borders Nicaragua.

Its head, the town of Boca Arenal, is located 33.4 km (47 minutes) to the N of Ciudad Quesada and 133 km (2 hours 34 minutes) to the NW of San Jose the capital of the nation.

It presents a flat relief in the majority of its territory.

== Demographics ==
Historical population
Census	Pop.	±% p.a.
1973	7,382	—
1984	6,573	−1.05%
2000	7,892	+1.15%
2011	10,334	+2.48%
2022	11,323	+0.83%
Source: Instituto Nacional de Estadística y Censos; Centro Centroamericano de Población

For the 2011 census, Cutris had a population of 10,334 inhabitants, the seventh most populated of the canton.

== Transportation ==
=== Road transportation ===
The district is covered by the following road routes:

- National Route 4
- National Route 35
- National Route 227
- National Route 751
- National Route 753

== Settlements ==
Cutris has 24 population centers:

- Boca de Arenal (head of the district)
- Kooper
- Corazón de Jesús
- Terrón Colorado
- San Josecito
- Santa Teresa
- San Jorge
- Bella Vista
- San Pedro
- San Marcos
- San Joaquín
- Coopevega
- Las Cascadas
- Rico Tino
- Moravia
- Crucitas
- Chamorro
- Tiricias
- Boca Tapada
- Laurel Galán
- El Jardín
- Cocobolo
- San Francisco
- Betania

== Economy ==
At present, this district makes livestock and citrus cultivation (orange, pineapple and sugarcane), its main activities.

These provide employment to a large number of people, most of whom are Nicaraguan migrants who arrive in these lands attracted by the harvest.

In Boca de Arenal, (head of the district) you can find restaurants, grocery stores, butchers and a mill.
