= Zarcero (canton) =

Canton in Alajuela province, Costa Rica

- Canton
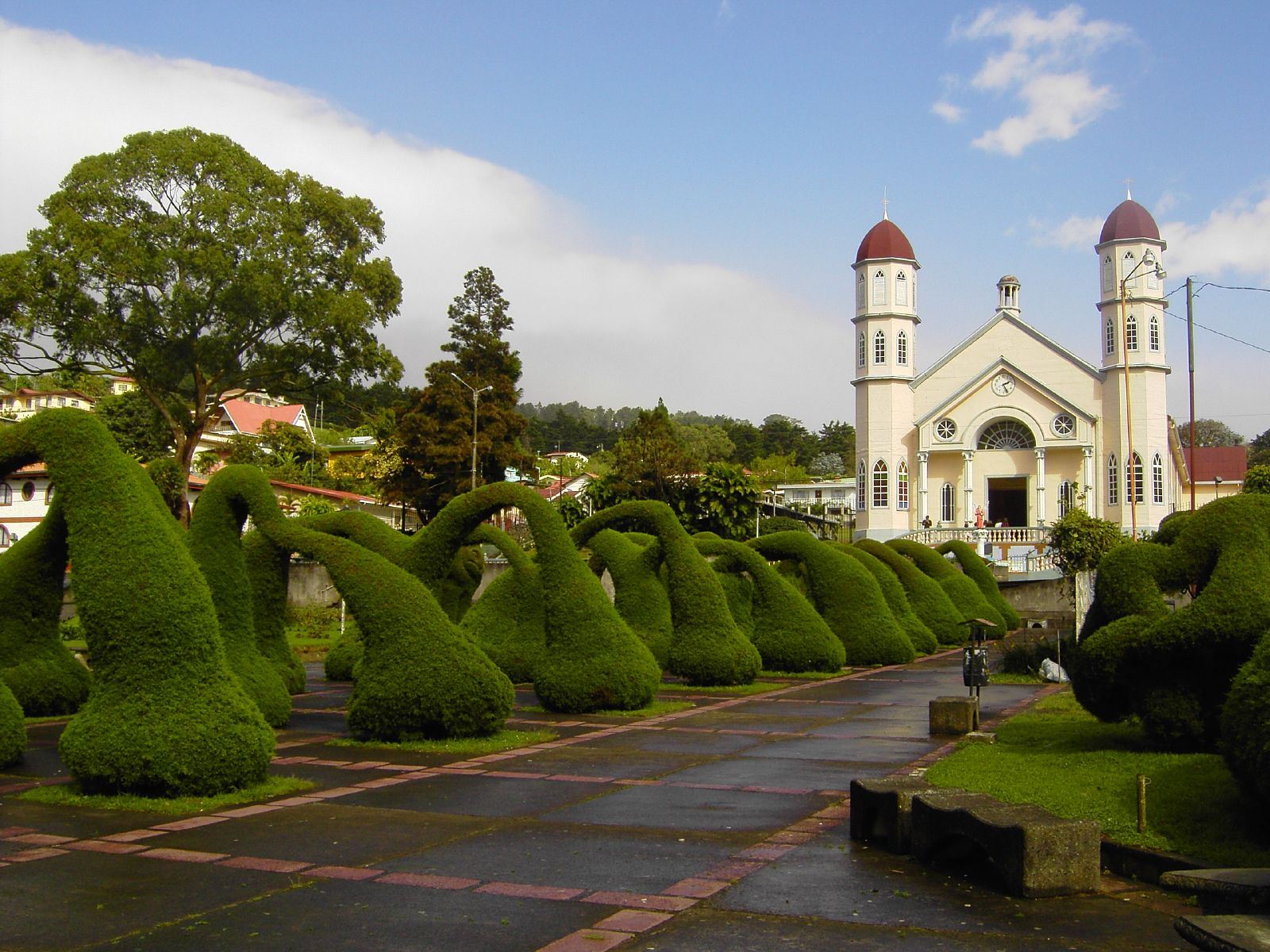
- Topiary in Zarcero

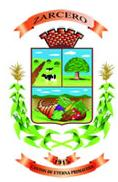
- Flag Seal
- Zarcero canton
- Zarcero canton location in Alajuela Province Zarcero canton location in Costa Rica
- Coordinates: 10.2188363°N 84.4163283°W
- Country: Costa Rica
- Province: Alajuela
- Creation: 21 June 1915
- Head city: Zarcero
- Districts: Districts: Zarcero; Laguna; Tapezco; Guadalupe; Palmira; Zapote; Brisas

Government
  - Type: Municipality
  - Body: Municipalidad de Zarcero

Area
  - Total: 155.13 km^{2} (59.90 sq mi)
- Elevation: 1,777 m (5,830 ft)

Population (2011)
  - Total: 12,205
  - Density: 78.676/km^{2} (203.77/sq mi)
- Time zone: UTC−06:00
- Canton code: 211
- Website: zarcero.go.cr

Zarcero is a canton in the Alajuela province of Costa Rica.

Hiking trails, pure water creeks, friendly people, landscapes and natural attractions are features of the area.

== Toponymy ==
The name means an abundance of the elmleaf or thornless blackberry plant, in Spanish called zarzamora.

It was originally given the name "Alfaro Ruiz" in remembrance of Juan Alfaro Ruíz, a hero from the National Campaign of 1856, or Filibuster War. The head city of the canton is the eponymous Zarcero district.

== History ==
Zarcero was created on 21 June 1915 by decree 27.

== Geography ==
Zarcero has an area of 155.13 km^{2} (59.90 sq mi) and a mean elevation of 1,777 metres.

To the north, the region borders canton San Carlos, to the south it borders canton Naranjo, to the east it borders canton Sarchí and to the west it borders the canton San Ramón.

The canton itself is diamond-shaped, with the Espina River forming the border on the northwest and the southwest sides. The Toro River forms the southeastern border, and the La Vieja River borders the northeast.

== Districts ==
The canton of Zarcero is subdivided into the following districts:

1. Zarcero
2. Laguna
3. Tapezco
4. Guadalupe
5. Palmira
6. Zapote
7. Brisas

== Demographics ==
Historical population
Census	Pop.	±% p.a.
1927	3,088	—
1950	4,676	+1.82%
1963	4,919	+0.39%
1973	6,342	+2.57%
1984	7,005	+0.91%
2000	10,845	+2.77%
2011	12,205	+1.08%
2022	15,153	+1.99%
Source: Instituto Nacional de Estadística y Censos; Centro Centroamericano de Población

For the 2011 census, Zarcero had a population of 12,205 inhabitants.

The canton has a 93% literacy rate, and by the year 2012 had a Human Development Index of 0.726 according to the United Nations Development Program. The region also has one of the lowest crime rates in the country.

== Transportation ==
=== Road transportation ===
The canton is covered by the following road routes:

- National Route 141
- National Route 741

== Economy ==
The economy of the canton is based on agriculture, primarily coffee and vegetables such as carrots, lettuce, potatoes and chiverre. Livestock and their products, especially "natilla Zarcero", a form of sour cream that originated in this area, make up another large portion of the economy. There are also smaller pastry, bread and other agriculturally-based industries in Zarcero. Tourism likewise has an impact on the economy. Two protected areas help attract tourist attention, a section of Juan Castro Blanco National Park and El Chayote Protected Zone.

One feature of the canton is Evangelista Blanco Brenes Park, a park with topiary-designed bushes located in front of the Iglesia de San Rafael Arcángel in the center of the city of Zarcero.
