= Venado, San Carlos =

District in San Carlos canton, Alajuela province, Costa Rica

Venado
- District
- Venado district
- Venado district location in Costa Rica
- Coordinates: 10.5654311°N 84.7725122°W
- Country: Costa Rica
- Province: Alajuela
- Canton: San Carlos
- Creation: 14 April 1966

Area
  - Total: 169.28 km^{2} (65.36 sq mi)
- Elevation: 252 m (827 ft)

Population (2011)
  - Total: 1,754
  - Density: 10.36/km^{2} (26.84/sq mi)
- Time zone: UTC−06:00
- Postal code: 21010

Venado is a district of the San Carlos canton, in the Alajuela province of Costa Rica.

== History ==
Venado was created on 14 April 1966 by Decreto Ejecutivo 18. Segregated from Grecia canton.

== Geography ==
Venado has an area of 169.28 km^{2} which makes it the seventh district of the canton by area and an elevation of 252 metres.

Located three kilometers from the head of the district, there are caverns, which are 2000 meters long and are integrated by galleries, rooms, bathrooms, tunnels, windows, vents and chimneys.

In addition to the caves, there are rivers, forests and waterfalls.

It limits the northeast with the districts of Monterrey, the southeast with La Fortuna, the west and southwest with Tilarán and the northwest with the canton of Guatuso.

The direct connection that is offered by bus from the place is to Quesada.

== Demographics ==
Historical population
Census	Pop.	±% p.a.
1973	3,712	—
1984	1,793	−6.40%
2000	1,705	−0.31%
2011	1,754	+0.26%
2022	1,986	+1.14%
Source: Instituto Nacional de Estadística y Censos; Centro Centroamericano de Población

For the 2011 census, Venado had a population of 1,754 inhabitants.

== Transportation ==
=== Road transportation ===
The district is covered by the following road routes:

- National Route 4
- National Route 734

== Settlements ==
The 14 population centers of the district are:

- La Tigra
- Jicarito
- Santa Martha
- Santa Lucía
- Linda Vista
- El Cacao
- San Isidro
- Cantanuario
- El Burío
- Sangregado
- La Esperanza
- Venado
- Santa Eulalia
- Puerto Seco

== Economy ==
The main productive activity is the cattle raising of milk and meat and its derivatives (like the manufacture of cheeses) together with the production of roots and tubers.
