= List of volcanoes in Costa Rica =

This is a list of active and extinct volcanoes in Costa Rica.

Name	Type	Elevation	Location	Last eruption
Aguas Zarcas volcanic field	extinct, one hill and eight hillocks	160 metres (520 ft) to 528 metres (1,732 ft)	10.374611°N 84.338833°W	-
Arenal	dormant	1,670 metres (5,480 ft)	10.463°N 84.703°W	2010
Barva	dormant	2,906 metres (9,534 ft)	10.135°N 84.10°W	6050 BC
Cacho Negro		2,150 metres (7,050 ft)	10.195833°N 84.046111°W	-
Chato	crater lake, hill	1,140 metres (3,740 ft)	10.441944°N 84.688056°W	1500 BC
Chopo	extinct	402 metres (1,319 ft)	10.470430°N 85.064185°W	
Congo	dormant	2,014 metres (6,608 ft)	10.25°N 84.233333°W	9000 BC
Hule	crater lake	740 metres (2,430 ft)	10.295278°N 84.208889°W	
Irazú	dormant	3,432 metres (11,260 ft)	9.979°N 83.852°W	1994
Miravalles	dormant	2,028 metres (6,654 ft)	10.784°N 85.153°W	1946
Orosí	dormant	1,659 metres (5,443 ft)	10.980°N 85.473°W	1500 BC
Pelado	extinct, hill	680 metres (2,230 ft)	10.368872°N 85.014292°W	-
Platanar	dormant	2,183 metres (7,162 ft)	10.3000174°N 84.3660879°W	117,000 BC and later (Holocene)
Poás	active	2,708 metres (8,885 ft)	10.20°N 84.233°W	April 2025
Poco Sol	crater lake	789 metres (2,589 ft)	10.35°N 84.67°W	-
Porvenir	dormant	2,267 metres (7,438 ft)	10.271724°N 84.360967°W	
Rincón de la Vieja	active	1,916 metres (6,286 ft)	10.830°N 85.324°W	April 2020, hydrothermal, gas and steam.
Río Cuarto	crater lake	380 metres (1,250 ft)	10.356944°N 84.216389°W	
Tenorio	dormant	1,916 metres (6,286 ft)	10.673°N 85.015°W	-
Tilarán	extinct, hill	634 metres (2,080 ft)	10.451°N 84.978°W	2,580,000 BC–117,000 BC (Pleistocene)
Tortuguero	extinct, hill	119 metres (390 ft)	10.584327°N 83.527759°W	
Turrialba	active	3,340 metres (10,960 ft)	10.025°N 83.767°W	October 28, 2019
El Viejo	extinct	2,122 metres (6,962 ft)	10.26005°N 84.32887°W	

== See also ==
- List of lakes of Costa Rica
- Central America Volcanic Arc
- Lists of volcanoes
  - List of volcanoes in El Salvador
  - List of volcanoes in Guatemala
  - List of volcanoes in Honduras
  - List of volcanoes in Nicaragua
  - List of volcanoes in Panama
