= Lake Lancaster Abajo =

Lake in Costa Rica

- Location in Costa Rica
- Coordinates: 10.012714°N 83.596446°W
- Type: lake
- Surface area: 0.05 square kilometres (12 acres)
- Max. depth: 16.9 metres (55 ft)
- Surface elevation: 330 metres (1,080 ft)

Lake Lancaster Abajo (Spanish: Laguna Lancaster Abajo), together with Lake Lancaster Arriba are part of two lakes in the Limón province of Costa Rica, collectively referred as the Lancaster Lakes.

== Location ==
The Lancaster lakes are located in a private property next to Reventazón River, and 7.35 kilometers SW of the Reventazón Dam. Lancaster Abajo is located at 100 m lower elevation and to the south of Lancaster Arriba.

== Physical aspects ==
Lake Lancaster Abajo is of landslide origin, it possesses cool stream water inputs and is probably stratified through the year due to its relative depth.

== Conservation area ==
The Bonilla-Bonillita Lacustrine Wetland created in 1994 is composed by this lake and Lake Lancaster Arriba, Lake Bonilla and Lake Bonillita and their surrounding areas.

== See also ==
- List of lakes in Costa Rica
