= Lake Bonillita =

Lake in Costa Rica

- Location in Costa Rica
- Coordinates: 9.9924°N 83.6020°W
- Type: lake
- Surface area: 0.06 square kilometres (15 acres)
- Max. depth: 20 metres (66 ft)
- Surface elevation: 450 metres (1,480 ft)

Lake Bonillita (Spanish: Laguna Bonillita) is a freshwater lake in the Limón province of Costa Rica.

== Location ==
The Bonillita and Bonilla lakes are located in a private property next to Reventazón River, and 9.66 kilometers SW of the Reventazón Dam.

== Physical aspects ==
Lake Bonillita is of landslide origin.

== Conservation area ==
The Bonilla-Bonillita Lacustrine Wetland created in 1994 is composed by this lake and Lake Lancaster Arriba, Lake Lancaster Abajo and Lake Bonilla and their surrounding areas.

== See also ==
- List of lakes in Costa Rica
