= Lake Lancaster Arriba =

Lake in Costa Rica

- Location in Costa Rica
- Coordinates: 10.021014°N 83.595426°W
- Type: lake
- Surface area: 0.013 square kilometres (3.2 acres)
- Max. depth: 5.9 metres (19 ft)
- Surface elevation: 430 metres (1,410 ft)

Lake Lancaster Arriba (Spanish: Laguna Lancaster Arriba), together with Lake Lancaster Abajo are part of two lakes in the Limón province of Costa Rica, collectively referred as the Lancaster Lakes.

== Location ==
The Lancaster lakes are located in a private property next to Reventazón River, and 7.35 kilometers SW of the Reventazón Dam. Lancaster Arriba is located at 100 m higher elevation and to the north of Lancaster Abajo.

== Physical aspects ==
Lake Lancaster Arriba is of landslide origin and its surface is almost completely covered by aquatic vegetation including hyacinths and ferns.

== Conservation area ==
The Bonilla-Bonillita Lacustrine Wetland created in 1994 is composed by this lake and Lake Lancaster Abajo, Lake Bonilla and Lake Bonillita and their surrounding areas.

=== Environmental damage claims ===
At the time of the construction of the Reventazón Dam, in 2016 and 2017, local preservation groups exposed that the wall between Reventazón river and Lake Lancaster Arriba was being excavated for raw materials for the dam. After a series of investigations, no such action was confirmed.

== See also ==
- List of lakes in Costa Rica
