= Poás Volcano National Park =

National park in Costa Rica

- IUCN category II (national park)
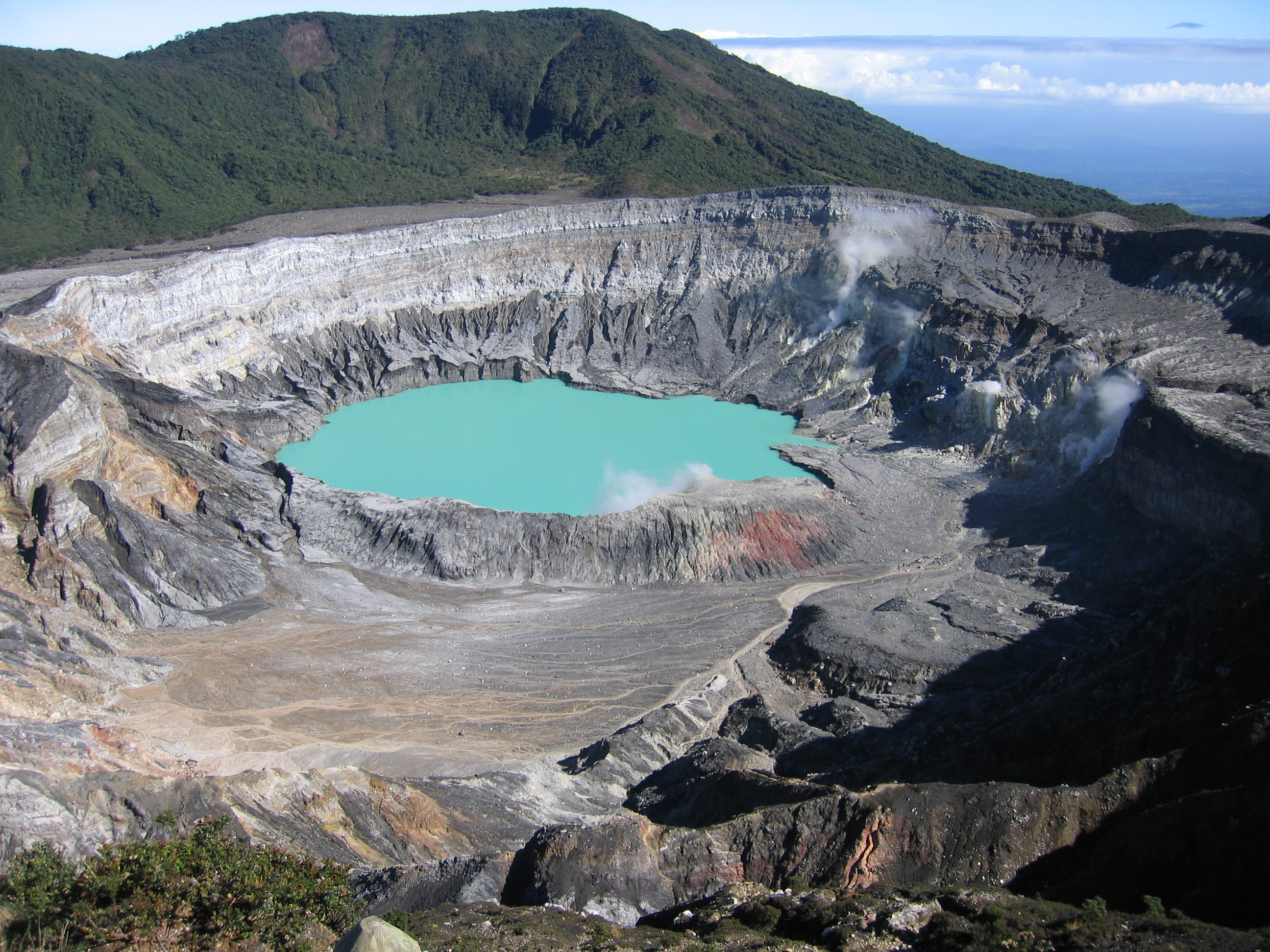
- Poás Volcano National Park area
- Location: Alajuela Province, Costa Rica
- Coordinates: 10°12′05″N 84°14′30″W
- Area: 65 square kilometres (25 mi^{2})
- Established: 25 January 1971
- Governing body: National System of Conservation Areas (SINAC)
- Website: https://www.sinac.go.cr/EN-US/ac/accvc/pnvp
- Location in Costa Rica

Poás Volcano National Park (Spanish: Parque Nacional Volcán Poás) is a national park in Costa Rica that covers an area of approximately 65 square kilometres (16,000 acres); the summit of Poás Volcano located within the park is at an elevation of 2,700 metres (8,900 ft). The park was established on 25 January 1971. Depending on conditions, visitors can walk all the way to the edge of the main crater, but on 13 April 2017 the park was closed to visitors due to an explosive eruption on the evening of 12 April. Still further eruptions, including on Easter, 16 April, caused the park to be closed until August 2018.

Over the years, the park has been frequently closed to visitors due to precautions because of water vapor and sulfuric acid gas emissions. The status of the park being subject to change, potential visitors should check the current conditions at the park. Poas Volcano erupted twice briefly in September 2019.

The volcano is located in the Central Conservation Area located in the Alajuela Province near the Pacific coast of Costa Rica, which encompasses the area around the Poás Volcano. The main crater is 290 metres (950 ft) wide and is quite active with frequent small geyser and lava eruptions, however the last major eruptions were during 1952–54. Two more craters make up parts of the park, the extinct Von Frantzuis crater and the Botos crater. Lake Botos is a beautiful cold, green water crater lake with a diameter of 370 metres (1,200 ft). The Botos crater has not erupted for about 7,500 years. Well-marked trails lead to the two inactive craters, conditions permitting.

== Flora and fauna ==
The park maintains a variety of wild plant and animal species, such as the Poas magnolia bird species, including the clay-colored robin, black guan, resplendent quetzal and varieties of hummingbirds, tanagers, flycatchers and toucans. Mammals in the park are not abundant, but include coyotes, long-tailed weasels, Dice's cottontail rabbits, striped hog-nosed skunks, Deppe's squirrels, and nine-banded armadillos.

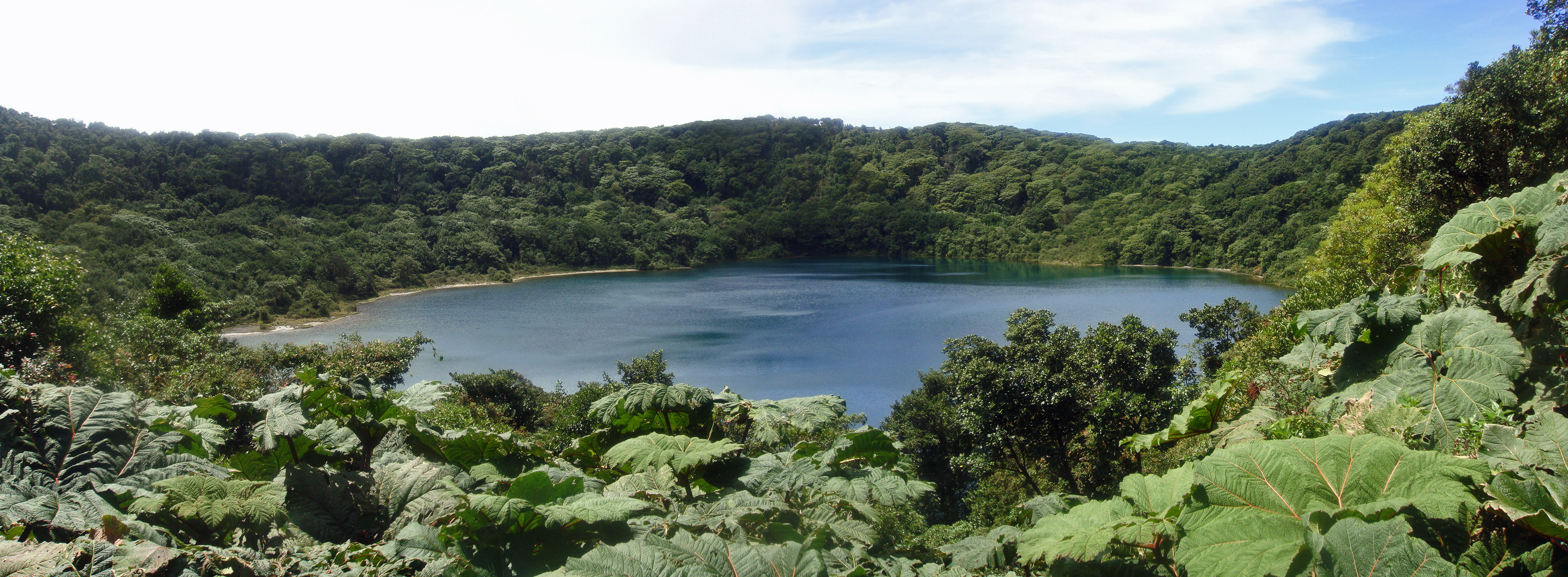
Lake Botos is an inactive crater also located within the Poás Volcano National Park.

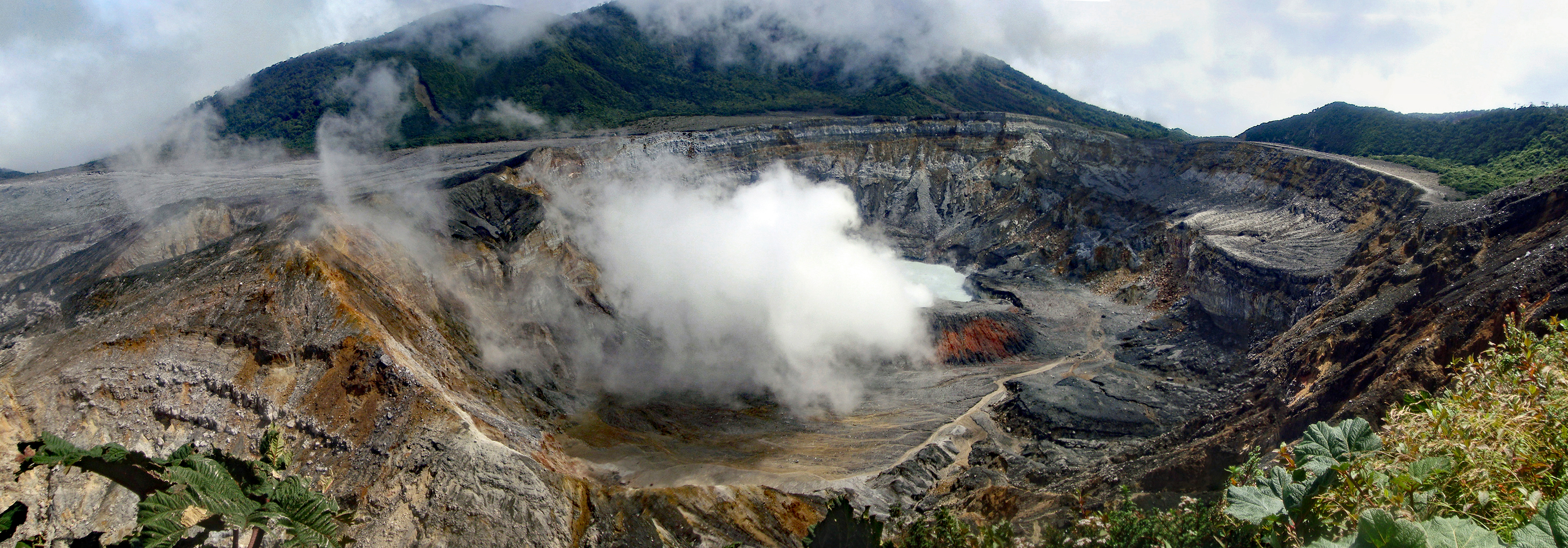
Fumarole activity at the Poás crater

== See also ==
- List of national parks of Costa Rica
- List of volcanoes in Costa Rica
- Tourism in Costa Rica
