= Porvenir Volcano =

Volcano in Costa Rica

- Location within Costa Rica

Highest point
- Elevation: 2,267 metres (7,438 ft)
- Prominence: 430 metres (1,410 ft)
- Coordinates: 10°16′18″N 84°21′39″W

Geology
- Rock age: Holocene
- Mountain type: Volcano
- Volcanic arc: Central America Volcanic Arc
- Last eruption: Unknown

Porvenir Volcano is an inactive volcano, of stratovolcano type, in Costa Rica. Located in San Carlos canton of Alajuela, 3km from the related Platanar Volcano and part of the Cordillera Central mountain range. It is within the Juan Castro Blanco National Park.

== Physical aspects ==
Towering 430m over an area of 15 km2, with an eroded crater of around 160 m diameter, it is located in the same line as Poás Volcano, Barva Volcano and Irazú Volcano. The crater border is truncated in the east side by a fault, inside of which there is a small cone of around 20 to 40 meters high, to the south there is another possible cone. Lake Congo is located on its slopes to the west as well as Lake Pozo Verde.

== Activity ==
There are no reports of primary or secondary activity.
