= Lake Bonilla =

Lake in Costa Rica

- Location in Costa Rica
- Coordinates: 9.9924°N 83.6020°W
- Type: lake
- Surface area: 0.308 square kilometres (76 acres)
- Max. depth: 27 metres (89 ft)
- Surface elevation: 380 metres (1,250 ft)

Lake Bonilla (Spanish: Laguna Bonilla) is a freshwater lake in the Limón province of Costa Rica.

== Location ==
The Bonilla and Bonillita lakes are located in a private property next to Reventazón River, and 9.66 kilometers SW of the Reventazón Dam.

== Physical aspects ==
Lake Bonilla is of landslide origin.

== Conservation area ==
The Bonilla-Bonillita Lacustrine Wetland created in 1994 is composed by this lake and Lake Lancaster Arriba, Lake Lancaster Abajo and Lake Bonillita and their surrounding areas.

== See also ==
- List of lakes in Costa Rica
