= El Viejo Volcano =

Volcano in Costa Rica

- Location within Costa Rica

Highest point
- Elevation: 2,122 m (6,962 ft)
- Listing: List of volcanoes in Costa Rica
- Coordinates: 10°15′36″N 84°19′44″W

Geography
- Location: Costa Rica
- Parent range: Cordillera Central

Geology
- Mountain type: Stratovolcano
- Volcanic arc: Central America Volcanic Arc

Climbing
- First ascent: 1911

The El Viejo Volcano, (Spanish: Volcán El Viejo, translates as The Old Man Volcano) is possibly an inactive volcano in Costa Rica, situated in the Cordillera Central range near the Poás Volcano and within the Juan Castro Blanco National Park. The highest point of the volcano is at an elevation of 2,122 meters.
