= Bonilla-Bonillita Lacustrine Wetland =

Wildlife Refuge in Costa Rica

- Location within Costa Rica
- Location: Costa Rica
- Nearest city: Turrialba, Cartago
- Coordinates: 10.021014°N 83.595426°W
- Area: 0.50 square kilometres (120 acres)
- Designation: H09
- Established: 21 February 1994
- Governing body: Caribbean La Amistad Conservation Area (ACLAC), National System of Conservation Areas (SINAC)

Bonilla-Bonillita Lacustrine Wetland (Spanish: Humedal Lacustrino Bonilla-Bonillita) is a protected area in Costa Rica, managed under the Caribbean La Amistad Conservation Area and created in 1994 under decree 23004-MlRENEM to protect the Lake Bonilla, Lake Bonillita on the west side of Reventazón River, and Lake Lancaster Arriba and Lake Lancaster Abajo on the east side of Reventazón River.
