= Aguas Zarcas volcanic field =

Volcanic field in Costa Rica

- Location within Costa Rica

Highest point
- Elevation: 621 metres (2,037 ft) (Morera hillock)
- Listing: List of volcanoes in Costa Rica
- Coordinates: 10°22′29″N 84°20′20″W

Geology
- Rock age: Holocene
- Mountain type: Volcanic field

Aguas Zarcas volcanic field is a field of pyroclastic cones located in the Aguas Zarcas district, San Carlos canton of the Alajuela province, Costa Rica.

== Physical aspects ==
Located on the North flank of the Platanar Volcano, it is composed of at least nine cones, of which one is recognized as a hill (cerro) and the remaining eight as hillocks (loma).

The sides of the cones are slanted between 10 and 30 degrees, the cones have an elongated shape in the East to West direction and the complex runs in the North to South direction, evidence of tectonic origin. Previous lava flow activity is appreciated in some of the cones.

=== Hill and hillocks of the volcanic field ===
Name	Elevation (m)	Prominence (m)	Coordinates	Notes
Los Chiles hill	250	130	10.459027°N 84.340614°W	Also known as Altamira. Largest quarry in the area, east side covered with vegetation. Pineapple production in the surrounding areas.
Valle Hermoso hillock	215	50	10.446994°N 84.335323°W	Flattest of the cones, surrounded by cattle pasture.
Vuelta de Kopper hillock	290	100	10.435351°N 84.333596°W	Named due to the nearby town. Very voluminous, elongated shape. There is an access way to the top.
Pital hillock	160	-	10.444441°N 84.273369°W	Very eroded. Near the Pital town.
Barrantes hillock	290	80	10.417244°N 84.306295°W	There is a quarry at the top, and a dense forest covers the remaining structure. There is an access way to the top.
Juan Murillo hillocks	518	70	10.382865°N 84.328607°W	Crater remains. Located 2 km NE of the town center, easily visible. There is a quarry at its base.
Morera hillocks	621	100	10.363878°N 84.322150°W	Crater remains. Located 2 km SE of the town center, there is an access way to the top.
Buenos Aires hillock	461	60	10.378326°N 84.303432°W	Used to be a quarry, but the sides have now recovered vegetation, there is an access way to the top. It is next to Route 140, and the Buenos Aires town is at the other side.
Unnamed hillock	200	20		

== See also ==
- List of volcanoes in Costa Rica
