= List of lakes of Costa Rica =

This is a list of lakes, reservoirs, and water bodies in Costa Rica.

Name	Type	Elevation (m)	Area (km²)	Depth (m)	Coordinates
L. Arenal	artificial	540	80.7690	55.00	10.518°N 84.9008°W
L. Asunción	artificial?	3340	0.0005	1.00	9.576°N 83.759°W
L. Barva	crater	2840	0.0080	7.90	10.135°N 84.107°W
L. Bonilla	landslide	380	0.3080	27.00	9.992635°N 83.602042°W
L. Bonillita	landslide	450	0.0600	20.00	9.992089°N 83.611465°W
L. Bosque Alegre	crater	740	0.0060	4.00	10.299208°N 84.218698°W
L. Botos	crater	2580	0.1033	9.00	10.187086°N 84.227267°W
L. Cachí	reservoir	970	3.2400	80	9.827222°N 83.816667°W
L. Las Camelias (wildlife refuge)					10.9628°N 85.1014°W
L. Campo Dos	artificial	1036	0.0010	1.50	8.727°N 82.937°W
L. Campo Tres	artificial	1097	0.0010	2.60	8.723°N 82.935°W
L. Carara	oxbow	16	0.0210	3.50	9.8°N 84.598°W
L. Castillo	artificial	750	0.0010	3.50	9.033°N 83.593°W
L. Cedeño	landslide	610	0.0640	3.00	10.484835°N 84.703333°W
L. Cerro Chato	crater	1050	0.0280	17.90	10.444°N 84.691°W
L. Chirripó 1	glacial	3520	0.0780	22.00	9.485°N 83.498°W
L. Chitaría	artificial	720	0.0003	1.00	9.937°N 83.597°W
L. Cocoritos	artificial	520	0.0020	1.00	10.377°N 84.631°W
L. Congo	crater	740	0.1490	14.60	10.305262°N 84.216443°W
L. Copey	crater	2460	0.0050	2.00	10.139°N 84.093°W
L. Cote	crater?	650	1.9830	11.00	10.583°N 84.912°W
L. Cuipilapa	artificial	480	0.0010	1.90	10.67°N 85.164°W
L. Ditkebi	glacial	3493	0.0120	7.00	9.47°N 83.482°W
L. Espabelosa	lava flow	440	0.0060	3.00	10.661°N 85.183°W
L. Estero Blanco	lava flow	430	0.0150	2.80	10.667°N 85.204°W
L. Foster	artificial	40	0.0003	1.50	8.69°N 83.102°W
L. Fraijanes	landslide	1650	0.2200	6.20	10.125312°N 84.191079°W
L. Gamboa	wetland	1460	0.0030	2.00	8.722°N 82.988°W
L. Gandoca	oxbow	0	0.0730	6.40	9.587°N 82.604°W
L. González	landslide	710	0.0060	8.10	10.286717°N 84.464253°W
L. Hule	crater	740	0.5470	19.80	10.295278°N 84.208889°W
L. Jalapa					10.531514°N 84.031380°W
L. La Palma	lava flow	570	0.0500	10.80	10.487°N 84.716°W
L. Lancaster Abajo	landslide	330	0.0500	16.90	10.012714°N 83.596446°W
L. Lancaster Arriba	landslide	430	0.0130	2.00	10.021014°N 83.595426°W
L. Las Brisas	lava flow	300	0.0080	2.20	10.65°N 85.201°W
L. Los Juncos Far	lava flow	440	0.0100	1.80	10.669°N 85.19°W
L. Los Juncos Near	lava flow	440	0.0080	1.70	10.668°N 85.191°W
L. Madre Vieja	oxbow	16	0.0300	3.00	9.81°N 84.598°W
L. Manuel	-	2000	0.0273	-	9.689420°N 83.978430°W
L. Maquenque					10.751869°N 84.103543°W
L. Maria Aguilar	landslide	770	0.0270	6.90	10.301054°N 84.187946°W
L. Martillete	lava flow	410	0.0350	2.50	10.654°N 85.194°W
L. Morrenas 0	glacial	3496	0.0110	2.90	9.492°N 83.485°W
L. Morrenas 1	glacial	3477	0.0560	8.30	9.494°N 83.487°W
L. Morrenas 2	glacial	3475	0.0230	1.30	9.495°N 83.49°W
L. Morrenas 2a	glacial	3532	0.0090	0.90	9.49°N 83.49°W
L. Morrenas 3	glacial	3472	0.0310	8.10	9.408°N 83.49°W
L. Morrenas 4	glacial	3466	0.0060	3.00	9.5°N 83.489°W
L. Osa l	artificial	30	0.0020	1.50	8.684°N 83.505°W
L. Paraguas					8.789164°N 82.987734°W
L. Peje					10.178900°N 83.497800°W
L. Poco Sol	landslide	776	0.0290	11.30	10.352°N 84.672°W
L. Pozo Verde	landslide	1950			10.262385°N 84.355764°W
L. Ramirez	crater?	570	0.0100	2.50	10.732°N 85.017°W
L. Refugio	glacial	3450	0.0090	0.90	9.503°N 83.493°W
L. Río Cuarto	crater	380	0.3150	66.00	10.356944°N 84.216389°W
L. San Francisco	artificial	90	0.0030	2.50	10.458°N 84.405°W
L. San Joaquín	wetland	976	0.0540	1.00	8.828°N 82.953°W
P. San Miguel	swamp	10	0.3000	2.00	9.573°N 82.648°W
L. San Pablo	lava flow	450	0.0450	2.50	10.661°N 85.18°W
L. San Vito	artificial	990	0.0020	3.50	8.827°N 82.96°W
L. Sierpe	wetland	16	1.0280	2.20	8.782°N 83.328°W
L. Tres de Junio	artificial	2670	0.0005	1.50	9.667°N 83.852°W
L. University	artificial	760	0.0090	1.00	9.363°N 83.694°W
L. Vaca Blanca	artificial	94	0.0050	2.50	10.455°N 84.397°W
L. Vueltas	landslide	270	0.0030	3.00	8.967°N 83.178°W
L. Zent	oxbow	17	0.0130	2.00	10.032°N 83.282°W
L. Zoncho	landslide	1190	0.0080	2.60	8.813°N 82.963°W

== See also ==
- List of volcanoes in Costa Rica, which includes the crater lakes listed.
- Haberyan, K.A.; Horn, S.P. (1999). "Chemical and physical characteristics of seven volcanic lakes in Costa Rica". Brenesia. 51: 85–95.
- Horn, S.P.; Haberyan, K.A. (1993). "Costa Rican Lakes: Chemical and physical properties". National Geographic Research & Exploration. 9: 86–103.
- Horn, S.P.; Haberyan, K.A. Kappelle, M. (ed.). "Lakes of Costa Rica. Chapter 19". Costa Rican Ecosystems. Chicago: University of Chicago Press: 656–682.
- Horn, S.P.; Orvis, K.H.; Haberyan, K.A. "Limnología de las lagunas glaciales en el páramo del Chirripó, Costa Rica" (in Spanish).
- Horn, S.P.; Johanson, E.N.; Haberyan, K.A.; Boehm, M.S.; Johanson, J.L.; Sánchez, M.; Hernández V., M. (2018). "Initial limnological observations of five lakes in southern Pacific Costa Rica".
- Umaña V., G.; Haberyan, K.A.; Horn, S.P. (1999). Wetzel, R.G.; Gopal, B. (eds.). "Limnology in Costa Rica". Limnology in Developing Countries 2.: 33–62.
