= Laguna Poco Sol =

Lake Poco Sol
- Location in Costa Rica
- Coordinates: 10.35°N 84.67°W
- Type: Crater lake
- Max. length: 1 km (0.62 mi)
- Surface area: 1.01 km^{2} (0.39 sq mi)
- Max. depth: 11 m (36 ft)
- Surface elevation: 789 m (2,589 ft)

Lake Poco Sol (from Spanish, "Little Sunshine"), Laguna Poco Sol or Laguna Pocosol, is a volcanic lake in Costa Rica, in the Cordillera de Tilarán.

The lake lies at an altitude of 789 metres (2,589 ft) in a 200 metres (660 ft) wide depression. The depth of the lake is about 11.5 metres (38 ft).

Other volcanic features in the area include breccia, lahar deposits, lava flows and tuffs. The lake may be a landslide scar, or a crater left by a phreatic explosion. It is of probable Pleistocene age. It is constructed within the andesitic Monteverde Formation, which was erupted between 2.1 and 1 million years ago.

Hot springs, mud pots and deposits of sulfur are found both at the lake and near the Río Penas Blancas. The area has been investigated for harnessing geothermal energy. The geothermal activity may be the source of the name Pocosol.

The active volcano Arenal lies north-northwest of Laguna Poco Sol. Arenal along with Cerro Chato between Arenal and Laguna Poco Sol and Cerro Pocosol south of Laguna Poco Sol may be located along a zone of tectonic weakness that was accompanied by northeast-migrating volcanism.

== See also ==
- List of lakes in Costa Rica
- List of volcanoes in Costa Rica
