= Siquirres River Basin Protected Zone =

Protected area in Costa Rica

- Zona Protectora Cuenca del Río Siquirres
- IUCN category VI (protected area with sustainable use of natural resources)
- Location within Costa Rica
- Location: Costa Rica
- Coordinates: 10.063°N 83.541°W
- Area: 6.70 square kilometres (2.59 sq mi)
- Established: 13 December 1995
- Governing body: National System of Conservation Areas (SINAC)

Siquirres River Basin Protected Zone (Spanish: Zona Protectora Cuenca del Río Siquirres), is a protected area in Costa Rica, managed under the Caribbean La Amistad Conservation Area, it was created in 1995 by decree 24785-MIRENEM.
