= Cerro Tilarán =

Andesitic shield volcano in Costa Rica

Cerro Tilarán Volcano
- Location within Costa Rica

Highest point
- Elevation: 634 m (2,080 ft)
- Listing: List of volcanoes in Costa Rica
- Coordinates: 10°27′3″N 84°58′40″W

Geography
- Location: Costa Rica
- Parent range: Tilarán Range

Geology
- Rock age: 1.0 Myr
- Mountain type: Shield volcano
- Volcanic arc: Central America Volcanic Arc
- Last eruption: Pleistocene

The Cerro Tilarán Volcano is an andesitic shield volcano in the Tilaran Range in Costa Rica.
