= Pacuare River Forest Reserve =

Protected area in Costa Rica

- Reserva Forestal Río Pacuare
- IUCN category VI (protected area with sustainable use of natural resources)
- Location within Costa Rica
- Location: Costa Rica
- Coordinates: 10.027°N 83.461°W
- Area: 131.88 square kilometres (50.92 sq mi)
- Established: 26 December 1985
- Governing body: National System of Conservation Areas (SINAC)

Pacuare River Forest Reserve (Spanish: Reserva Forestal Río Pacuare), is a protected area in Costa Rica, managed under the Caribbean La Amistad Conservation Area, it was created in 1985 by law 7018.
