= Pelado Hill =

Inactive volcano of Costa Rica

- Location within Costa Rica

Highest point
- Elevation: 680 metres (2,230 ft)
- Coordinates: 10°22′08″N 85°00′51″W

Naming
- Native name: Cerro Pelado (Spanish)

Geology
- Mountain type: Extinct volcano
- Volcanic arc: Central America Volcanic Arc
- Last eruption: Unknown

Pelado Hill, from Spanish Cerro Pelado, also known as Pelado Peak, is an extinct volcano in Costa Rica, located 12 kilometres (7.5 mi) southeast from Cañas (canton).

== Toponymy ==
Pelado translates to bare or naked, in this case, lack of forest canopy.

== Physical aspects ==
Extinct for millions of years and highly eroded, the skeletal structure of the volcano caldera can still be appreciated. There is secondary activity nearby with hot springs and minerals.

== Social and economic activity ==
The hill is located in a private area made of eight properties and around 200 hectares (490 acres), tourism in the area boomed from 2007 onwards, as trails were built towards the peak of the hill and some rudimentary visitor facilities were built. Social networks such as Instagram and their influencers promoted the area due to the photogenic nature of the place.

== See also ==
- List of volcanoes in Costa Rica
