= Arenal Huetar Norte Conservation Area =

Administrative area of Costa Rica

- Área de Conservación Arenal Huetar Norte
- Location of the area, labeled ACAHN in the northwest of the country.
- Location: Guanacaste Province, Alajuela Province Costa Rica
- Coordinates: 10.722468°N 84.673938°W
- Governing body: National System of Conservation Areas (SINAC)
- Website: https://www.sinac.go.cr/EN-US/ac/ACAHN

Arenal Huetar Norte Conservation Area (Spanish: Área de Conservación Arenal Huetar Norte, ACAHN), is an administrative area which is managed by SINAC for the purposes of conservation in the northern part of Costa Rica. It contains two national parks, a forest reserve, and four wildlife refuges.

== Protected areas ==
- Arenal Volcano National Park
- Arenal Volcano Emergency Forest Reserve
- Caño Negro Wildlife Refuge
- Border Corridor Wildlife Refuge
- Juan Castro Blanco National Park
- Laguna Las Camelias Wildlife Refuge
- Maquenque National Wildlife Refuge
