= Lake Pozo Verde =

Lake in Costa Rica

- Location in Costa Rica
- Coordinates: 10.262385°N 84.355764°W
- Type: lake
- Max. depth: 15 metres (49 ft)
- Surface elevation: 1,850 metres (6,070 ft)

Lake Pozo Verde (Spanish: Laguna Pozo Verde, translated as Lake Green Pond), is a lake of volcanic origin in San Carlos, Alajuela province, Costa Rica.

== Location ==
Lake Pozo Verde is located in the Juan Castro Blanco National Park, on the slopes of Porvenir Volcano.

== See also ==
- List of lakes in Costa Rica
