= Lake Botos =

Lake in Costa Rica

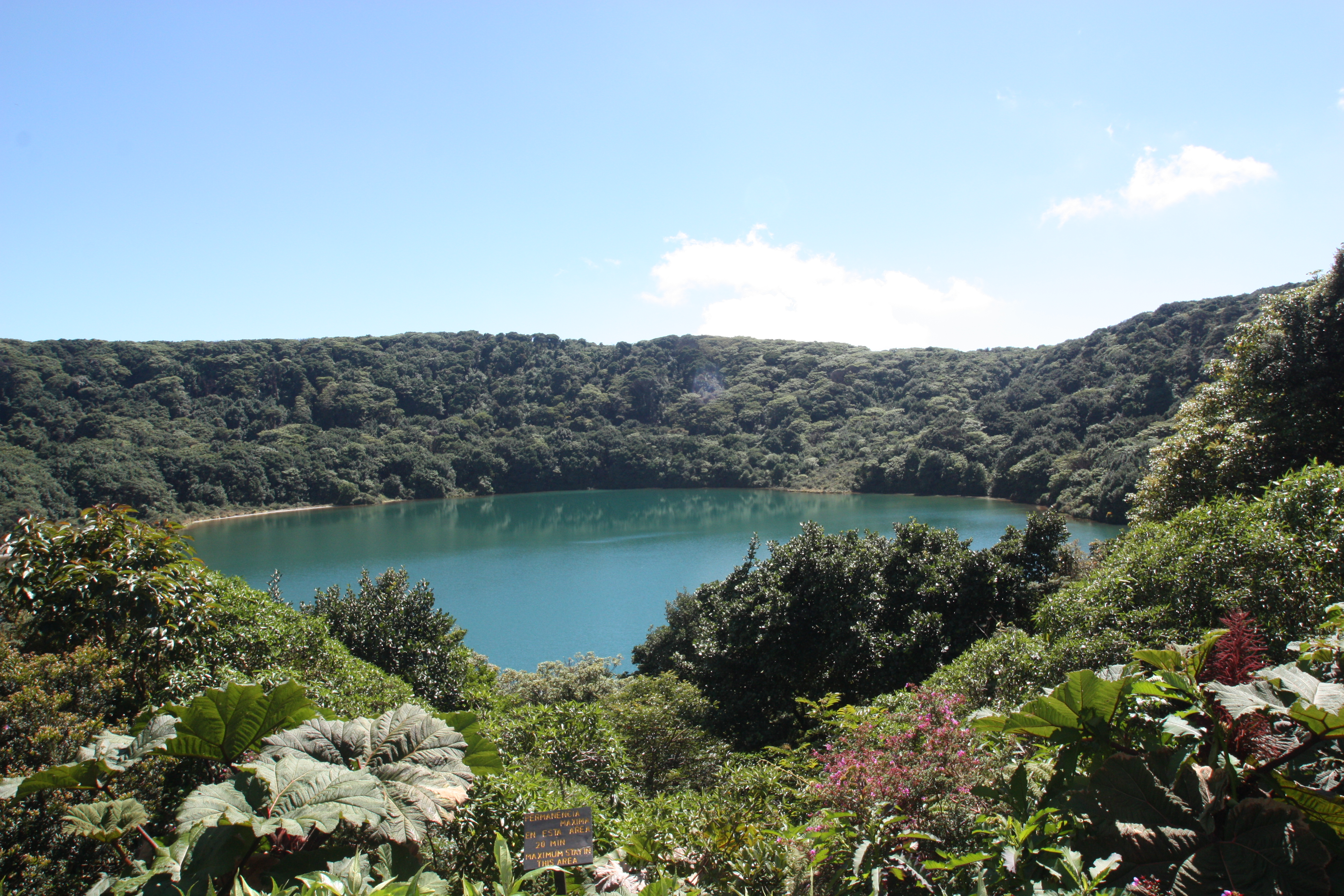

- Location in Costa Rica
- Coordinates: 10.187086°N 84.227267°W
- Type: crater lake
- Max. length: 365 m (0.227 mi)
- Surface area: 0.1033 km^{2} (0.0399 sq mi)
- Max. depth: 9 m (30 ft)
- Surface elevation: 2,580 m (8,460 ft)

Lake Botos (Spanish: Laguna Botos) is a crater lake located inside the Poás Volcano National Park.

== Location ==
It is located in Alajuela province of Costa Rica.

== Physical aspects ==
Lake Botos is located within Botos cone crater and has an almost circular outline. It is around 7,540 years old, drains through Angel River, and surrounding forest is classified as tropical, subtropical and some páramo vegetation. There are around 23 algae species.

== Social and economic uses ==
As part of the Poás Volcano National Park, one of the most visited national parks in the country, this lake benefits the tourism industry. Access trails are paved and the viewpoint is easily accessed.

== Gallery ==
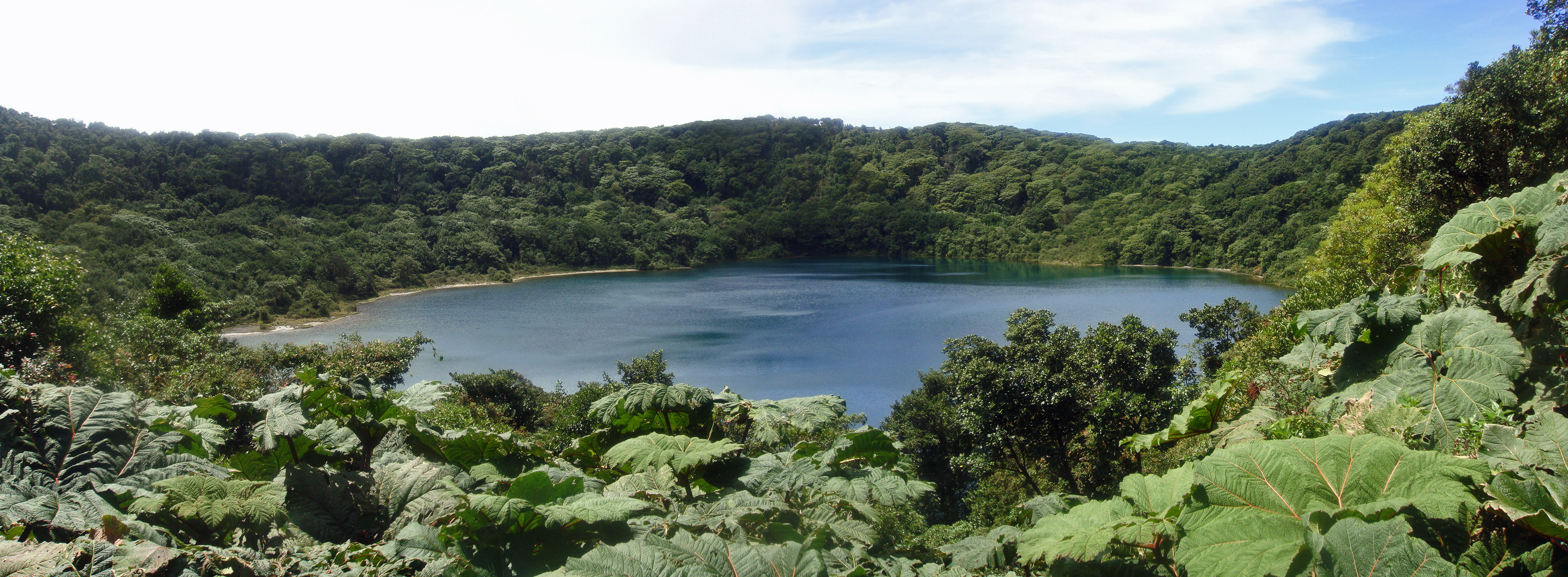
Lake Botos panorama as seen from the viewpoint trail

== See also ==
- List of lakes of Costa Rica
- List of volcanoes in Costa Rica
