= Juan Castro Blanco National Park =

Protected area in Costa Rica

- IUCN category II (national park)
- Juan Castro Blanco National Park
- Location: Costa Rica
- Nearest city: San José
- Coordinates: 10°18′0″N 84°21′58″W
- Area: 145 km^{2} (56 sq mi)
- Established: 22 April 1992
- Governing body: National System of Conservation Areas (SINAC)
- Location in Costa Rica

Parque Nacional Juan Castro Blanco (Juan Castro Blanco National Park) is a national park in the Arenal Huetar Norte Conservation Area in Alajuela Province in northern Costa Rica, about 100 kilometres (62 mi) north of San José It was established on 22 April 1992.

== History ==
Juan Castro Blanco Forest Reserve was created on 26 June 1975 with an area of about 13,700 hectares (34,000 acres). In 1989, it was designated a protected zone of 14,250 hectares (35,200 acres). On 22 April 1992, Decree No. 9279 made it a national park.

== Geography ==
Juan Castro Blanco National Park has an area of around 145 square kilometres (56 sq mi). It contains three volcanoes: Planatar, Porvenir and El Viejo.

The reserve contains the sources of the Aguas Zarcas, Platanar, Tora, Tres Amigos and La Vieja rivers, and is an important watershed for the surrounding communities. Lake Pozo Verde is also located within the park.

== Climate ==
The temperature generally ranges between 60 and 80°F (15 and 27°C). Annual rainfall averages 140 inches (3,600 mm).

== Flora and fauna ==
Half of the park consists of forests, including rainforests, with trees 30 metres (98 ft) high or higher. Cloud forests support an estimated 2000 plant species, including over 200 documented orchid species.

About 57 species of mammal are reported in the reserve and include: jaguars, tapirs, ocelots, sloths, howler monkeys, red brocket deer and at least 22 species of bats. Over 233 species of birds, resident and migratory have been recorded, including the national bird of Costa Rica: the clay-colored thrush. Around 64 threatened or endangered species are found in the park, including the great curassow and the red brocket deer. Over 44 amphibian species reside in the park.

== Visitor facilities ==
There is an extensive trail system that winds through the park. However, there are no other public facilities.
