= Border Corridor Wildlife Refuge =

- Refugio de Vida Silvestre Corredor Fronterizo
- Location: Costa Rica
- Coordinates: 11.0715°N 84.6818°W
- Area: 600.17 square kilometres (231.73 sq mi)
- Designation: V14
- Established: 15 February 1994
- Governing body: National System of Conservation Areas (SINAC)

Border Corridor Wildlife Refuge (Spanish: Refugio de Vida Silvestre Corredor Fronterizo) is a wildlife refuge, running through Guanacaste, Arenal Huetar Norte and Tortuguero Conservation Areas, in the northern part of Costa Rica running as a 2,000 metre wide strip of land along the border with Nicaragua.

It was created in 1994 by decree 22962-MIRENEM, and there are no public facilities specifically for this refuge. The refuge contains a number of research programs of varying disciplines.

This refuge is partially disturbed but includes beaches, dry forests, wetlands, moist forests and coastal lagoons.

== See also ==
- Korean Demilitarized Zone, for the efforts for a similar border corridor wildlife refuge.
