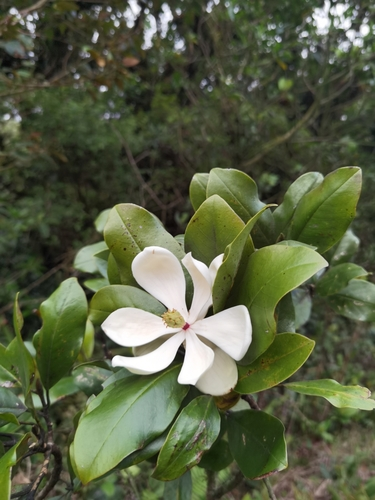

Conservation status
- Near Threatened (IUCN 3.1)

Scientific classification
- Kingdom: Plantae
- Clade: Embryophytes
- Clade: Tracheophytes
- Clade: Spermatophytes
- Clade: Angiosperms
- Clade: Magnoliids
- Order: Magnoliales
- Family: Magnoliaceae
- Genus: Magnolia
- Section: Magnolia sect. Magnolia
- Species: M. poasana

Binomial name
- Magnolia poasana (Pittier) Dandy

Synonyms
- Talauma poasana Pittier

= Magnolia poasana =

Species of tree

Magnolia poasana (known locally as the candelilla, or by the common name Poas magnolia) is a sub-tropical to tropical, subcanopy tree, growing in areas of montane rainforest. The names "Poas", and "poasana" originate from the Poás Volcano in Costa Rica where, along with Panama, they grow in the wild. First described by Henri François Pittier in 1910 (treated in the genus Talauma), it was later described and included in Magnolia by James Edgar Dandy (1927).

== Description ==
Magnolia poasana is between 10 and 30m in height, with a dbh of about 90 cm, and its growth habit is round and densely compact. It tends to be low branching, or tending to branch off from the base when in more open areas with greater sun exposure.

=== Leaves and bark ===
The glossy, glabrous leaves are 12 x 5 cm in length, simple, alternate, elliptic, entire, apiculate, acute and lanceolate with prominent stipules, a scar encircling each leaf's petiole. The bark is smooth, reddish brown with a gray cast.

=== Flowers ===
Flowers bloom from the months of November through July, peaking in February, March and April. They are bisexual, 10 cm in diameter, with 6 spatulate, white petals and 3 gray membranous sepals. A perianth is formed of a yellowish white corolla.

=== Fruit and seeds ===
The tree bears its fruit, which are aromatic, cone-like, aggregate infructescenses, about 4 cm in length, in July and August. There are approximately 25 fruits of dehiscing capsules per infructescense. The fruit's seeds are exserted, and covered with bright networks of arils which dangle from threads. Seed germination is epigean.

== Distribution and habitat ==
Mostly located in foothills of the Cordillera de Talamanca and Central, M. poasana has been documented as growing naturally as low as 500m, and as high as 2400m, but most trees have been found at elevations between 1300m to 2200m. All specimens of M. poasana prior to 1972 were collected from Costa Rica, but since then samples have been collected in Chiapas, Mexico; in 1982 samples were also collected in Panama. M. poasana is most often found growing in soils of alluvial or volcanic origin, in climates in which the temperature ranges between 4 and 25 degrees C; where the precipitation accumulates at rates of 2,000 to 3,000 mm per annum.

== Uses ==
The Poas magnolia has applications in construction and carving.

The wood is colored greenish-grey with an oven-dry specific weight of 0.38. It has fine texture and an attractive finish, is easy to work and turn, yet durable. It is used in general construction and as a component in plywood; to decorate interiors as panelling, veneers and finishing; in cabinetry and the manufacture of furniture.
