= Caribbean La Amistad Conservation Area =

Conservation area in Costa Rica

- Área de Conservación La Amistad Caribe
- Location of the area, labeled ACLAC in the east of the country.
- Location: Limón Province, Costa Rica
- Coordinates: 9.735031°N 83.128922°W
- Governing body: National System of Conservation Areas (SINAC)
- Website: Caribbean La Amistad Conservation Area

Caribbean La Amistad Conservation Area is an administrative area which is managed by SINAC for the purposes of conservation in the eastern part of Costa Rica, on the Caribbean coast. It contains several national parks, and a number wildlife refuges and other types of nature reserve.

== Protected areas ==
- Banano River Basin Protected Zone
- Barbilla National Park
- Bonilla-Bonillita Lacustrine Wetland
- Cahuita National Park
- Cariari National Wetlands
- Hitoy Cerere Biological Reserve
- Jairo Mora Sandoval Gandoca-Manzanillo Mixed Wildlife Refuge
- La Amistad International Park (shared with Panama and Pacific La Amistad Conservation Area)
- Limoncito Wildlife Refuge
- Pacuare-Matina Forest Reserve
- Pacuare River Forest Reserve
- Siquirres River Basin Protected Zone
