= Limoncito Wildlife Refuge =

Protected area in Costa Rica

- Refugio de Vida Silvestre Limoncito
- IUCN category IV (habitat/species management area)
- Location within Costa Rica
- Location: Costa Rica
- Coordinates: 9.953°N 83.029°W
- Area: 10.98 square kilometres (4.24 sq mi)
- Established: 26 April 1994
- Governing body: National System of Conservation Areas (SINAC)

Limoncito Wildlife Refuge (Spanish: Refugio de Vida Silvestre Limoncito), is a protected area in Costa Rica, managed under the Caribbean La Amistad Conservation Area, it was created in 1994 by decree 23141-MIRENEM.
