= Codo del Diablo murders =

Political crime in Costa Rica in 1948

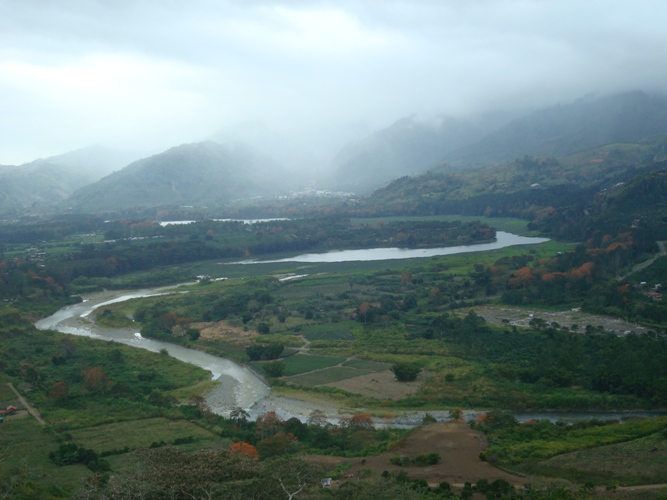
Reventazón River

The Codo del Diablo murders were murders that were carried out in Costa Rica on December 19, 1948, in the area of Siquirres, Limón Province, known as El Codo del Diablo ("Elbow of the Devil"). Six political prisoners were kidnapped and extrajudicially killed due to their political affiliation with communism. The victims were Federico Picado Sáenz, Tobías Vaglio Sardi, Lucio Ibarra, Octavio Sáenz Soto, Narciso Sotomayor, and Álvaro Aguilar (all Costa Ricans, except Sotomayor who was Nicaraguan), who were linked to the Communist Party Vanguardia Popular and were fighters of the "Caldero-comunista" side during the Costa Rican Civil War of 1948 that had ended eight months before. The assassins were associated with the winning side or "Figueristas" and the government was in the hands of the Founding Junta of the Second Republic, a de facto government. It is the last case in which the murder of Costa Rican citizens occurred due to their political ideas by persons linked to the State.

The perpetrators of the crime were Captain Manuel Zúñiga Jirón and Deputy Luis Norberto Valverde Quirós of the Public Force, and as a driver, the Cuban-born Clarencio Auld Alvarado.

The detainees were transferred from a police command in Limón in handcuffs to the Siquirres area on the banks of the Reventazón River, known as “Codo del Diablo”, where, aboard the train to the Atlantic of the Northern Railway Company, they were killed with a fire gun and their bodies were thrown into the river where it was thought that they would not be found. However, one of the bodies broke away from the handcuffs and separated from the rest, being found shortly after.

An arrest warrant, imprisonment, and trial against the culprits were issued. However, they escaped from justice abroad, as reported, with the help of contacts they had in the government.

On the anniversary of the event in 2012, José María Villalta, then deputy of the left-wing Broad Front Party (which proclaimed itself to be the historic successor of the Communist Party), recalled the fact in the plenary and accused the government of José Figueres Ferrer of having ordered the crime.
