= Cacho Negro Volcano =

Inactive volcano in Costa Rica

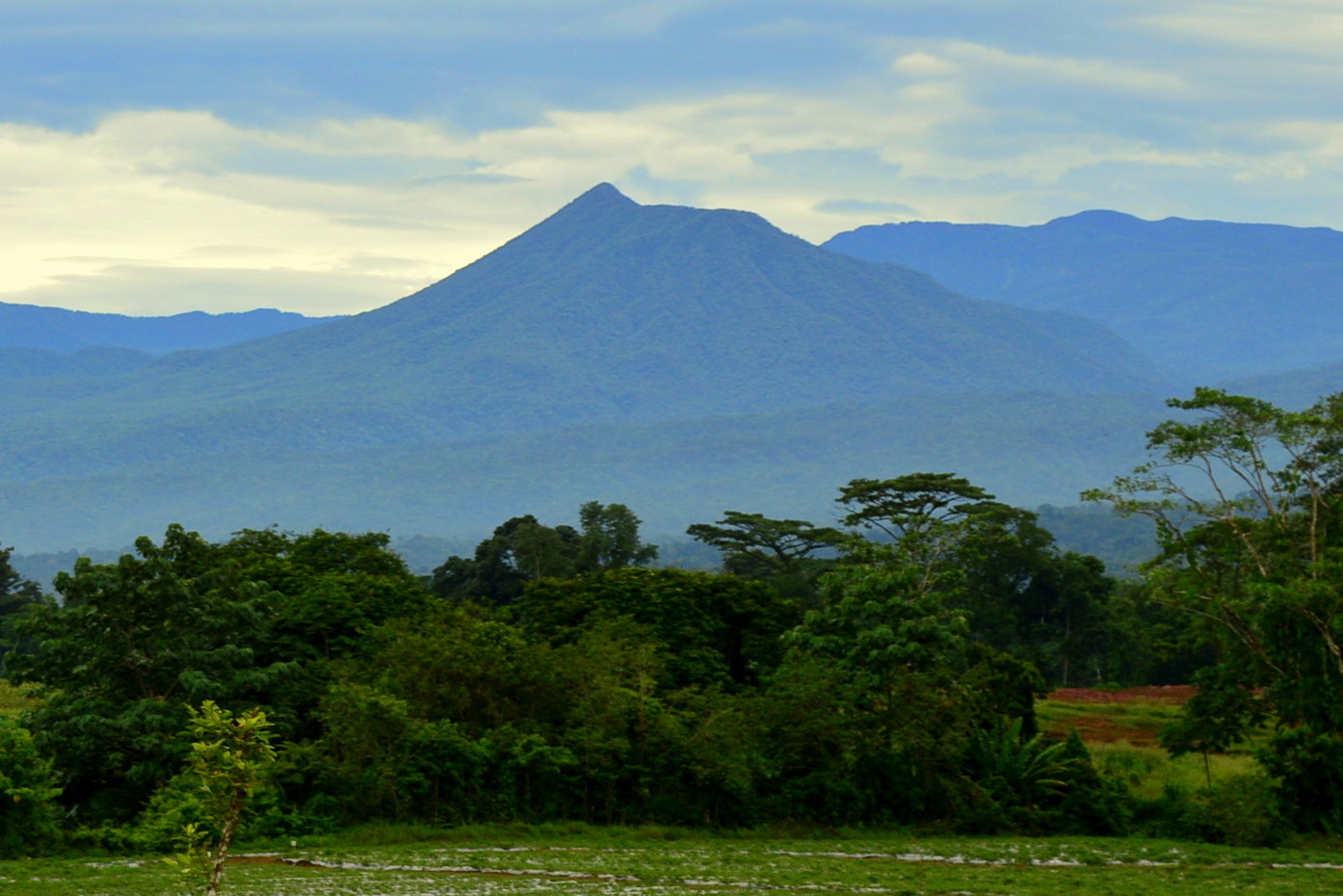
- View of Cacho Negro Volcano from Sarapiquí, Heredia

Highest point
- Elevation: 2,150 m (7,050 ft)
- Listing: List of volcanoes in Costa Rica
- Coordinates: 10°11′45″N 84°02′46″W

Geography
- Location within Costa Rica
- Location: Costa Rica
- Parent range: Cordillera Central

Geology
- Mountain type: Stratovolcano
- Volcanic arc: Central America Volcanic Arc
- Last eruption: More than 100 years ago.

The Cacho Negro Volcano, in Spanish the Volcán Cacho Negro, which translates as Black Horn Volcano, is an inactive volcano in Costa Rica, situated in the Cordillera Central range near the Barva Volcano and within the Braulio Carrillo National Park.

== Toponymy ==
Previously known as Arenales Volcano, the current name is due to similarity of the volcano's top to with a bovine horn.

== Physical aspects ==
It is located 9 kilometres (5.6 mi) north of Barva Volcano, and is part of its complex. The crater is open at the northwest side. There is a parasitic cone towards the south side. Its area is around 30 square kilometres (12 sq mi).

== Volcanic activity ==
There is secondary volcanic activity with hot springs, but due to the difficult access, their precise source hasn't been determined.
