= Banano River Basin Protected Zone =

Protected area in Costa Rica

- Zona Protectora Cuenca del Río Banano
- IUCN category VI (protected area with sustainable use of natural resources)
- Location within Costa Rica
- Location: Costa Rica
- Coordinates: 9.842°N 83.179°W
- Area: 91.87 square kilometres (35.47 sq mi)
- Established: 19 November 1990
- Governing body: National System of Conservation Areas (SINAC)

Banano River Basin Protected Zone (Spanish: Zona Protectora Cuenca del Río Banano), is a protected area in Costa Rica, managed under the Caribbean La Amistad Conservation Area, it was created in 1990 by decree 20043-MIRENEM.
