= Barbilla National Park =

National park in Costa Rica

- IUCN category II (national park)
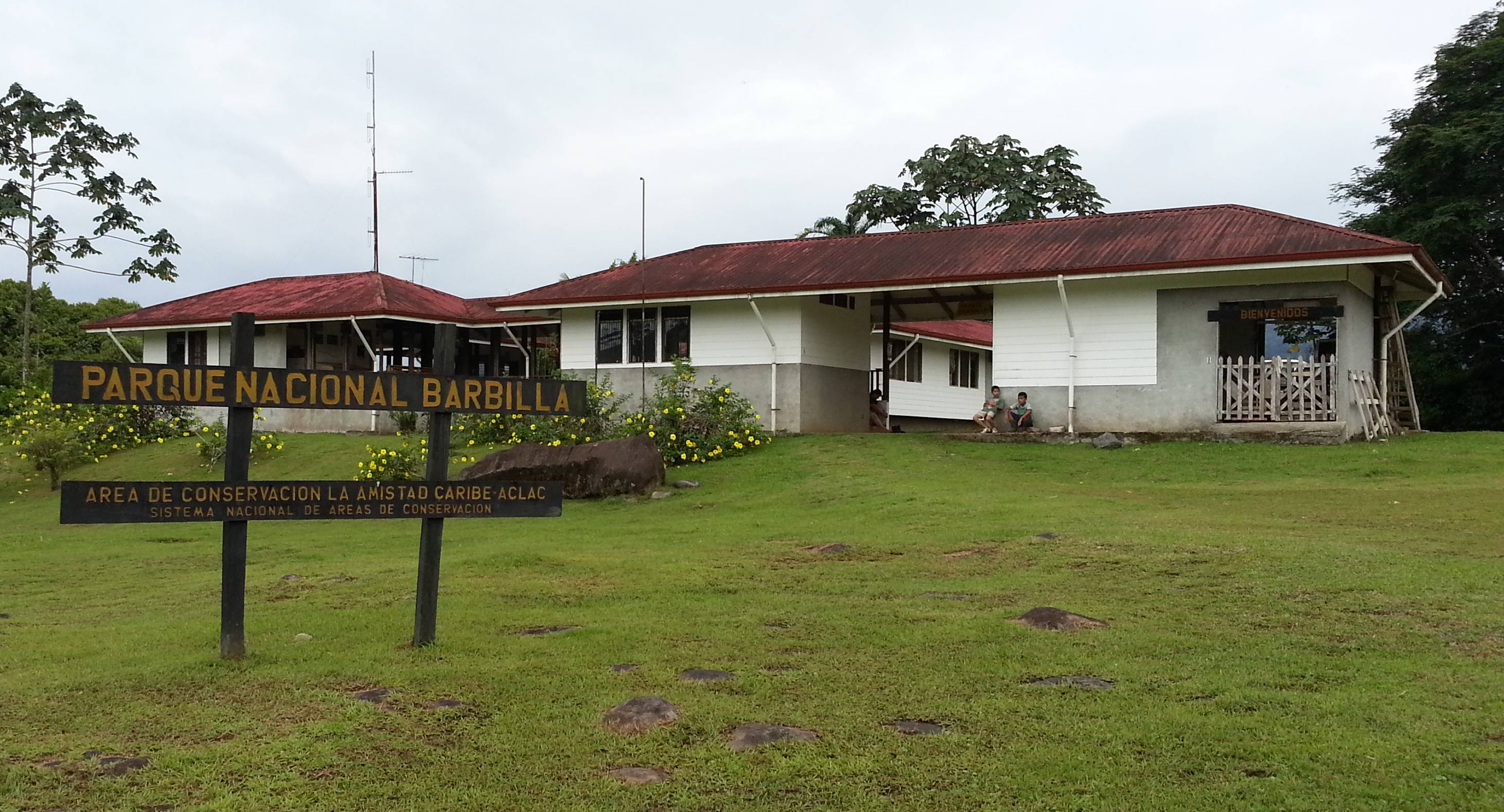
- The ranger station at Barbilla National Park.
- Barbilla National Park area.
- Location: Costa Rica
- Nearest city: Siquirres
- Coordinates: 9.942°N 83.42°W
- Area: 119 km^{2} (46 sq mi)
- Established: 1982
- Governing body: National System of Conservation Areas (SINAC)
- Location in Costa Rica

Barbilla National Park is a national park in the Caribbean La Amistad Conservation Area located on the eastern slopes of the Cordillera de Talamanca of Costa Rica. It was designated a biological preserve in 1982, then upgraded to a national park in 1998.

== Geography ==
The park consists of over 29,500 acres (11,938 ha) or more in both Cartago and Limón Provinces. With elevations ranging from 330 to 4,920 feet (100 to 1,500 m) and higher, the park has both lowland rainforests and cloud forests. The highest point is Cerro Tigre, at 1,167 metres (3,829 ft).

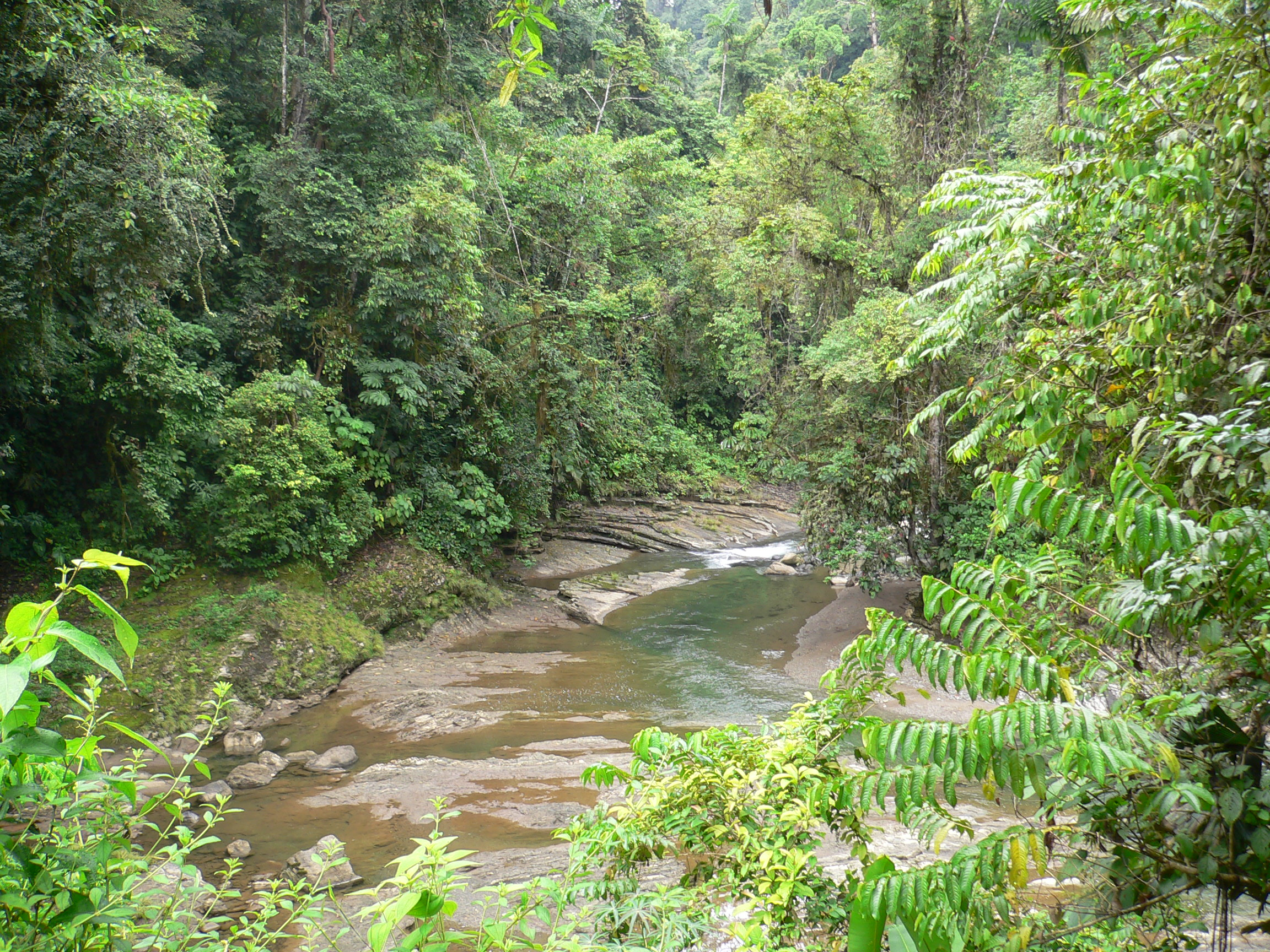
The Dantas River in Barbilla.

The watershed of the Rio Danta (Dantas River) is an important source of water for the people and animals. The Rio Barbilla is another major river in the park. Another water feature is Laguna Ayil.

== Ecology ==
It is home to over 350 bird species and 135 mammal species. Various species, including endangered ones, live within the park, including the jaguar, ocelot, puma, Baird's tapir (the country's largest land mammal), capuchin monkey, howler monkey, and two-toed sloth. Bird species include the sun heron, keel-billed toucan, harpy eagle and the critically endangered great green macaw. Other species include the eyelash viper, green basilisk (also known as the Jesus Christ lizard for its ability to run on water), and poison dart frog.

Plants include ferns, bromeliads, and orchids.

== Climate ==
Rainfall averages between 3,500–4,500 millimetres (140–180 in) per year. Temperatures range from 64 to 82 °F (18 to 28 °C).

== Indigenous residents ==
Barbilla National Park and the surrounding area are the home of the indigenous Cabécar people.

== Conservation ==
The park's isolated location has protected it to a great extent, but poaching and illegal logging still present dangers.

== Facilities ==
The park has the Barbilla Biological Station on site, as well as an administrative building located in Brisas de Pacuarito. Access is via an unpaved road, 17 km long starting about 3 kilometres (1.9 mi) from Siquirres.
