= Arenal Volcano Emergency Forest Reserve =

Forest reserve in Costa Rica

- IUCN category VI (protected area with sustainable use of natural resources)
- Location within Costa Rica
- Location: Alajuela, Costa Rica
- Coordinates: 10.4946°N 84.7168°W
- Area: 570 acres (2.3 km^{2})
- Established: 1972
- Governing body: National System of Conservation Areas (SINAC)

Arenal Volcano Emergency Forest Reserve is a Forest Reserve, part of the Arenal Huetar Norte Conservation Area, in the northern part of Costa Rica in the emergency zone of the Arenal Volcano. It was created in 1972 covering an area of forest, and there are no public facilities at the reserve.
