= Bosque Alegre Wildlife Refuge =

Wildlife Refuge in Costa Rica

- Location within Costa Rica
- Location: Costa Rica
- Nearest city: Río Cuarto, Alajuela
- Coordinates: 10.295278°N 84.208889°W
- Area: 8.40 square kilometres (2,080 acres)
- Designation: V10
- Established: 1994
- Governing body: National System of Conservation Areas (SINAC)

Bosque Alegre Wildlife Refuge (Spanish: Refugio de Vida Silvestre Bosque Alegre) is a protected area in Costa Rica, managed under the Central Conservation Area and created in 1994 under decree 22847-MIRENEM to protect the Lake Hule, Lake Congo and Lake Bosque Alegre, which together make up a lacustrine wetland with a great diversity of flora and fauna. It also protects an aquifer recharge zone for the Río Cuarto canton and surrounding populated centers.
