= Chopo Volcano =

Inactive volcano of Costa Rica

- Location within Costa Rica

Highest point
- Elevation: 402 metres (1,319 ft)
- Listing: List of volcanoes in Costa Rica
- Coordinates: 10°28′14″N 85°03′51″W

Geology
- Mountain type: Volcano
- Volcanic arc: Central America Volcanic Arc
- Last eruption: Unknown

Chopo Volcano, today a quarry, was an inactive volcano, also known as Anunciación, Coronación and Asunción mountain. It is located in Cañas canton of Guanacaste, 6 kilometres (3.7 mi) north of the Cañas city.

It is named after the nickname of the previous owner of the land where the volcano is located.

The area is of around 1 square kilometre (0.39 sq mi) and the cone is made of pyroclastic lava flows; its rocks are basaltic olivines.

Today the volcano is a quarry for road raw material. Cattle are raised in the surrounding areas.

== See also ==
- List of volcanoes in Costa Rica
