= Pacuare-Matina Forest Reserve =

Protected area in Costa Rica

- Reserva Forestal Pacuare-Matina
- IUCN category VI (protected area with sustainable use of natural resources)
- Location within Costa Rica
- Location: Costa Rica
- Coordinates: 10.180°N 83.251°W
- Area: 4.97 square kilometres (1.92 sq mi)
- Established: 23 March 1973
- Governing body: National System of Conservation Areas (SINAC)

Pacuare-Matina Forest Reserve (Spanish: Reserva Forestal Pacuare-Matina), is a protected area in Costa Rica, managed under the Caribbean La Amistad Conservation Area, it was created in 1973 by decree 2886-A.
