= Lake Río Cuarto =

- Location in Costa Rica
- Coordinates: 10.356944°N 84.216389°W
- Type: crater lake
- Surface area: 0.3150 km^{2} (0.1216 sq mi)
- Max. depth: 66 m (217 ft)
- Surface elevation: 380 m (1,250 ft)

Lake Río Cuarto (Spanish: Laguna Río Cuarto), is a fresh water crater lake located in the northern highlands of Costa Rica. It is the deepest natural lake in Costa Rica at 66-metre (217 ft).

== Location ==
It is located in Río Cuarto canton, of Alajuela province.

== Physical aspects ==
The lake Río Cuarto is a maar lake located within a crater, it has an almost circular outline. There is no secondary volcanic activity present.

== See also ==
- List of lakes in Costa Rica
