= Laguna Las Camelias Wildlife Refuge =

Las Camelias Lake Wildlife Refuge
- Refugio de Vida Silvestre Laguna Las Camelias
- IUCN category IV (habitat/species management area)
- Location within Costa Rica
- Location: Alajuela Province, Costa Rica
- Nearest city: Upala
- Coordinates: 10°57′46″N 85°06′05″W
- Area: 200 acres (0.81 km^{2})
- Established: 1994
- Governing body: National System of Conservation Areas (SINAC)

Las Camelias Lake Wildlife Refuge (Spanish: Refugio de Vida Silvestre Laguna Las Camelias), is a wildlife refuge that is part of the Arenal Huetar Norte Conservation Area, in the northern part of Costa Rica, near Upala in the Alajuela Province, close to the border with Nicaragua. It protects palustrine wetlands and forests which serve as a feeding and breeding ground for 240 species of birds, including the Muscovy duck and jabiru. It was created in 1994 by decree 22753-MIRENEM.
