= Lake Congo =

Lake in Costa Rica

- Location in Costa Rica
- Coordinates: 10.305262°N 84.216443°W
- Type: crater lake
- Surface area: 0.1490 km^{2} (0.0575 sq mi)
- Max. depth: 14.6 m (48 ft)
- Surface elevation: 740 m (2,430 ft)

Lake Congo (Spanish: Laguna Congo), is a fresh water crater lake located in the northern highlands of Costa Rica. It is part of a complex of lakes that also comprises Lake Hule and Lake Bosque Alegre. The three lakes are included in the Bosque Alegre Wildlife Refuge of the Costa Rica National Parks.

== Location ==
It is located in Los Ángeles Sur, of Río Cuarto canton, of Alajuela province.

== Physical aspects ==
Lake Congo is a maar lake located within a crater, sharing a geological depression with Lake Hule and Lake Congo. There is no secondary volcanic activity present. There is a low possibility of volcanic gas fumes.

== See also ==
- List of lakes in Costa Rica
