= Lake Hule =

Lake in Costa Rica

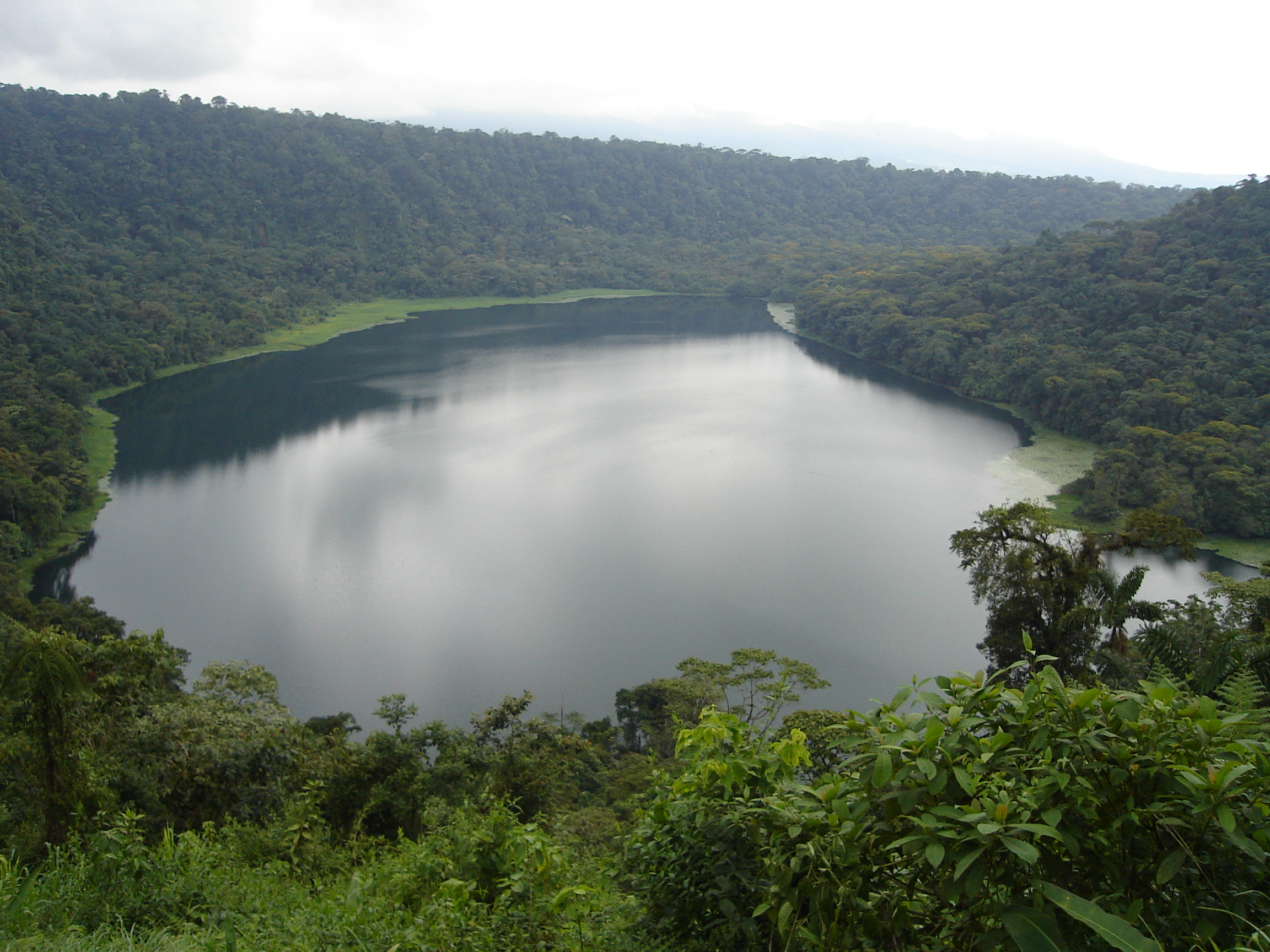

- Location in Costa Rica
- Coordinates: 10.295278°N 84.208889°W
- Type: crater lake
- Max. length: 1 km (0.62 mi)
- Surface area: 0.547 km^{2} (0.211 sq mi)
- Max. depth: 19.8 m (65 ft)
- Surface elevation: 740 m (2,430 ft)

Lake Hule (Spanish: Laguna de Hule), which translates to Lake of Rubber, due to the abundance of rubber trees nearby, is a fresh water crater lake located in the northern highlands of Costa Rica. It is part of a complex of lakes comprising Lake Hule, Lake Congo and Lake Bosque Alegre. The lakes are part of the Bosque Alegre Wildlife Refuge.

== Location ==
It is located in Los Ángeles Sur, of Río Cuarto canton, in Alajuela province.

== Physical aspects ==
Lake Hule is a maar lake located within a crater, with an almost circular outline. There is no secondary volcanic activity present.

It is filled by three small streams that drain the north slope of Congo Volcano

== See also ==
- List of lakes in Costa Rica
