= Platanar Volcano =

Mountain in Costa Rica

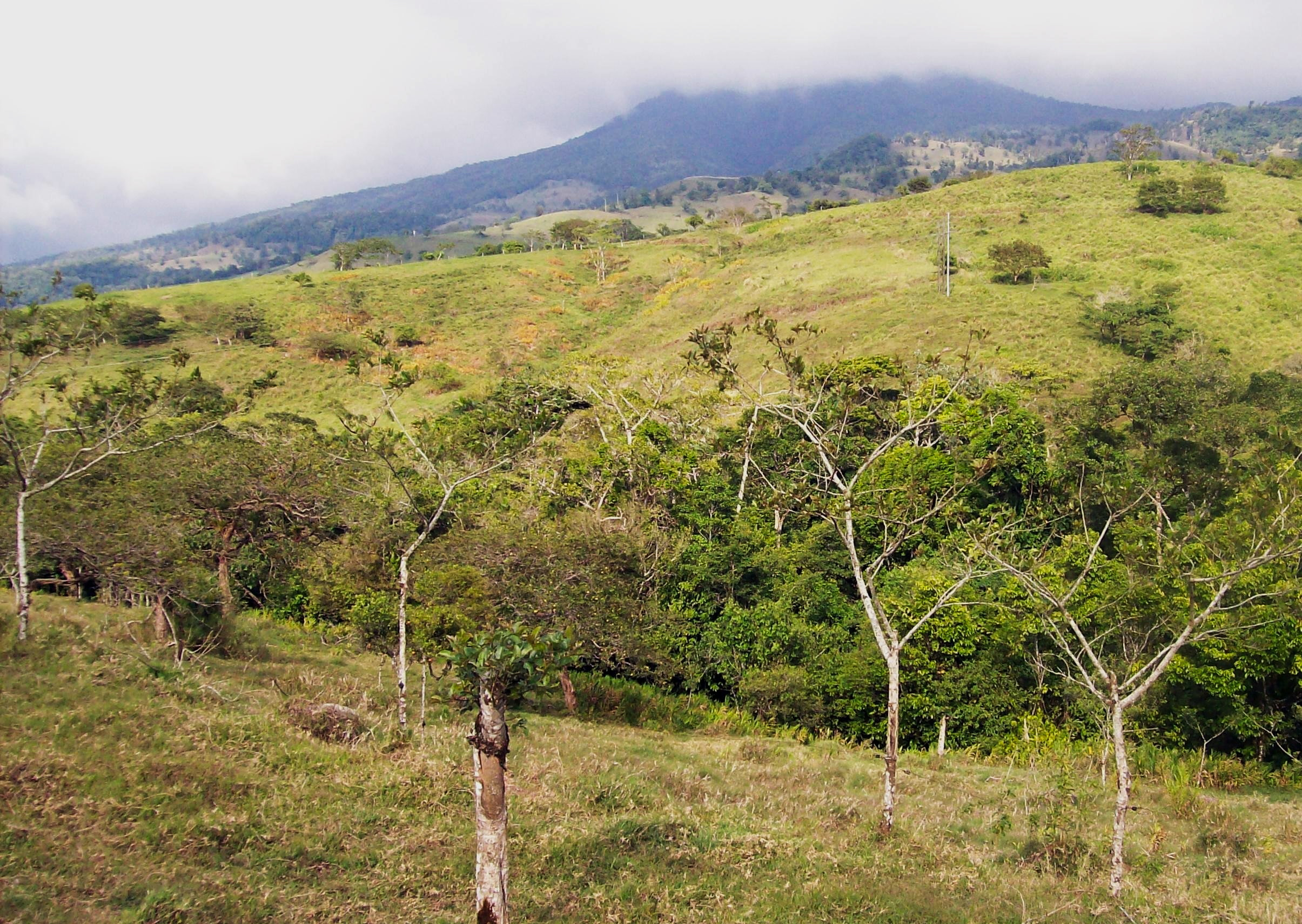

Highest point
- Elevation: 2,183 metres (7,162 ft)
- Coordinates: 10°18′00″N 84°21′58″W

Geography
- Location within Costa Rica

Geology
- Rock age: Holocene
- Mountain type: Volcano
- Volcanic arc: Central America Volcanic Arc
- Last eruption: Unknown

Platanar Volcano is a dormant stratovolcano located in the Cordillera Central mountain range. It is located within Juan Castro Blanco National Park. In 1968, 2,500 hectares (6,200 acres) on Cerro Platanar were converted into a national forest.

== Geology ==
Platanar sits on the north side of a complex that covers 900 square kilometres (350 sq mi) or approximately 386 square kilometres (149 sq mi), which it shares with Porvenir Volcano, another stratovolcano which also dates back to the Pleistocene or tentatively the Upper Pleistocene period. Both of these are part of a composed stratovolcano of that era. Platanar's summit rises to 7,162 feet (2,183 m), while Povenir's is a bit higher at 7,437 feet (2,267 m).

There is a destroyed crater on the northwestern part of Platanar's upper region, which features on its northeastern side Palmera's collapsed caldera, probably from the Lower Pleistocene and filled mostly with lahars.

Prehistoric lava flows adorn its western and northwestern flanks; one of them, the so-called Florida flow, was perhaps created by Platanar's most recent activity. Platanar's erupted lavas range from basalts to andesites in composition. On its southwest flank, there are "pyroclasts, detritus and volcanic breccias, as well as mixed breccias and alluvial deposits."

Stream-sediment samples taken in 1987 at the base of the northern flank of Platanar Volcano may indicate "epithermal gold deposits".

== Seismic activity ==
On 30 March 1997 there were six earthquakes, with an epicenter 5 kilometres (3.1 mi) southeast of the volcano, the strongest being of magnitude 2.7. A previous seismic swarm in April 1980 lasted for two to three weeks.

== Economic activities ==
The western flanks of both volcanoes are used for dairy farming.
