= Poás Volcano =

Volcano in Costa Rica

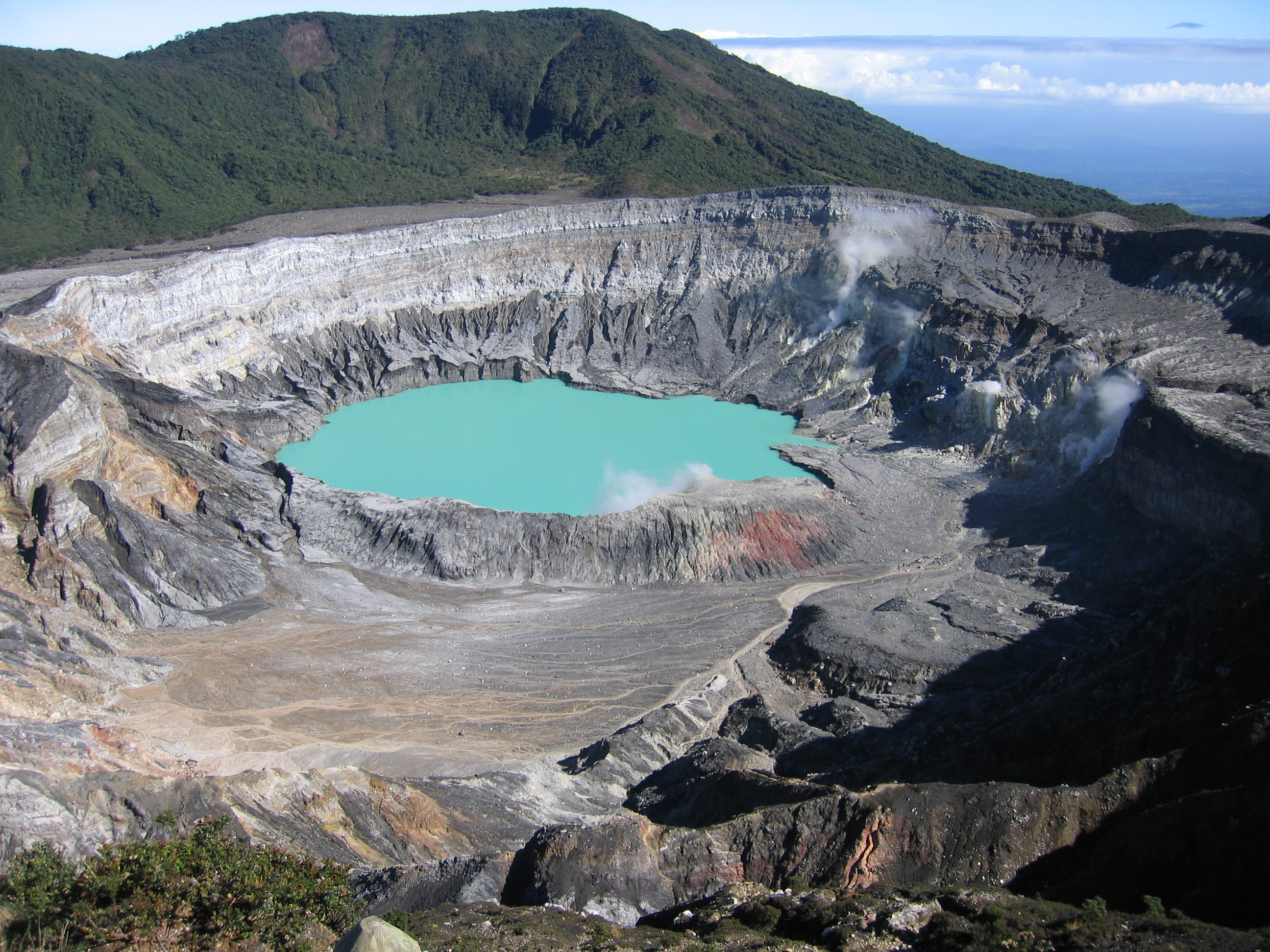
- Poás volcano crater, shown before the 2017 eruptions

Highest point
- Elevation: 2,697 m (8,848 ft)
- Coordinates: 10.2°N 84.233°W

Geography
- Location within Costa Rica
- Location: Costa Rica
- Parent range: Cordillera Central

Geology
- Mountain type: Stratovolcano
- Rock type(s): Andesite, Basalt, Basaltic Andesite, Picro-Basalt, Dacite
- Volcanic arc: Central America Volcanic Arc
- Last eruption: February 2026 (ongoing)

Climbing
- Easiest route: Hike

The Poás Volcano (Spanish: Volcán Poás), is an active 2,697-metre (8,848 ft) stratovolcano in central Costa Rica located within Poas Volcano National Park. It has erupted 40 times since 1828, with a strong eruption in April 2017—causing the evacuation of visitors and residents. The volcano and surrounding park were closed for nearly 17 months, with a 2.5 kilometer safety perimeter established around the erupting crater. On September 1, 2018, the park was reopened to the public only with limited access to the crater observation area. They have started to require a reservation on the National Park Website before visitation. Adjacent trails to Lake Botos, and the museum at the visitor center remained closed. The volcano erupted briefly twice in September 2019.

== Crater lakes ==
There are two crater lakes near the summit. The northern lake is known as the Laguna Caliente ("hot lagoon") and is located at a height of 2,300 m in a crater approximately 0.3 km wide and 30 m deep. It is one of the world's most acidic lakes. The acidity varies after rain and changes in volcanic activity, sometimes reaching a pH of almost 0. The bottom of this lake is covered with a layer of liquid sulfur. Acidity, lake temperature fluctuations, and a complex, toxic sulfur and iron chemistry (conjectured to be like conditions on early Earth and Mars) limits aquatic life to a specially-adapted Acidiphilium bacteria. Above ground, acid gases create acid rain and acid fog, causing damage to surrounding ecosystems and often irritation of eyes and lungs.

Lake Botos, the southern lake, fills an inactive crater, with the latest eruption in 7500 BC. It is cold and clear, and is surrounded by a cloud forest within the National Park boundaries.

== Activity ==
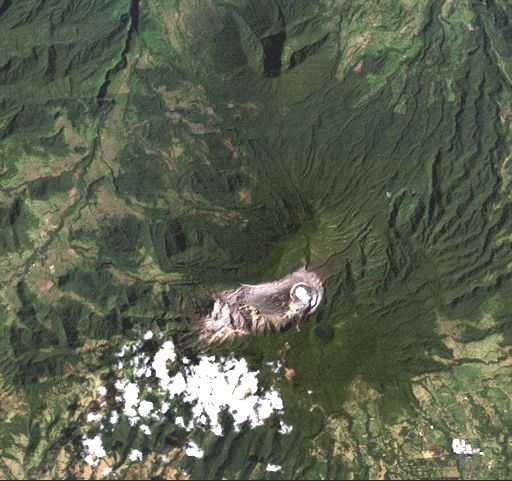
Space view showing the destroyed vegetation zone by hot and acid gases

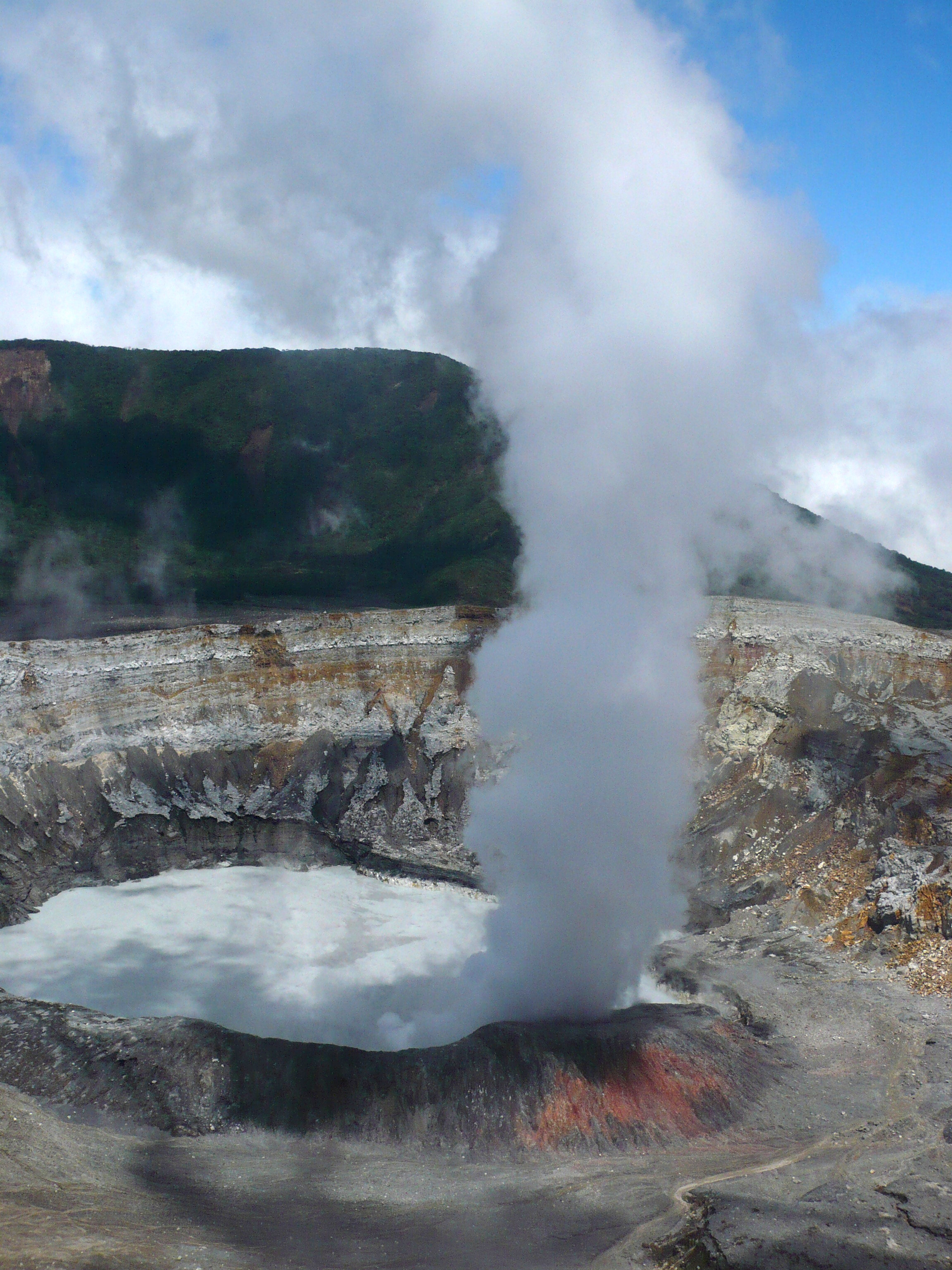
Steam rising from the main crater

On May 17, 1953, an eruption occurred that started a cycle and lasted until 1956. At least two people were reported missing in this incident.

Poás was near the epicenter of a 6.1-magnitude earthquake in January 2009 that killed at least forty people and affected Fraijanes, Vara Blanca, Cinchona (the most affected area), the capital San José, and the Central Valley region of Costa Rica.

There was also an eruptive activity in 2009 involving minor phreatic eruptions and landslides within the northern active crater. Poás eruptions often include geyser-like ejections of crater-lake water.

On February 25, 2014, a webcam from the Volcanological and Seismological Observatory of Costa Rica (OVSICORI) captured the moment a dark cloud exploded about 1,000 feet in the air from a massive crater of the Poás Volcano. This volcano remains active today. Poás is one of the 9 volcanoes currently monitored by the Deep Earth Carbon Degassing Project. The project is collecting data on the carbon dioxide and sulfur dioxide emission rates from subaerial volcanoes.

=== 2017 Activity ===
On April 9, 2017, National Park officials placed restrictions on visitors at Poas due to an increased volume of toxic gases at the summit crater. An explosion on April 12 caused the decision to close the park for visitors for a "temporary” time. Some nearby residents were also evacuated because of the activity.

On April 14, 2017, two eruptions at 07:39 and 07:57 created an over three kilometer ash and vapor column. Further explosions occurred after 2 days, on April 16.

Following a substantial blast on April 22, that sent incandescent rocks over a large area which damaged park buildings and infrastructure, Costa Rica President Luis Guillermo Solis toured the surrounding towns the following two days. Business owners described the negative financial impacts the volcano park closure were causing, and Solis released a video in Spanish and English urging potential tourists to visit the nearby community shops and restaurants. He also promised emergency agencies would continue to make updated reports on the eruption. As of September 1, 2018, the National Park has re-opened with limited access and revised regulations. Visitors are required to make an online reservation to enter the park and the number of visitors and time allowed at the crater is limited. Only the main crater observation area is open as of September 2018. As of April 2023, while some adjacent trails remain closed, the trail to the Lake Botos is open.

=== 2019 Activity ===
- February 11, 2019: According to the Volcanological and Seismological Observatory of Costa Rica (OVSICORI), the eruption began at 1:50 a.m. Monday and sent a column of ash 200 meters above the crater.
- September 30, 2019, 05:41: Eruption of ash and solid material, with a 2 kilometer column, in contrast of previous water vapor activities on September 23, 2019.
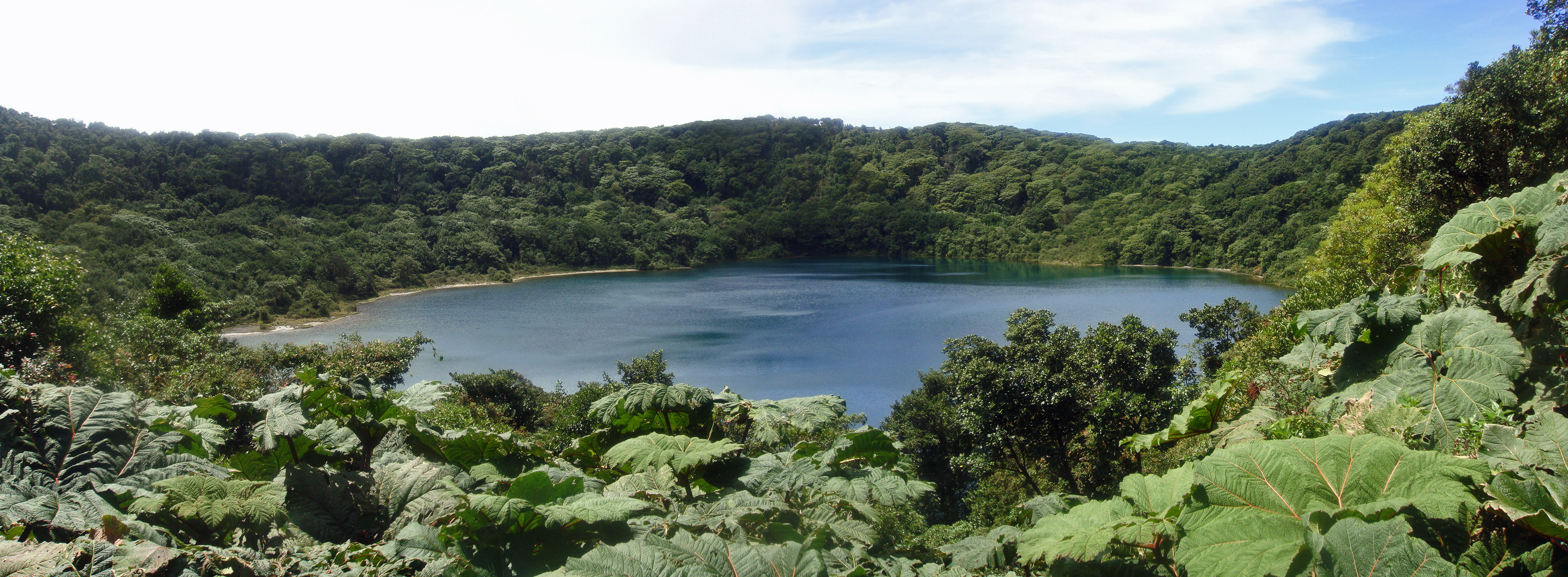
Lake Botos is an inactive crater within Poás Volcano National Park

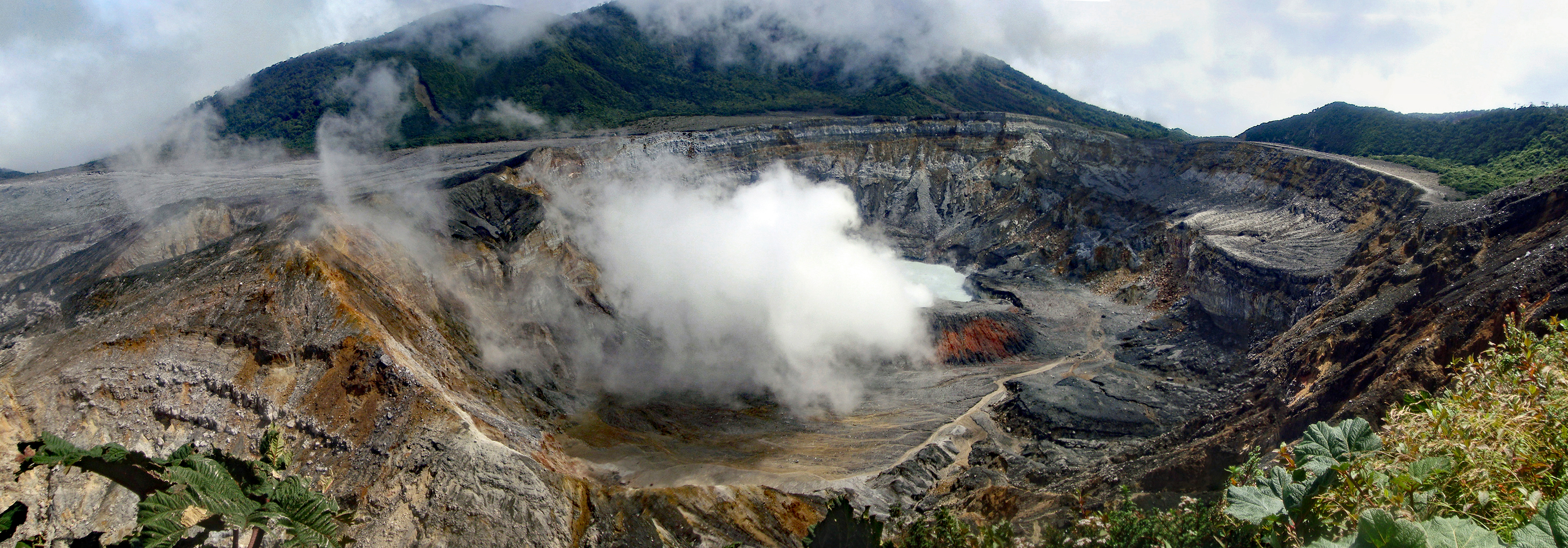
Fumarole activity at the Poás crater

=== IUGS geological heritage site ===
In respect of it being 'an iconic and type example of an arc shield-like massive stratovolcano and type example of an active crater lake complex', the International Union of Geological Sciences (IUGS) included 'The Poás volcano' in its assemblage of 100 'geological heritage sites' around the world in a listing published in October 2022. The organisation defines an IUGS Geological Heritage Site as 'a key place with geological elements and/or processes of international scientific relevance, used as a reference, and/or with a substantial contribution to the development of geological sciences through history.'

=== 2025 Activity ===
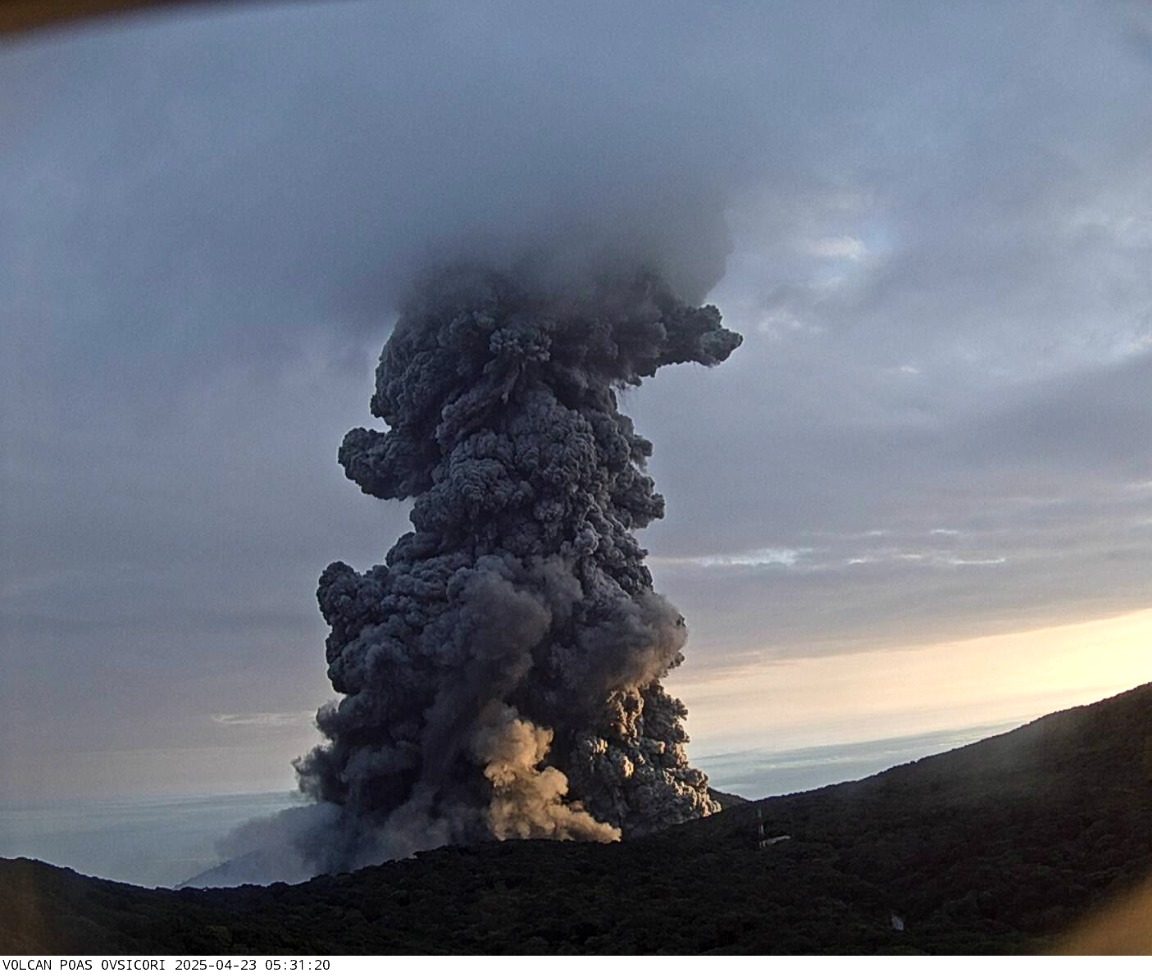
Pyroclastic column caused by an eruption of the Poás volcano on April 23, 2025.

Since the beginning of 2025, OVSICORI officials have been on alert as Poás has been producing small scale eruptions. The activity then increased at the beginning of March, when a volcanic plume of 400 meters was recorded by park officials and vulcanologists from OVSICORI. The alert level of the park was then elevated to level 3, which caused a temporary closure of the national park. The park would reopen on March 11th, although with enhanced safety protocols in place for visitors, such as limiting the visitor capacity to 56 people, decreased duration of stays, closure of hiking trails, and required helmets for visitors going to the crater viewpoint.

The volcano would maintain its activity through March, with increase of high-frequency earthquakes recorded, with over 200 events in a span of 24 hours on March 18th. The sulfur dioxide output of the volcano also rose to 691 tons per day on the same day, a sharp increase from earlier on March. The volcano's hyperacidic lake was also reported to be shrinking rapidly.

On March 28th, it was reported that Poás produced an ash column 234 meters tall, which was then followed by another column that rose 200 meters above the crater. According officials from OVSICORI, the volcano has launched projectiles over 150 meters into the air. This increase of activity has caused officials from the Ministry of Environment and Energy (MINAE) and the National System of Conservation Areas (SINAC) to announce an indefinite closure of the national park, after it was recommended by the National Emergency Commission (CNE) to do so.

On April 21st, it was reported that Poás produced an ash column 4 kilometers tall, the tallest since 2017. The wind provoked the ashfall to move southwest, affecting cantons like Sarchí and Grecia. The eruption could be seen from San José and Alajuela. More activity was reported on following days, where it threw hundreds of rocks up to 300 °C.

== See also ==
- List of volcanoes in Costa Rica
- Ark Herb Farm

== Referensec ==
- Volcano World: Poas, Costa Rica
