= Barva Volcano =

Stratovolcano in Costa Rica

- Las Tres Marías
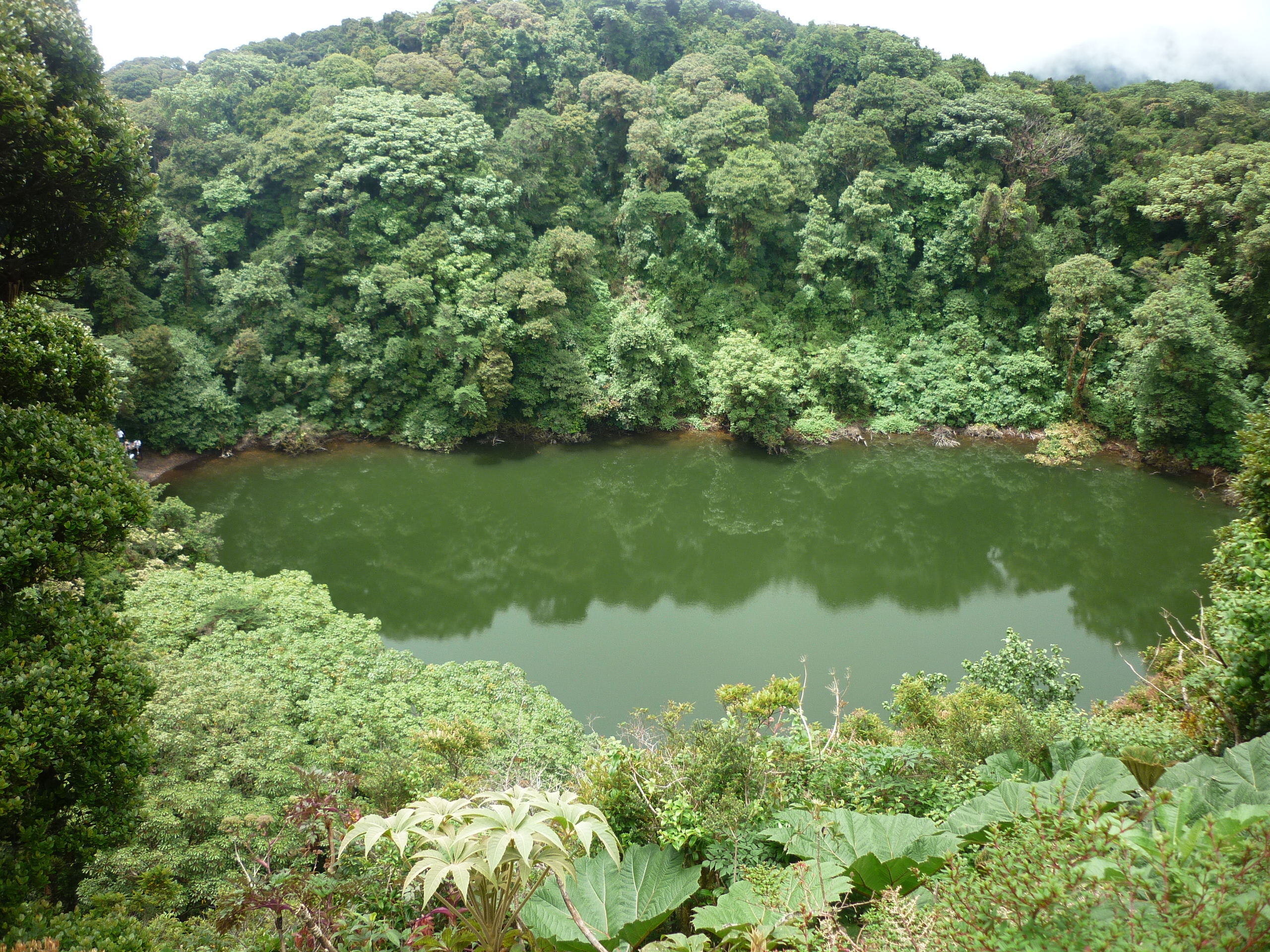
- Barva Lagoon, one of the crater lakes of the volcano

Highest point
- Elevation: 2,906 m (9,534 ft)
- Coordinates: 10°08′06″N 84°06′00″W

Geography
- Location within Costa Rica
- Location: Heredia, Costa Rica
- Parent range: Cordillera Central

Geology
- Mountain type: Complex volcano
- Volcanic arc: Central America Volcanic Arc
- Last eruption: 6050 BCE ± 1000 years

Climbing
- Easiest route: Hike

Barva Volcano is an andesitic stratovolcano complex in central Costa Rica, 22 kilometres (14 mi) north of San José, in Heredia Province. It is the highest point in Braulio Carrillo National Park at 9,534 feet (2,906 m). One source states that it is the largest volcano in Central America by area and volume, being about 40 kilometres (25 mi) in diameter.

== Geology ==
The volcano rests on the Panama tectonic microplate.

It has multiple peaks, with the three principal summits visible from the Central Valley given the name "Las Tres Marías" ("The Three Marys") by the locals. There is a 2-by-3-kilometre (1.2 by 1.9 mi) crater and "at least a dozen eruptive centers on its summit and several satellite cones on its northern and southern flanks." The central and northwestern summits are made up of four cones, while the southwestern peak has at least four. It has a slope angle of around 20°.

One of the main craters has a lake called Laguna de Barva (Barva Lagoon) at an altitude of 8,228 feet (2,508 m), an area of 9,000 square metres (97,000 sq ft), a depth of around 7.7 metres (25 ft) and spanning 70 metres (230 ft). To its north, there is another volcanic crater lake, Lake Danta, spanning 500 metres (1,600 ft), at around the same altitude.

There are lava flows on the southern side of the volcano, with the latest, the Los Angeles flow originating from the Cerro Redondo cone, almost reaching the city of Heredia. The lava consists of andesites, olivine basalts, and dacites.

Cacho Negro Volcano is part of the Barva Volcano complex.

The last confirmed eruptive activity at Barva Volcano has been dated to 6,050 ± 1000 years ago. There were reports of eruptions in the 1760s and in 1867, but investigations at the summit did not find evidence to confirm the reports.
