= Reventazón Dam =

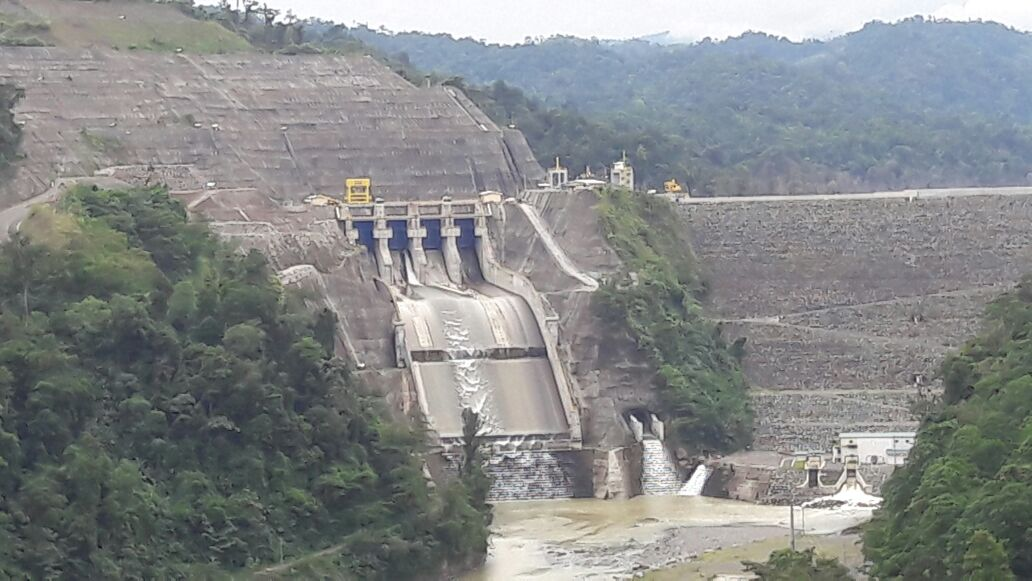

- Location within Costa Rica
- Country: Costa Rica
- Location: Siquirres, Limón Province,
- Coordinates: 10°3′56.05″N 83°34′48.79″W
- Purpose: Power
- Construction began: 2009
- Opening date: 16 September 2016
- Owner: Instituto Costarricense de Electricidad (ICE)

Dam and spillways
- Type of dam: Embankment, concrete-face rock-fill
- Impounds: Reventazón River
- Height: 130 m (430 ft)
- Length: 527 m (1,729 ft)
- Dam volume: 9,000,000 m^{3} (12,000,000 cu yd)

Reservoir
- Total capacity: 118,000,000 m^{3} (96,000 acre⋅ft)
- Surface area: 7 km^{2} (2.7 mi^{2})
- Maximum length: 8 km (5.0 mi)

Reventazón Hydropower Plant
- Coordinates: 10°4′59.82″N 83°33′40.95″W
- Commission date: 2016
- Type: Conventional, diversion
- Turbines: 4 × 74 MW Francis-type
- Installed capacity: 305.5 MW

The Reventazón Dam is a concrete-face rock-fill dam on the Reventazón River about 8 km (5.0 mi) southwest of Siquirres in Limón Province, Costa Rica. It was inaugurated on 16 September 2016, and its primary purpose is the production of hydroelectric power. The US$1.4 billion project and largest power station in the country has an installed capacity of 305.5 MW and is expected to provide power for 525,000 homes. Construction on the dam began in 2009. At a height of 130 metres (430 ft) and with a structural volume of 9,000,000 m^{3} (12,000,000 cu yd), it is the largest dam in Central America. To produce electricity, water from the reservoir is diverted about 3 km (1.9 mi) to the northeast where it reaches the power station along the Reventazón River. Due to its environmental features, like offset habitats and migration corridors for jaguars and many other species, the project could be a model for other future hydroelectric power plants.

== See also ==
- List of power stations in Costa Rica
