= Reventazón River =

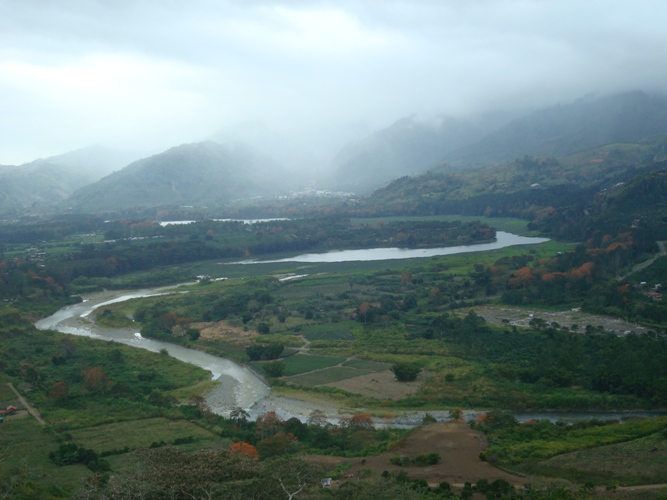

- Location within Costa Rica
- Etymology: severely broken up river
- Native name: Río Reventazón (Spanish)

Location
- Countries: Costa Rica
- Provinces: Cartago, Limón

Physical characteristics
- Source: Confluence of Agua Caliente River and Grande de Orosi River
  - coordinates: 9°48′42″N 83°51′04″W
- Mouth: Parismina River
  - coordinates: 10°17′07″N 83°24′39″W
- Length: 145 kilometres (90 mi)

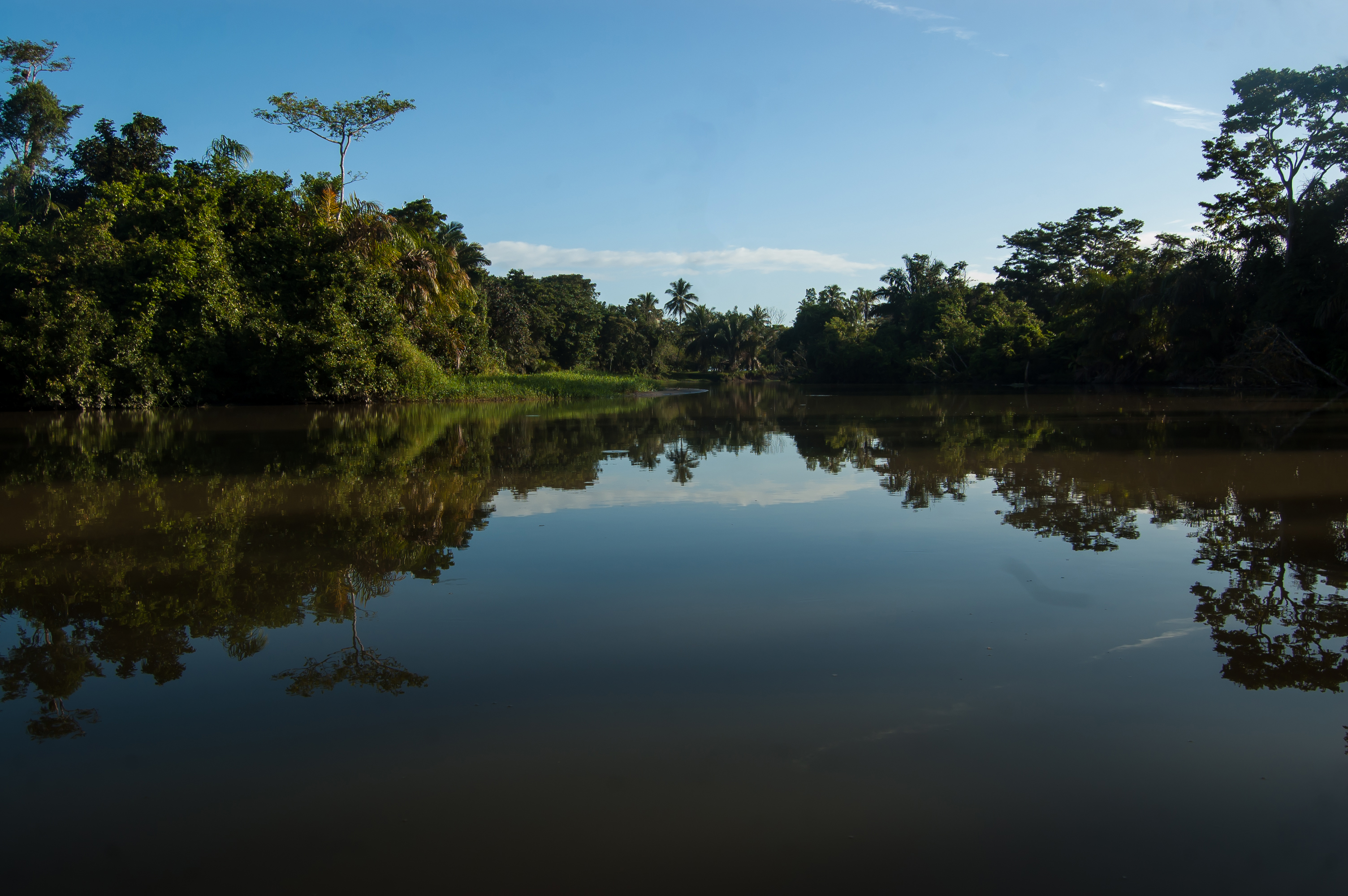
Reventazón River near Parismina

The Reventazón River, Rio Reventazón, is a river in Costa Rica.

== Geography ==
The Reventazón River forms part of the Reventazón-Parismina drainage basin. It is 145 kilometres (90 mi) long and flows into the Caribbean Sea. It starts at the base of the Irazú Volcano, passing through the east side of the Central Valley, and flows through the Orosí and Turrialba Valleys. After reaching the Caribbean coastal plains, it joins the Parismina River and forms what is called the Reventazón-Parismina.

== Economy ==
=== Water supply ===
In its upper segments, the Reventazón River is the source of 25% of the drinking water of Costa Rica's largest metropolitan area, centered on San Jose.

=== Hydropower generation ===
The river is very important for power generation. Three reservoirs in the river, Lake Cachí (100.8 MW), Angostura (177MW), and Reventazón Dam (305.5MW), are used for generating a significant share of Costa Rica's electricity. The dam for the third reservoir, Reventazón (305MW), was completed and opened in 2016. The river is also important for tourism, especially for whitewater rafting.

=== Tourism ===
Rafting is practiced on the river, which has Class 2-3 rapids in its Florida section.

== Ecosystem ==
The bobo mullet (Joturus pichardi) is native to the Parismina River and is fished here for subsistence consumption and sometimes commercially.

== See also ==
- Codo del Diablo murders
