= List of national parks of Costa Rica =

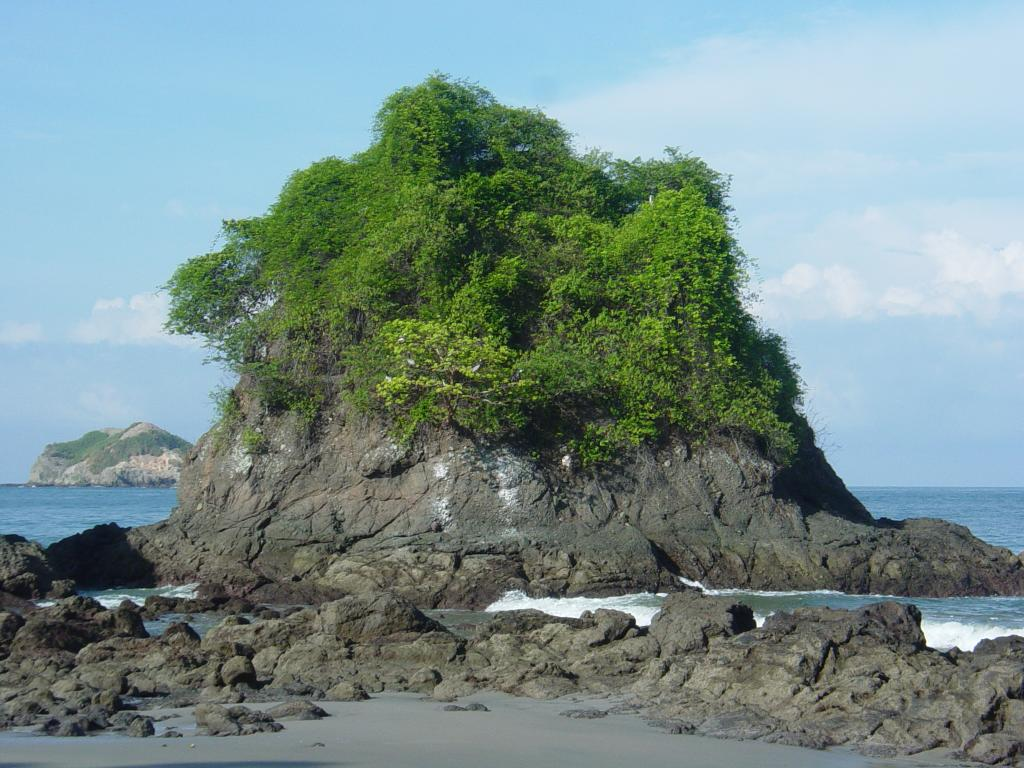
National Parks of Costa Rica
Manuel Antonio National Park
First Park	Poás Volcano National Park, 1955
Smallest Park	San Lucas Island National Park, 4.49 km^{2}
Largest Park	La Amistad International Park, 1991 km^{2}
Governing body	SINAC

In 2023, thirty National Parks of Costa Rica are managed under the umbrella of SINAC (Sistema Nacional de Areas de Conservacion), a department of Costa Rica's Ministry of Environment and Energy (MINAE). All told, Costa Rica's protected areas, including national parks, encompass more than 25% of the country's total land area. Many of these protected areas are national parks.

Costa Rica's progressive policies on environmental protection and sustainable ecotourism in the National Parks System have been lauded as a model for other countries. The rainforests, tropical forests, marine areas and wetlands of Costa Rica are the subject of many university and scientific organization studies. The enrichment of the world's knowledge of these important habitats is an invaluable contribution from the National Parks System of Costa Rica.

The Cordillera de Talamanca is home to an impressive collection of national parks and other preserved areas, including the La Amistad International Park, which extends into Panama. On the southern Osa Peninsula is the internationally renowned Corcovado National Park, which preserves a remnant of sizeable lowland tropical rainforest that is unique in the world. Manuel Antonio National Park was listed by Forbes in 2011 among the world's 12 most beautiful national parks.

The Camino de Costa Rica is a 280 km long hiking trail across Costa Rica. It runs from the Atlantic Ocean (Caribbean coast), the southernmost part of the Tortuguero Canals, up the mountain and through indigenous territory near the Barbilla National Park and through valleys and mountain ranges of the central region of the country, just south of the Turrialba and Irazu Volcanos and through the Los Santos coffee region down to the Pacific coast in Quepos.

== National parks of Costa Rica ==
Park	Coordinates	Area	Attractions
Arenal Volcano	10.46°N 84.70°W	12,124 ha (29,960 acres)	Arenal Volcano, 1,633 m (5,358 ft) in elevation, has been active almost continuously since 1968. A second volcano, Chato, has a lake in the crater.
Ballena Marine	9.16°N 83.75°W	5,330 ha (13,200 acres)	Located on the Pacific Ocean. 5,160 ha (12,800 acres) of park is water with seasonal visits by humpback whales, dolphins, and other marine life.
Barbilla	9.98°N 83.45°W	11,955 ha (29,540 acres)	Elevations from 110 m (360 ft) to 1,600 m (5,200 ft), The park features foot travel in wet and very wet rain forests and pumas, jaguars, ocelots, and tapirs.
Barra Honda	10.18°N 85.37°W	2,295 ha (5,670 acres)	The park features extensive limestone caves, some unexplored, with stalactite and stalagmite formations.
Braulio Carrillo	10.21°N 84.02°W	50,000 ha (120,000 acres)	Steep topography, several volcanoes, rain forests, and proximity to the capital city of San José are attractions. The highest elevation is 2,906 m (9,534 ft)
Cahuita	9.74°N 92.84°W	57,932 ha (143,150 acres)	On the Atlantic coast, 55,200 ha (136,000 acres) of the park is water. The park includes Costa Rica's largest coral reef and preserves marine life.
Carara	9.78°N 84.61°W	5,800 ha (14,000 acres)	Near the Pacific Ocean, Carara is the northernmost coastal rain forest in Costa Rica. The park is popular with bird watchers and has a large population of scarlet macaws.
Chirripó	9.73°N 84.61°W	50,150 ha (123,900 acres)	Chirripó features Costa Rica's highest mountain with an elevation of 3,820 m (12,530 ft). Alpine tundra (Costa Rican Paramo) and glacial lakes are found at elevations above 3,000 m (9,800 ft)
Cocos Island	5.53°N 87.06°W	2,310 ha (5,700 acres)	A UNESCO World Heritage Site, Cocos Island is 550 km (340 miles) off the Pacific Ocean coast of Costa Rica and features marine life, evergreen forests, and waterfalls.
Corcovado	8.54°N 83.57°W	41,788 ha (103,260 acres)	On the Pacific coast, most of the park is shallow lagoons, mangrove forests, beaches, and low altitude cloud forests. Access is only with approved guide.
Diriá	10.16°N 85.58°W	5,429 ha (13,420 acres)	The park features wetlands and forests.
Guanacaste	10.96°N 85.51°W	33,796 ha (83,510 acres)	Part of the Guancaste World Heritage Site, the park has two volcanos, Orosi and Cacao; dry, wet, and cloud forests; and a large population of collared peccary. Access is through Santa Rosa National Park.
Irazú Volcano	9.98°N 63.895°W	2,000 ha (4,900 acres)	Irazú is Costa Rica's highest volcano at 3,432 m (11,260 ft). A paved road reaches to near the summit from where both the Atlantic and Pacific coasts can be seen.
Juan Castro Blanco	10.48°N 84.33°W	14,308 ha (35,360 acres)	The mountainous park has volcanoic cones and vents, Lake Pozo Verde, waterfalls, and many bird species, including quetzals.
La Amistad	9.42°N 82.98°W	199,147 ha (492,100 acres)	A UNESCO World Heritage Site and the largest wilderness area in Costa Rica, the park extends into Panama. Rugged terrain and some of the highest mountains in the country are features. Bio-diversity is outstanding for both flora and fauna.
La Cangreja	0.70°N 84.40°W	2,570 ha (6,400 acres)	Forty-four species of plants are endemic to Costa Rica and crystalline water from the sources of two rivers.
Las Baulas	10.33°N 85.85°W	90,100 ha (223,000 acres)	Most of this park is ocean. The beaches of Las Baulas are the largest nesting ground in the world for sea turtles. The coastal area of the park features mangrove forests.
Los Quetzales	9.61°N 83.82°W	4,117 ha (10,170 acres)	A mountainous park reaching an elevation of 3,190 m (10,470 ft). As the name indicates the quetzal bird is the main attraction.
Manuel Antonio	9.39°N 84.14°W	27,587 ha (68,170 acres)	One of the few remaining homes of the Grey-crowned Central American squirrel monkey, an endangered species. Most of the park is ocean. Twelve islands shelter marine birds.
Miravelles Jorge Manuel Dengo	10.75°N 95.15°W	4,300 ha (11,000 acres)	The Miravalles Volcano rises to 2,028 m (6,654 ft). The Miravalles Geothermal Power Project is on the slopes of the volcano.
Palo Verde	10.38°N 85.33°W	18,332 ha (45,300 acres)	Declared a wetland of international importance, about one-half of the park is water or wetland, hosting migratory and non-migratory aquatic birds.
Piedras Blancas	8.71°N 83.27°W	15,350 ha (37,900 acres)	Rich as it is in biological life, Piedras Blancas is also part of the Osa Conservation Area along with several adjoining parks and reserves devoted to conservation.
Poás Volcano	10.20°N 84.23°W	6,506 ha (16,080 acres)	The volcano, 2,708 m (8,885 ft) in elevation, has several fumaroles emitting gas and causing acid rain which has killed much of the vegetation and force frequent closure of the park.
Rincón de la Vieja Volcano	10.77°N 85.34°W	14,127 ha (34,910 acres)	The volcano, 1,916 m (6,286 ft) in elevation is continuously active with foot trails to nine volcanic cones, fumaroles, mud pits, and hot springs.
Santa Rosa	10.84°N 85.71°W	39,322 ha (97,170 acres)	Santa Rosa protects a dry tropical forest and beaches with sea turtle nests. The park is the site of the Battle of Santa Rosa and military monuments.
San Lucas Island	9.94°N 84.91°W	472 ha (1,170 acres)	Located 2 km (1.2 miles) off shore in the Pacific Ocean, the park is a former prison and wildlife preserve.
Tapantí-Macizo de la Muerte	9.76°N 83.78°W	58,495 ha (144,540 acres)	Elevations up to 2,560 m (8,400 ft), rain forests, ancient oak and alder trees characterize this park in one of the rainiest parts of Costa Rica. Precipitation exceeds 6,500 mm (260 in) annually.
Tenorio Volcano	10.71°N 84.99°W	12,905 ha (31,890 acres)	The park is characterized by cloud forests and rain forests. The volcano reaches an elevation of 1,917 m (6,289 ft).
Tortuguero	10.45°N 83.57°W	76,397 ha (188,780 acres)	Two-thirds of the park is water. The park hosts the largest green turtle nesting beach in the Americas. Ninety-nine percent of the park is for preservation; one percent is open to visitors.
Turrialba Volcano	10.02°N 83.77°W	1,257 ha (3,110 acres)	Turrialba is the second highest volcano in Costa Rica with an elevation of 3,340 m (10,960 ft). The volcano is periodically active.
Total		816,521 ha (2,017,670 acres) (including ocean)	The land area of national parks make up 13 percent of the area of Costa Rica and about one-half of the total protected land area in Costa Rica.

== Number of visitors to parks ==
Rank	Park	Total visitors (2012–2022)
1	Manuel Antonio	4,388,469
2	Irazú Volcano	2,732,394
3	Poás Volcano	2,503,944
4	Marino Ballena	1,878,848
5	Tortuguero	1,277,816
6	Cahuita	1,113,911
7	Arenal Volcano	1,010, 866
8	Tenoro Volcano	975,754
9	Rincón de La Vieja Volcano	769,719
10	Corcovado	551,101
11	Santa Rosa	425,388
12	Carara	398,910
13	Tapanti-Macizo de la Muerte	240,482
14	Braulio Carrillo	240,089
15	Chirripó	155,696
16	Coco Island	107,295
17	Palo Verde	68,591
18	Barra Honda	52,067
19	Los Quetzales	28,751
20	San Lucas Island	18,872
21	Marino Las Baulas	18,012
22	Diriá	16,300
23	La Cangreja	12,556
24	La Amistad International Park	7,985
25	Turrialba Volcano	7,234
26	Barbilla	4,157
27	Piedras Blancas	3,727
28	Juan Castro Blanco	732
29	Guancaste	n/a
30	Miravalles Jorge Manuel Dengo	n/a

== Photographs ==
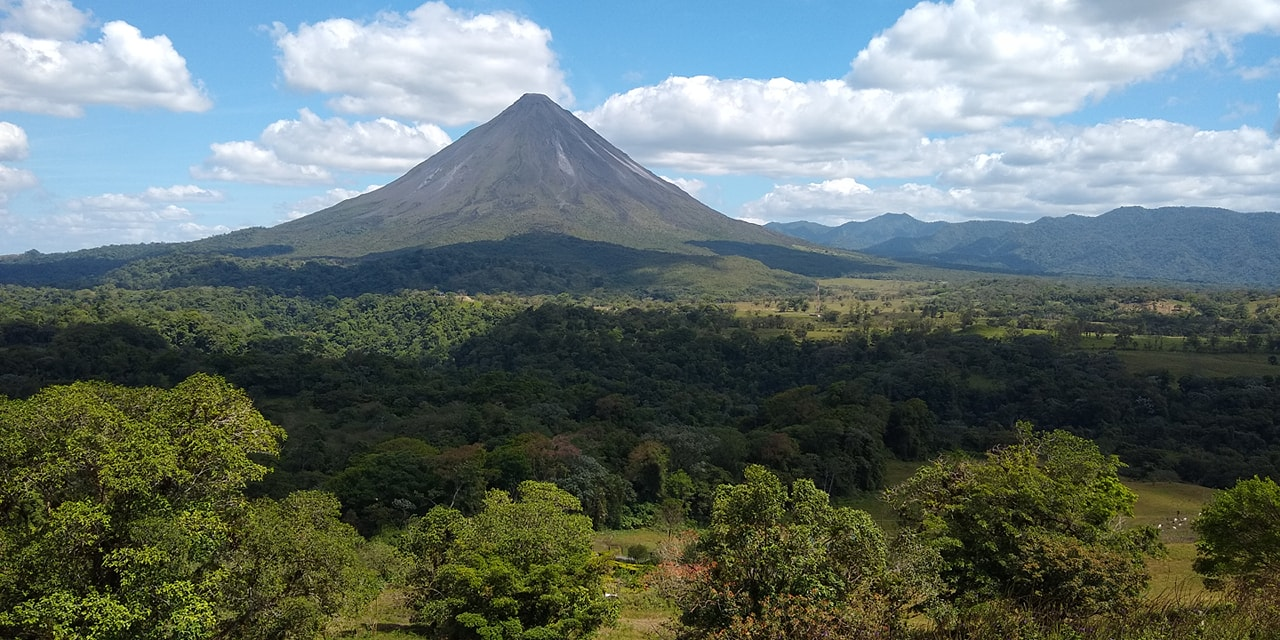
Arenal Volcano National Park.

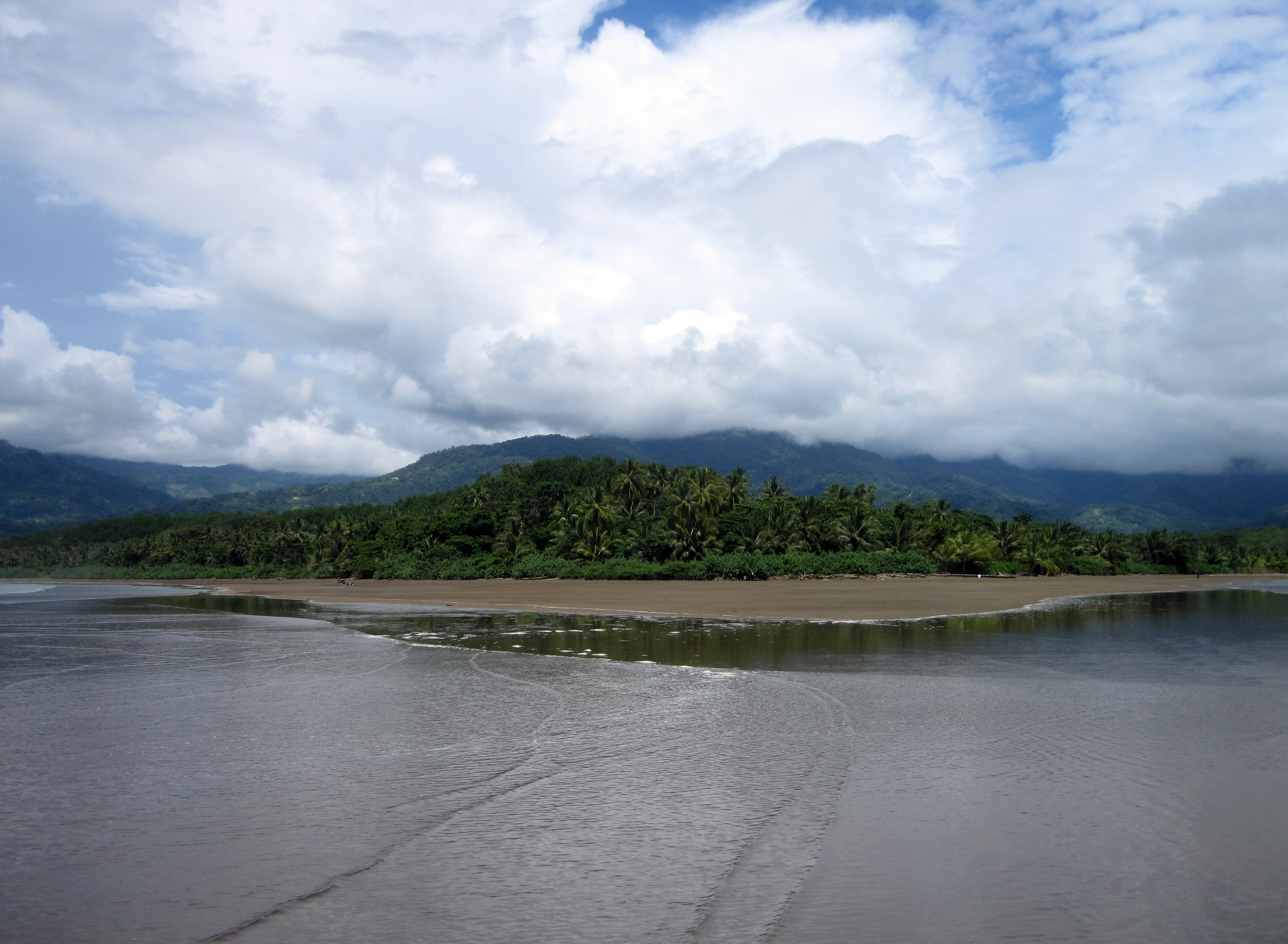
Uvita Beach, Ballena Marine National Park.

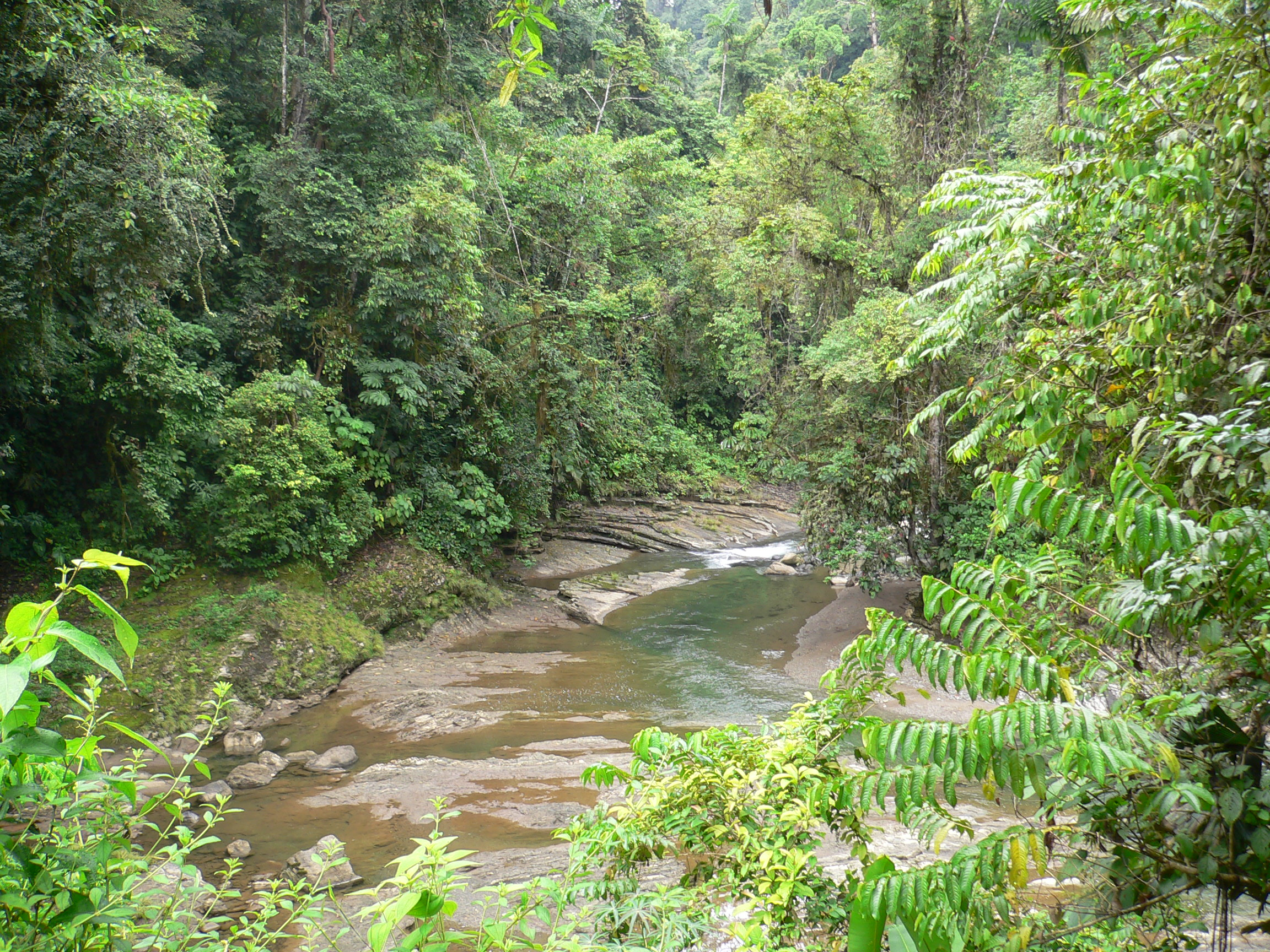
Dantas River, Barbilla National Park.

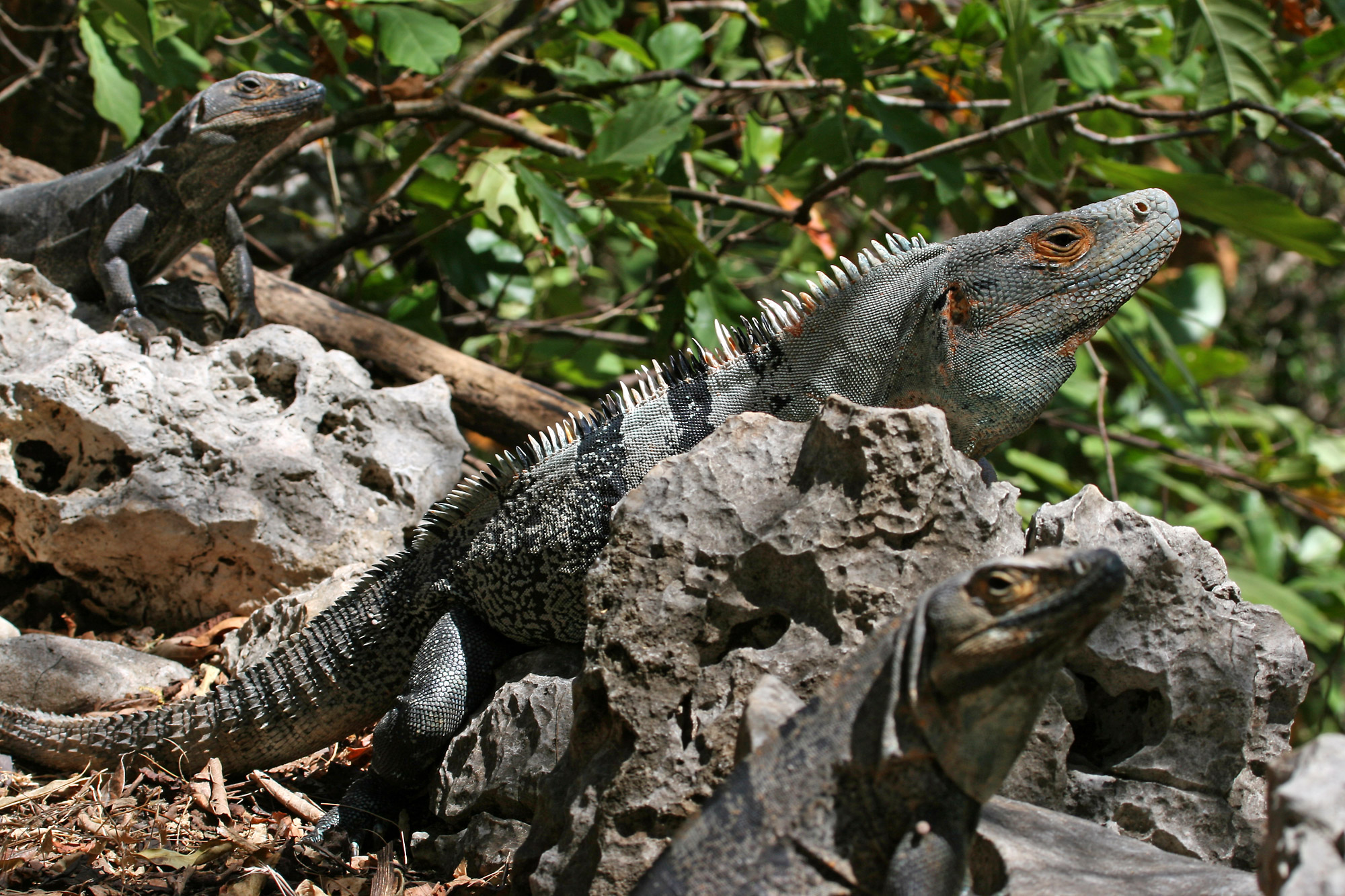
Black Iguanas in Barra Honda National Park.

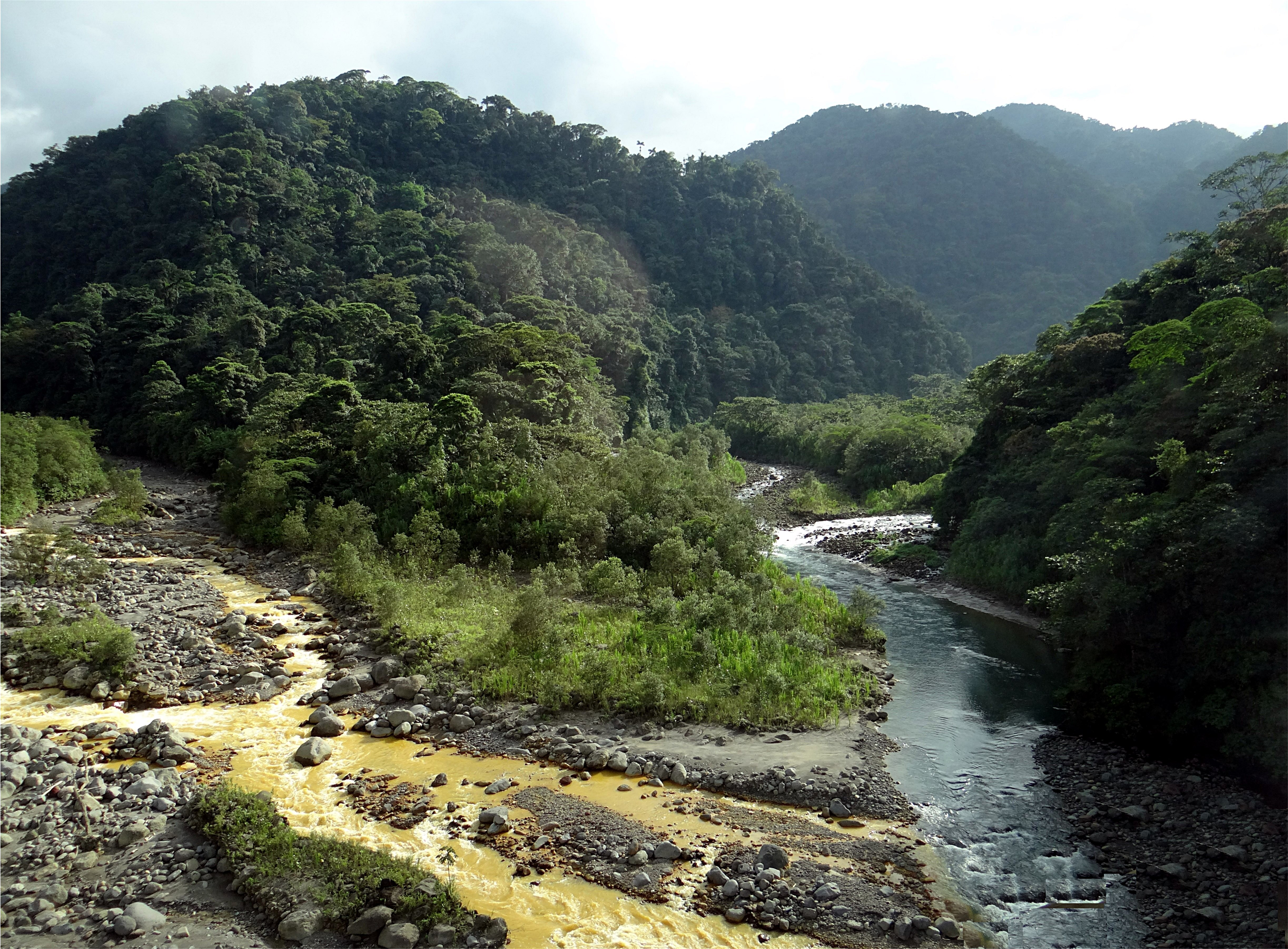
A stream polluted by volcanic sulfur in Braulio Carrillo National Park.

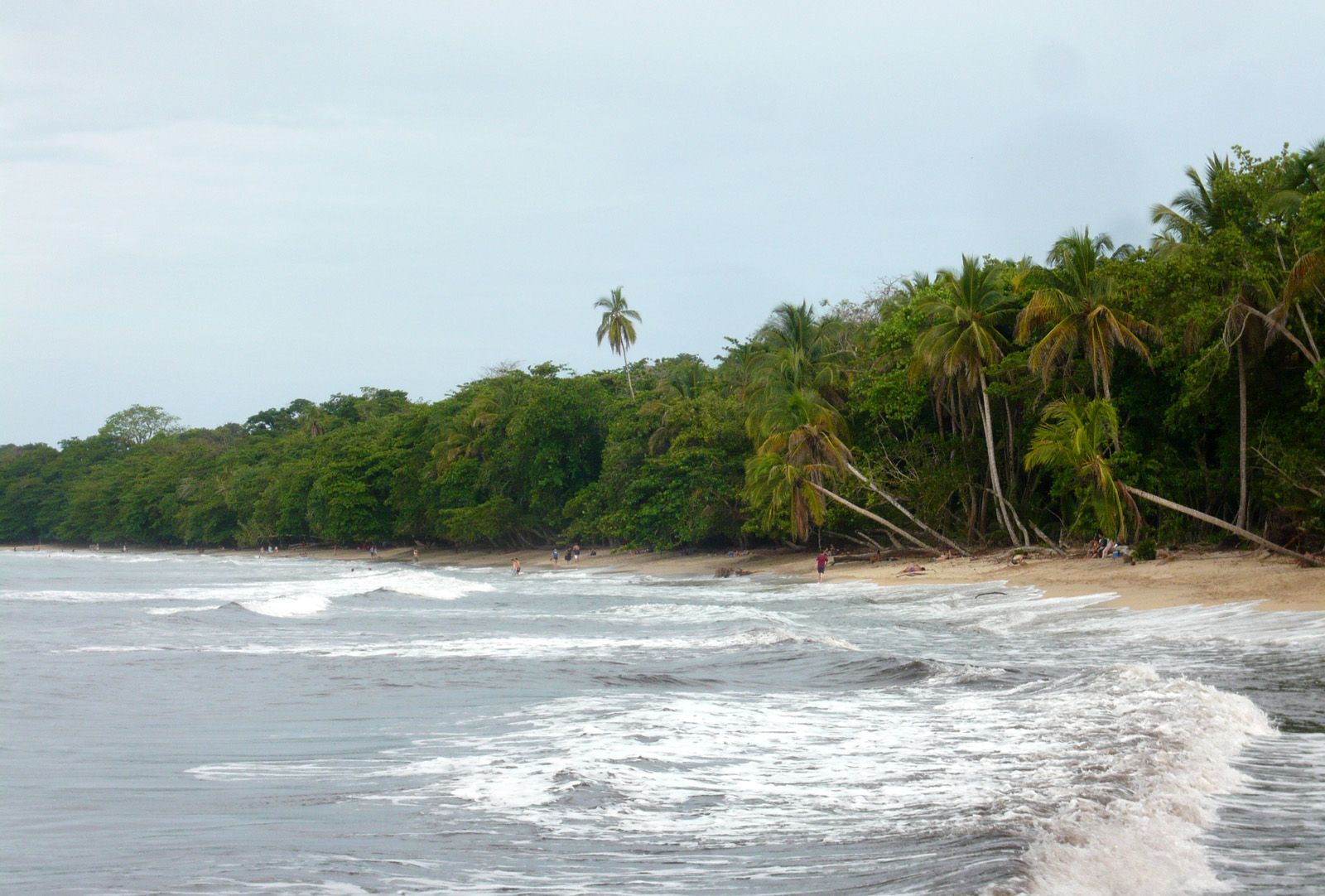
Cahuita National Park.

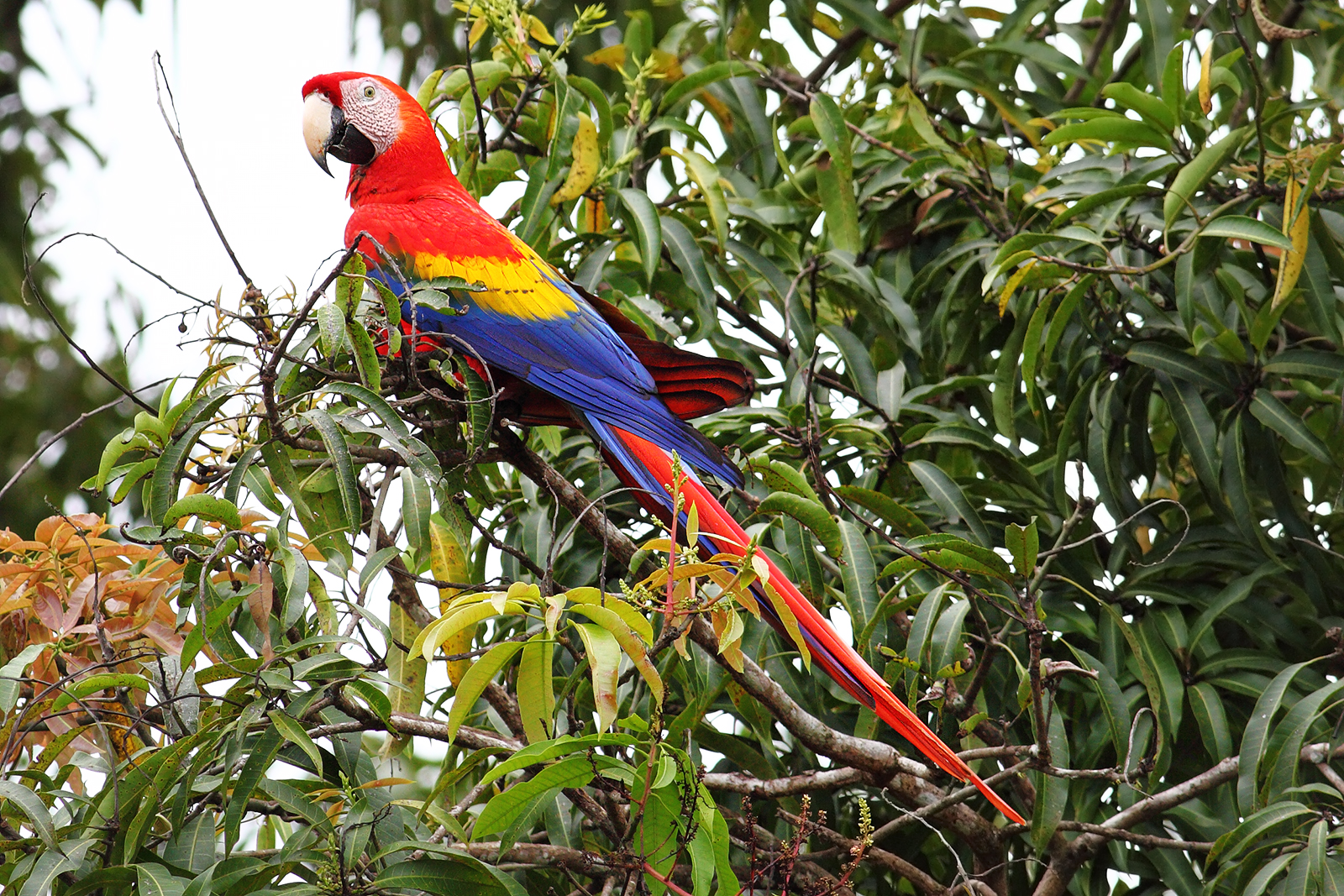
Scarlet Macaw in Carara National Park.

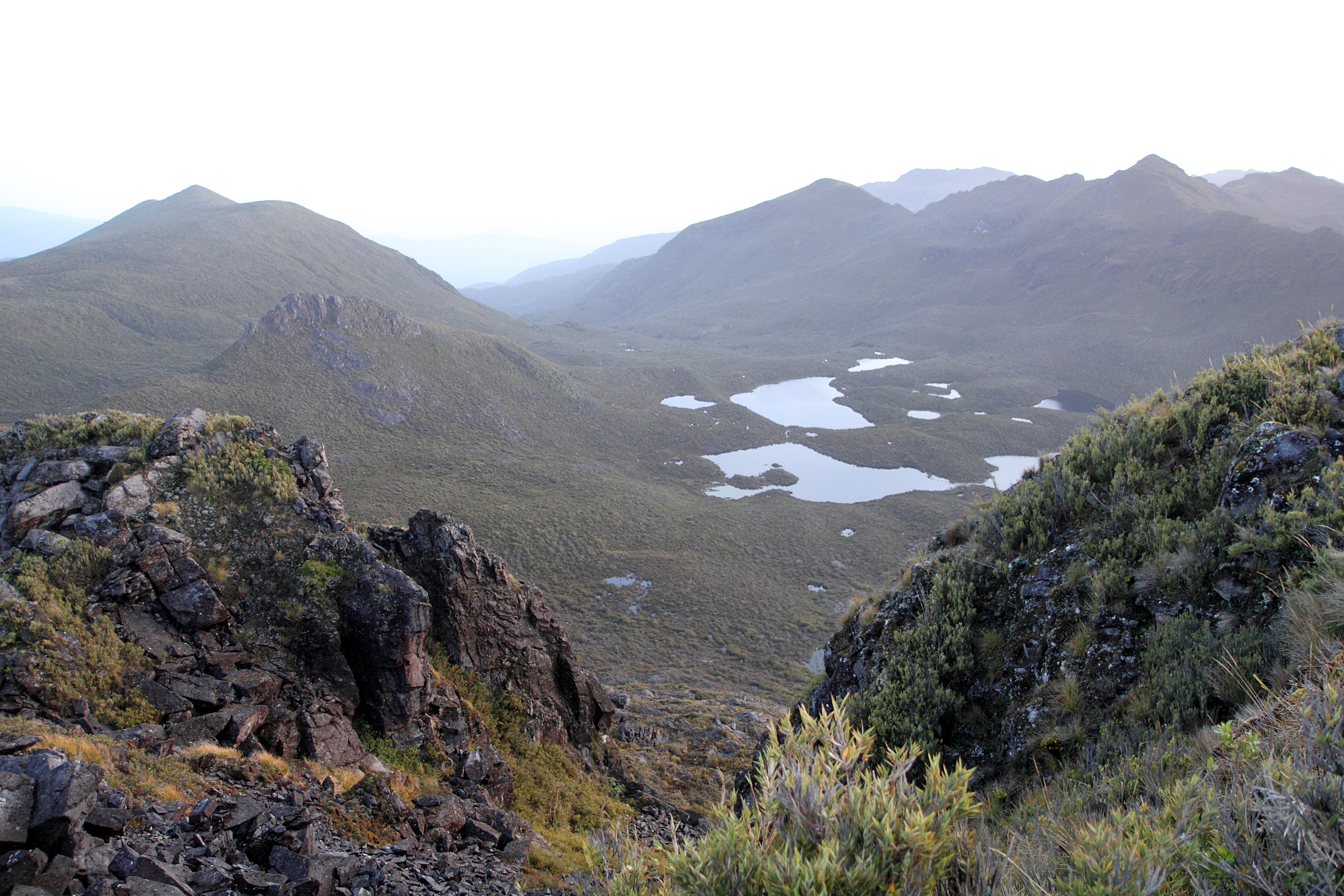
Lakes formed by glaciers above timberline in Chirripó National Park.

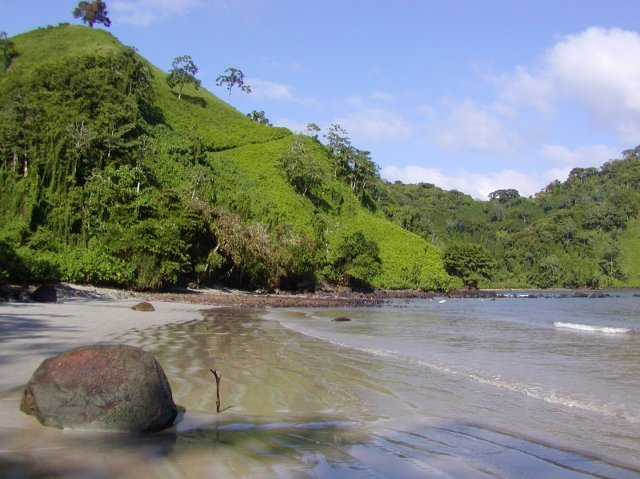
Cocos Island National Park.

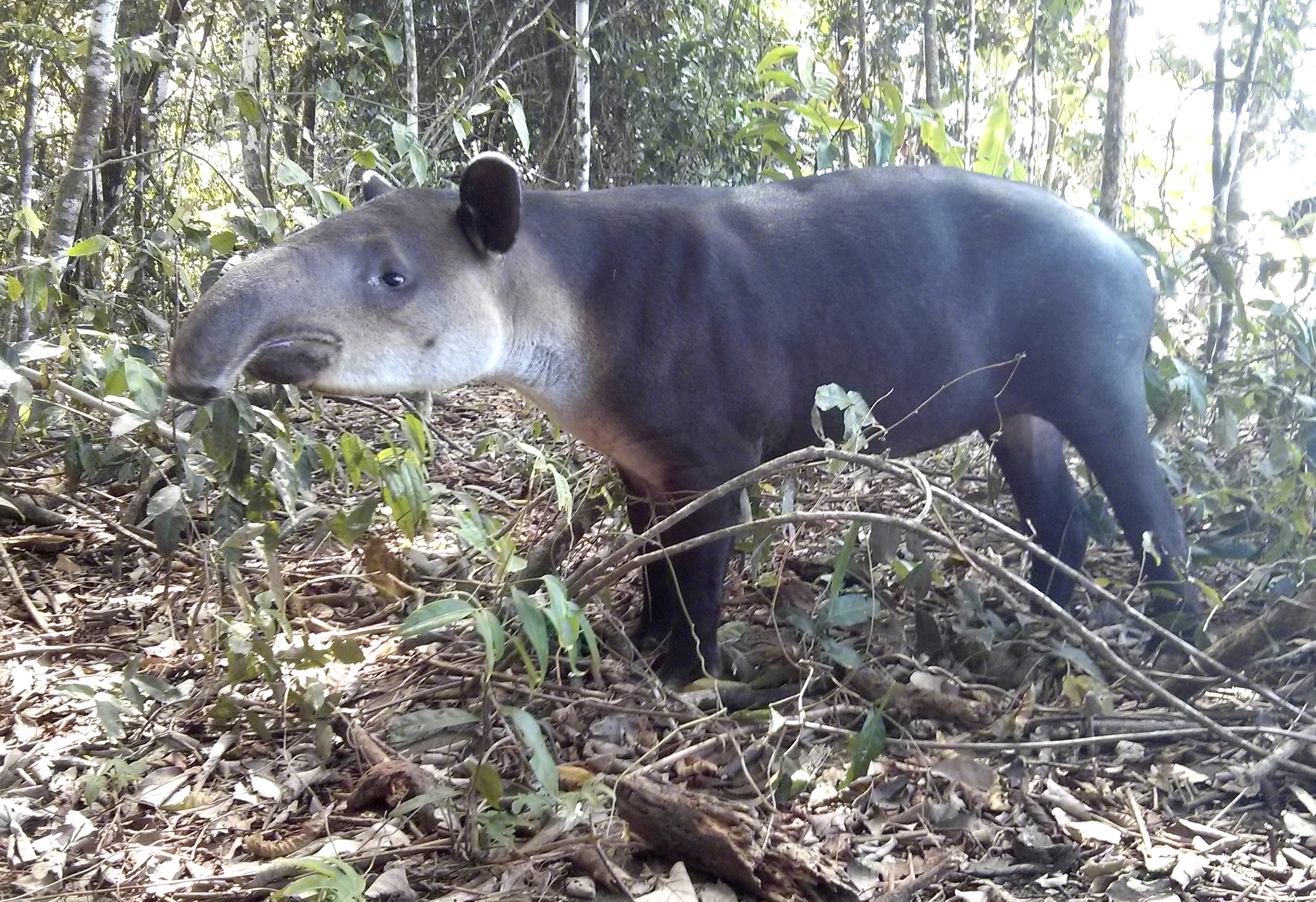
A tapir in Corcovado National Park.

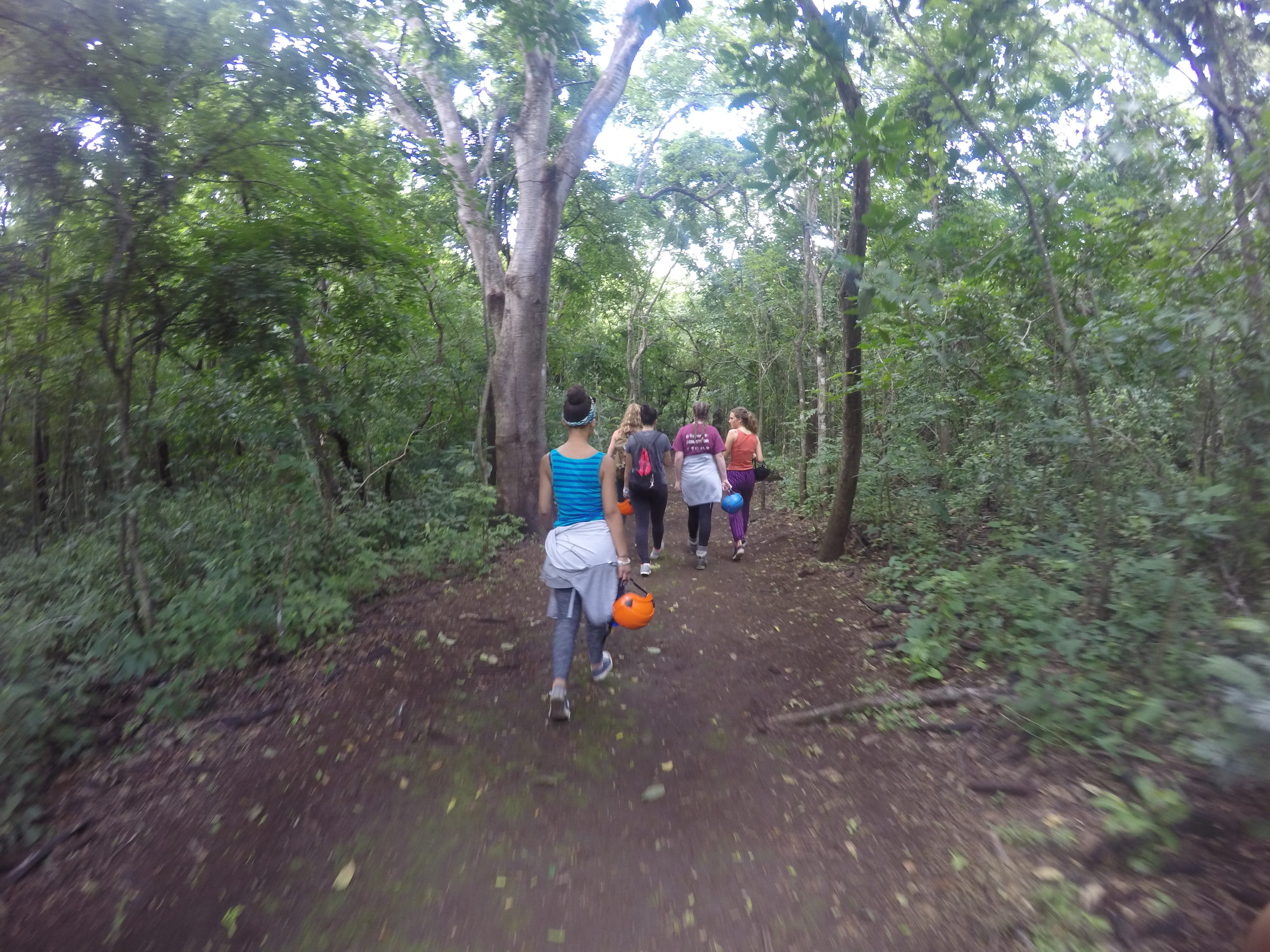
Hiking in Guanacaste National Park.

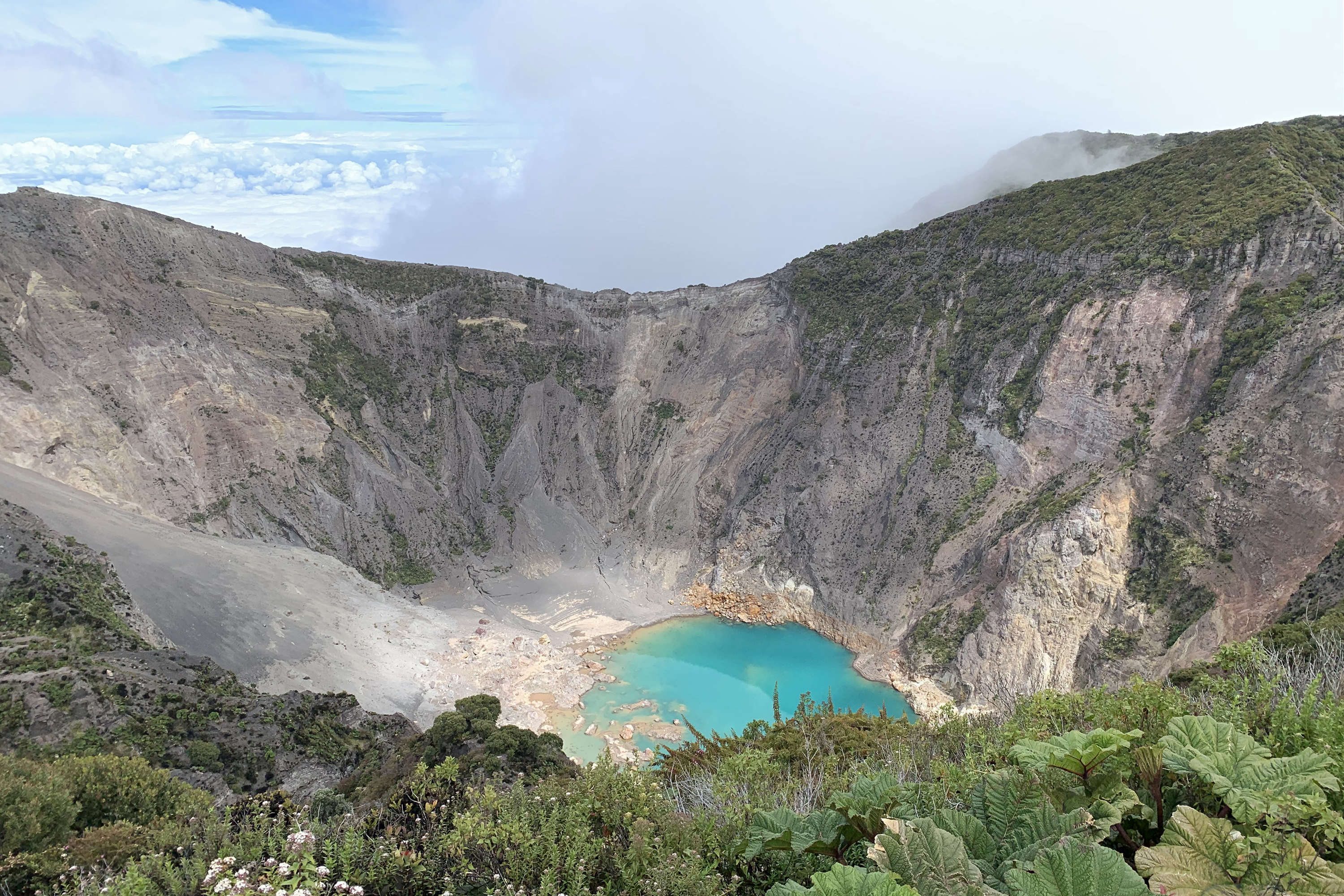
Main crater at Irazú National Park.

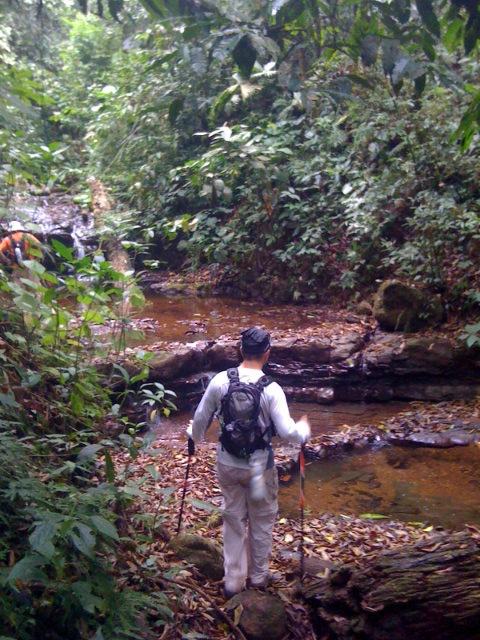
Cangreja National Park.

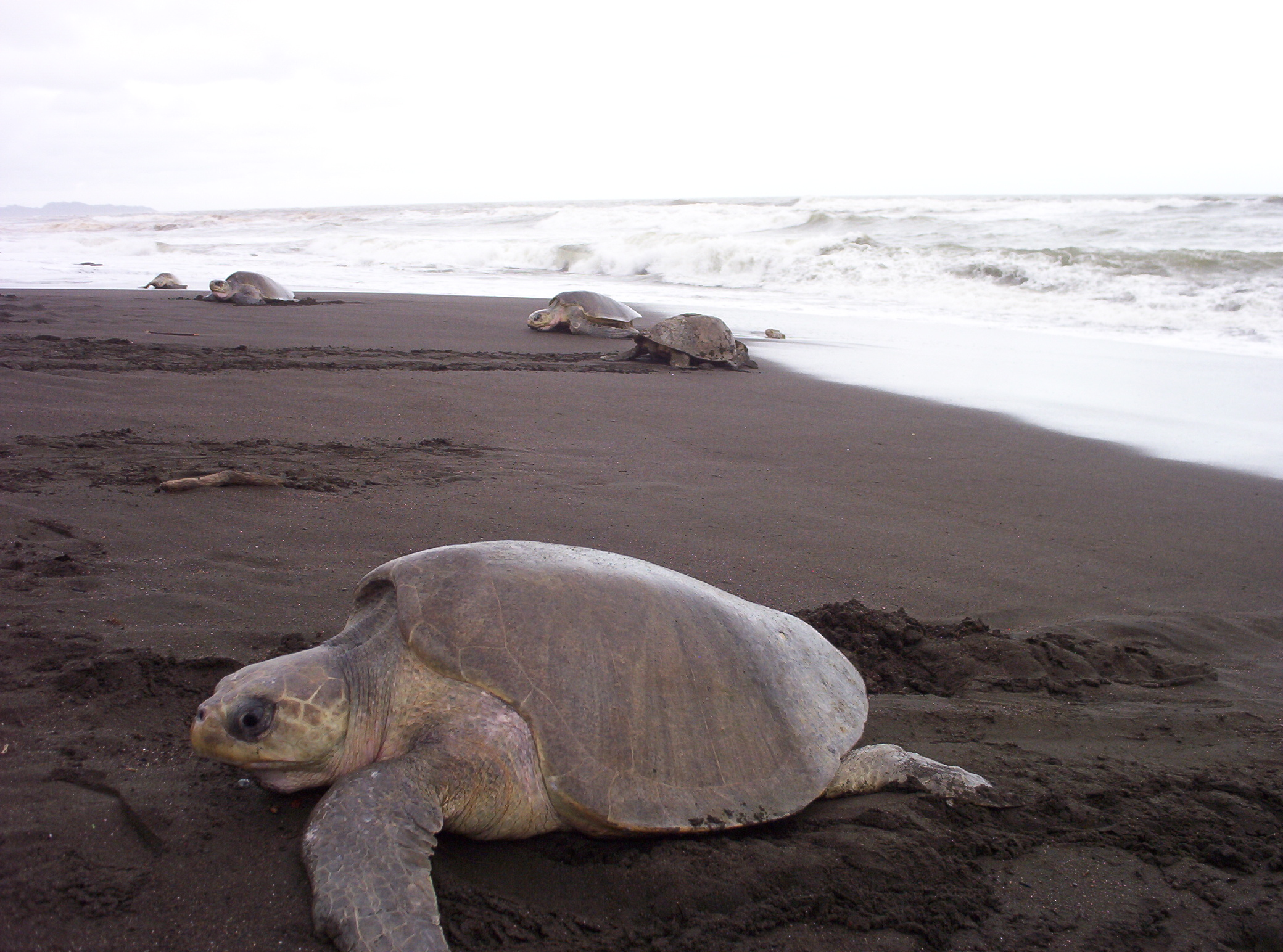
Sea turtle at Las Baulas Marine National Park.

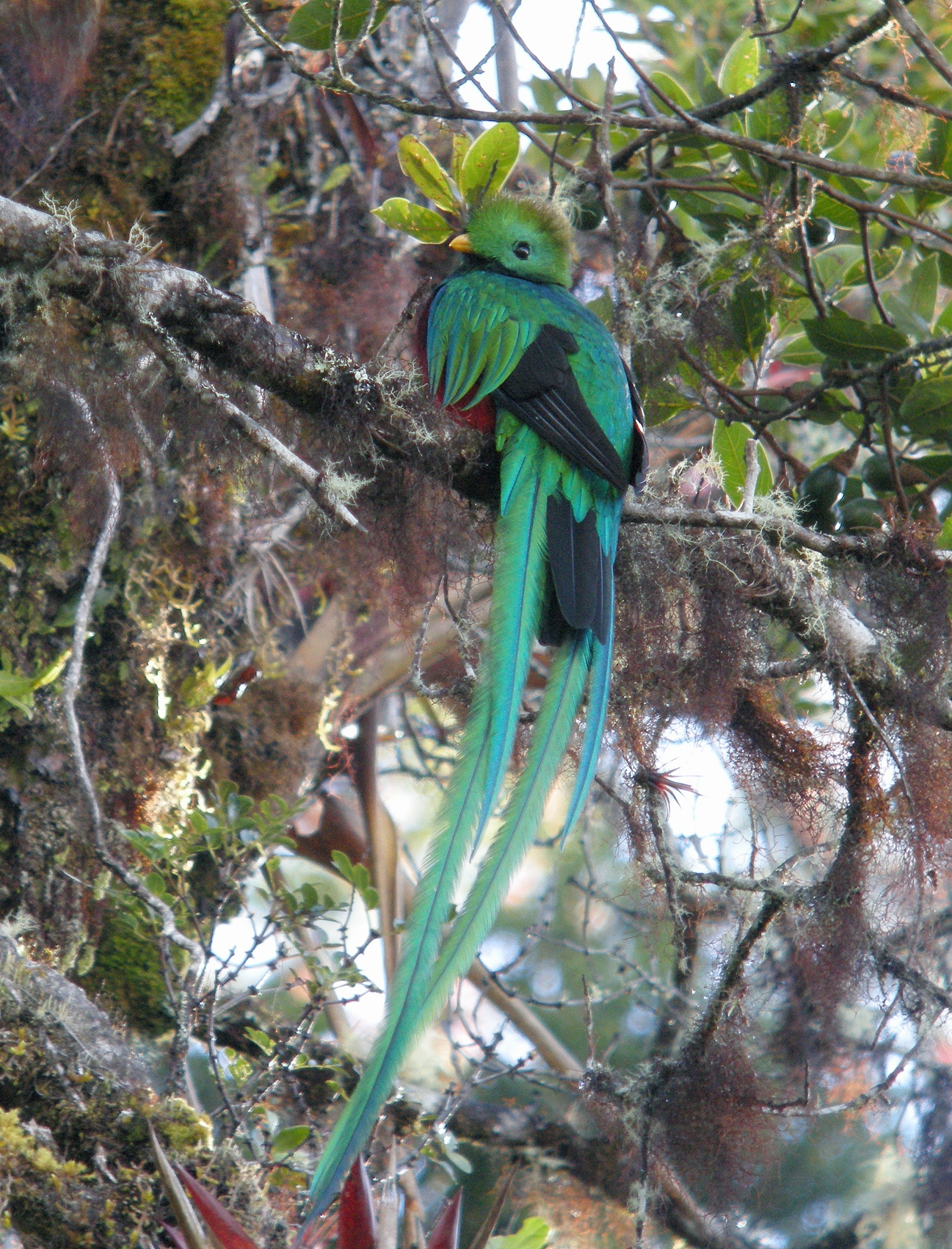
A quetzal in Los Quetzales National Park.

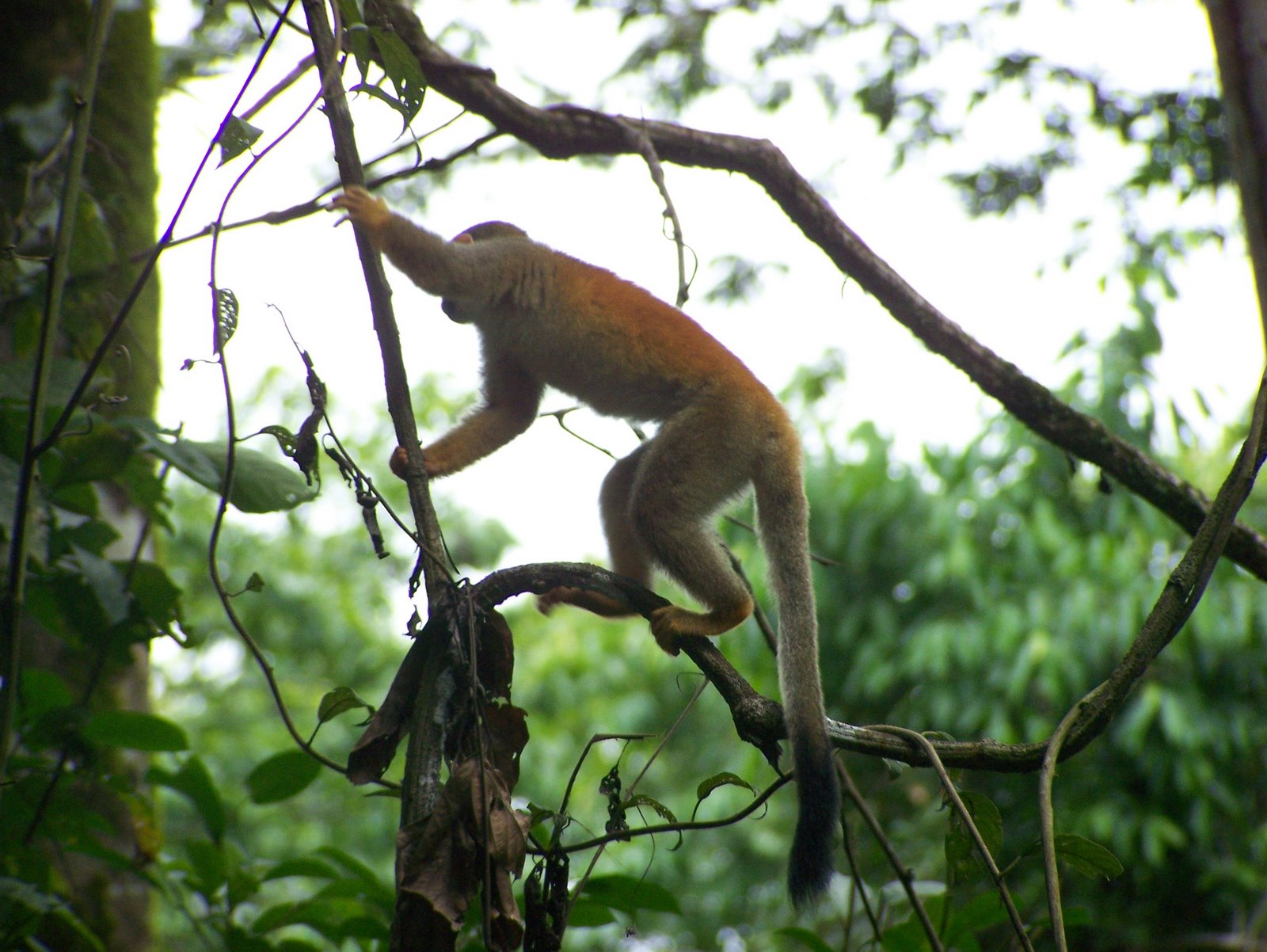
central american squirrel monkey in Manuel Antonio National Park.

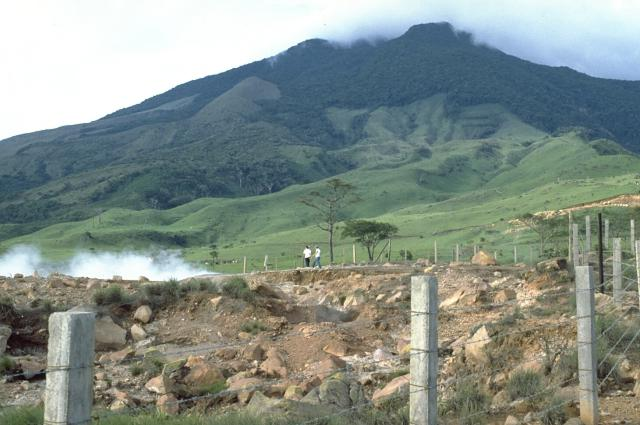
Miravalles volcano in Miravalles Jorge Manuel Dengo National Park.

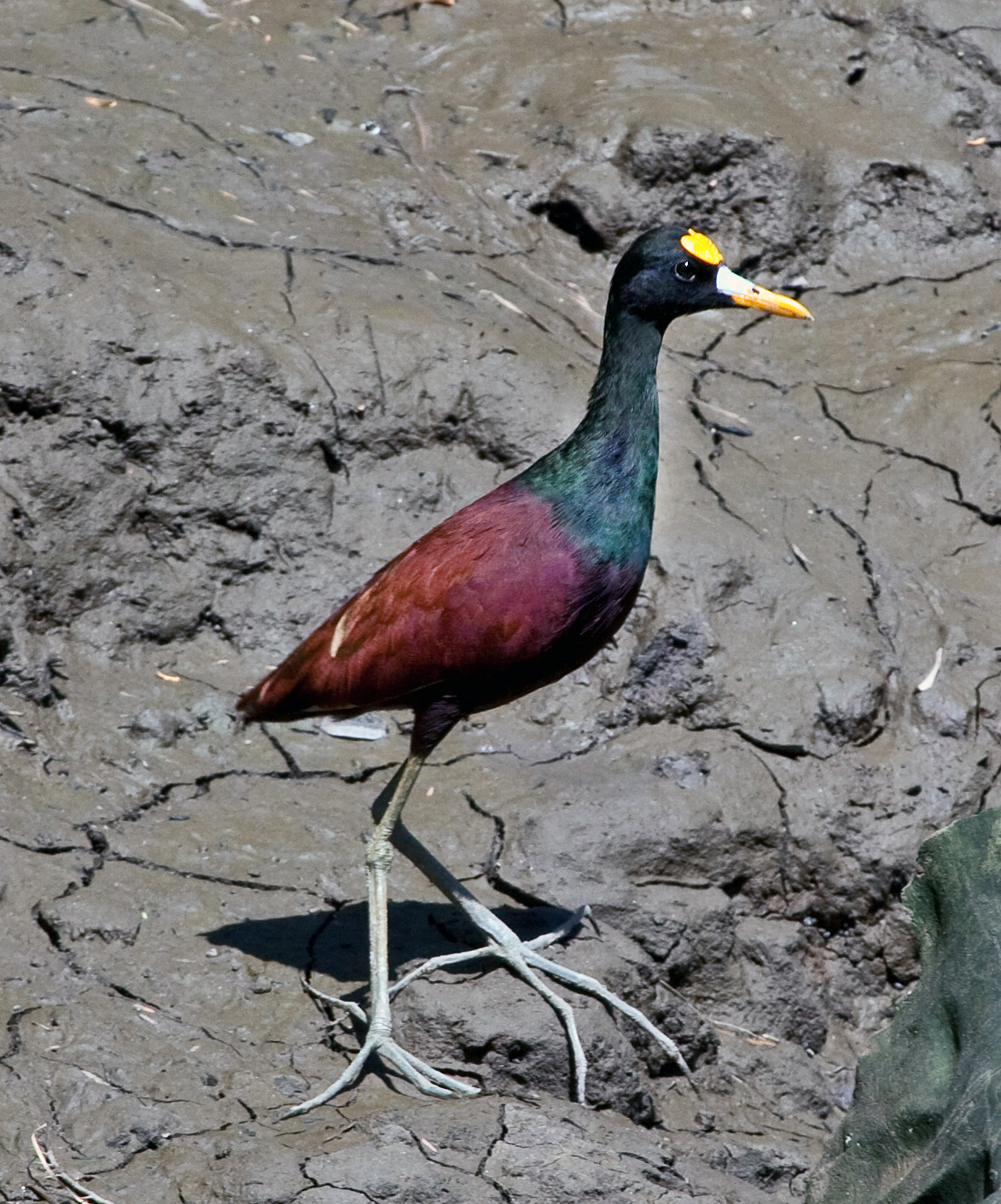
Northern Jacana at Palo Verde National Park.

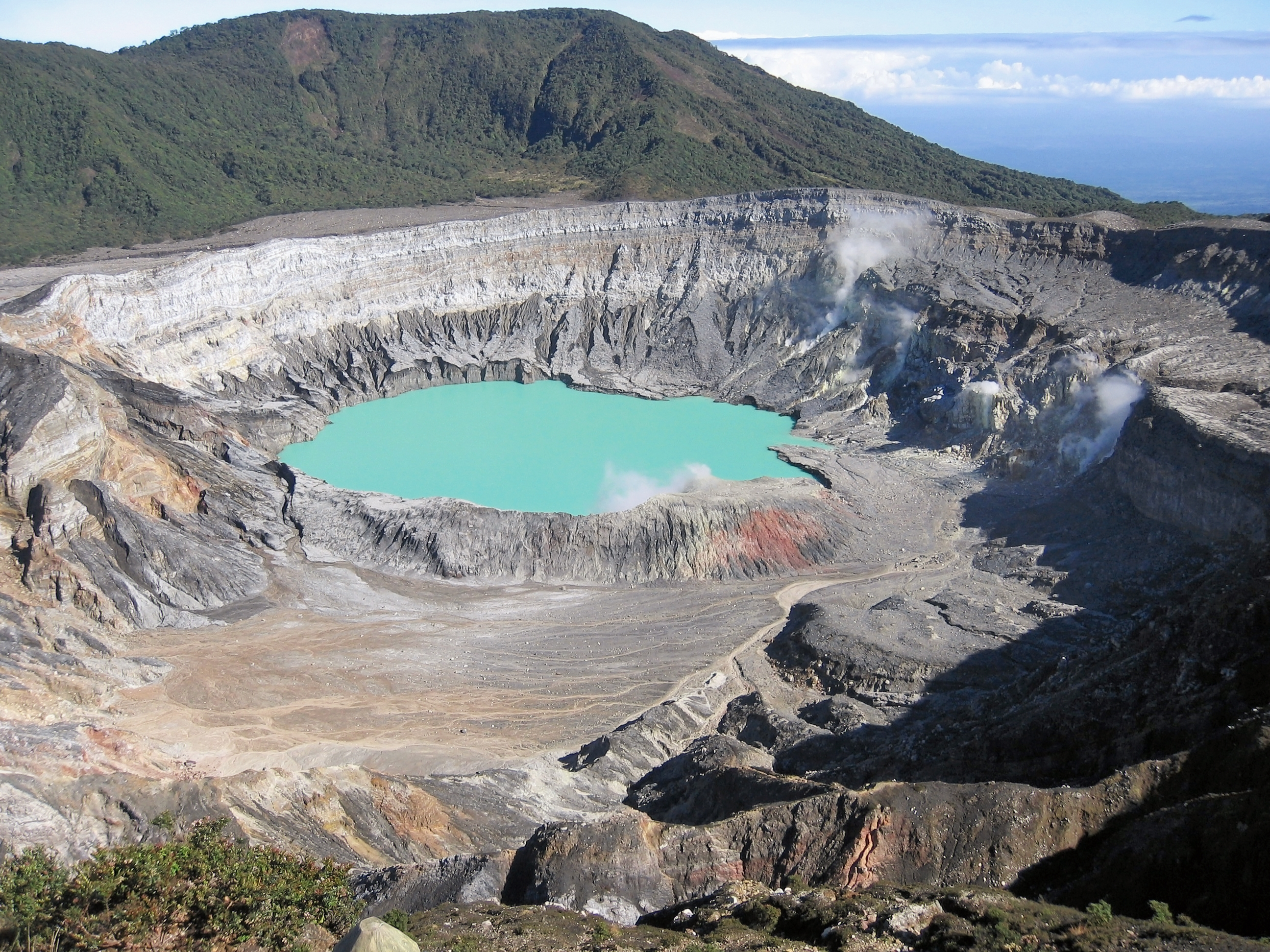
Poas crater at Poás Volcano National Park.

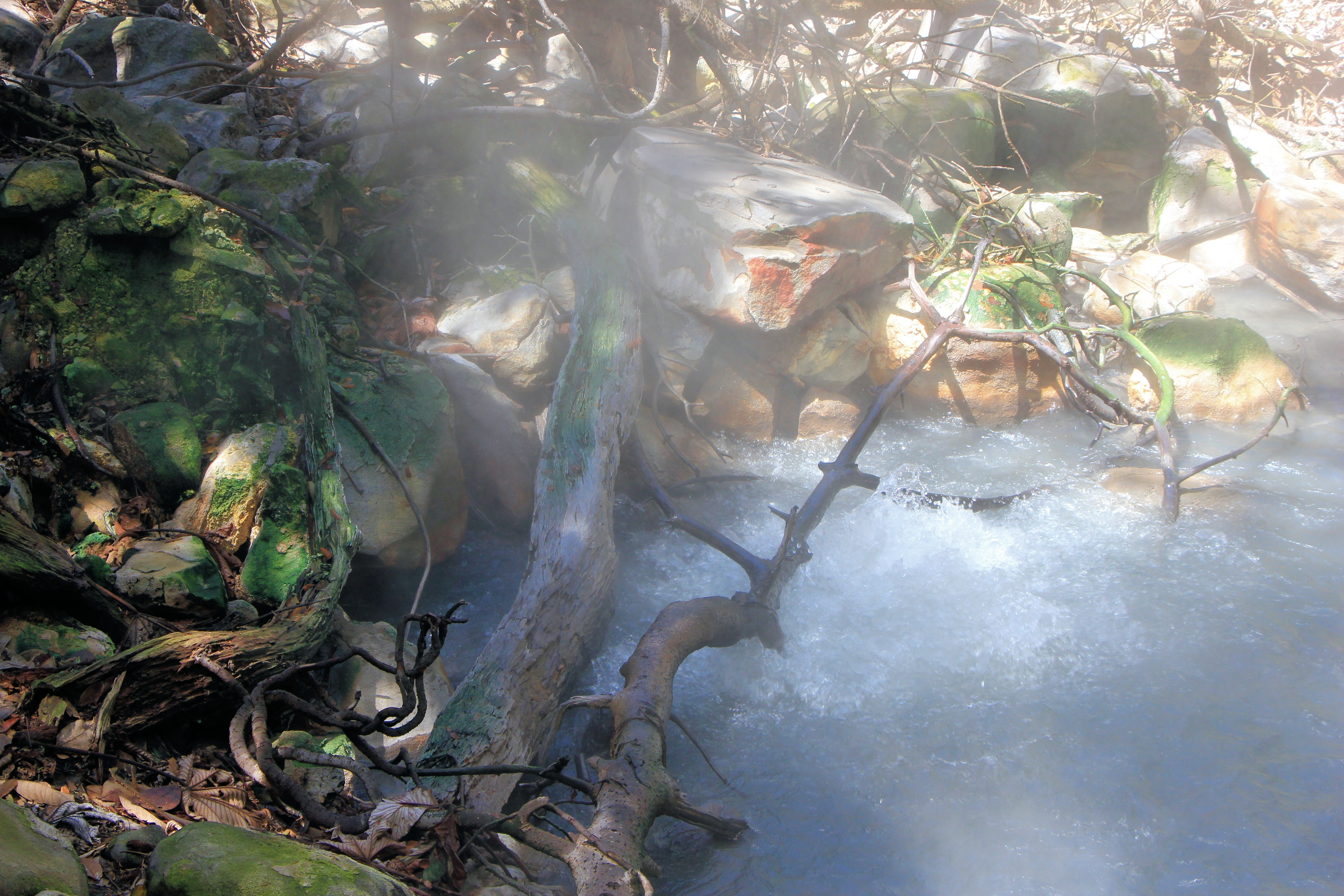
A hot spring at Rincon de la Vieja National Park.

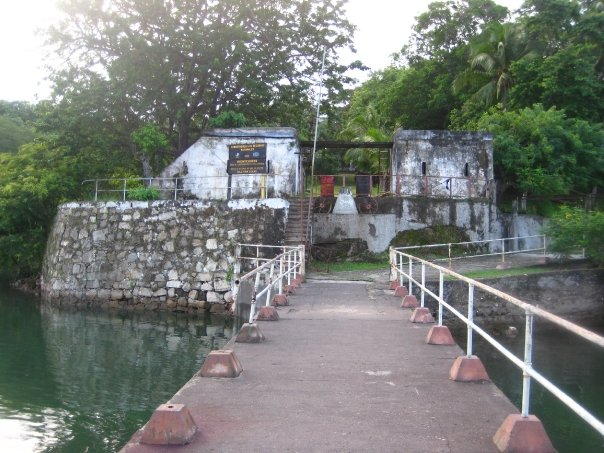
San Lucas Island National Park.

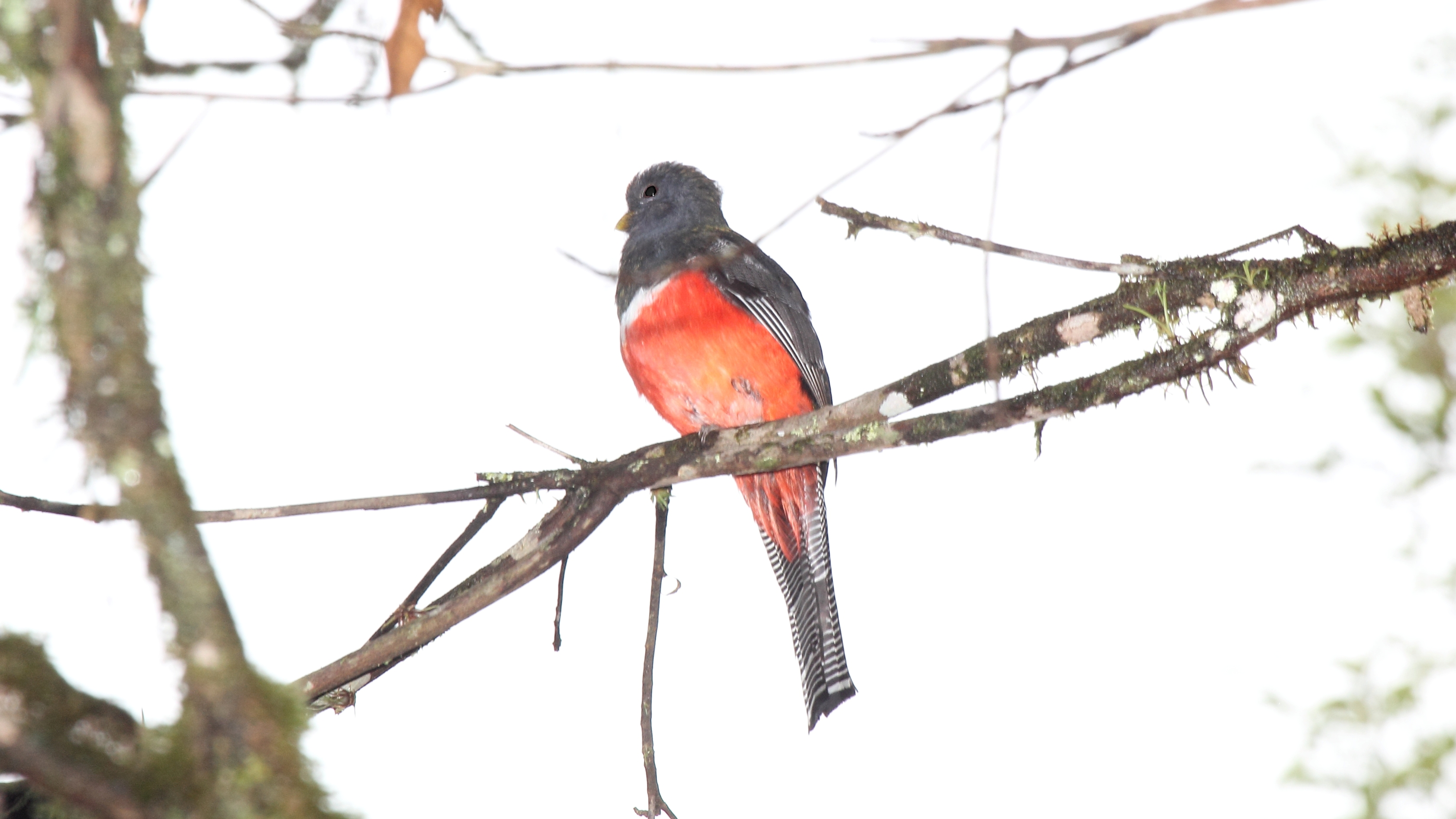
Collared trogon in Tapantí National Park.

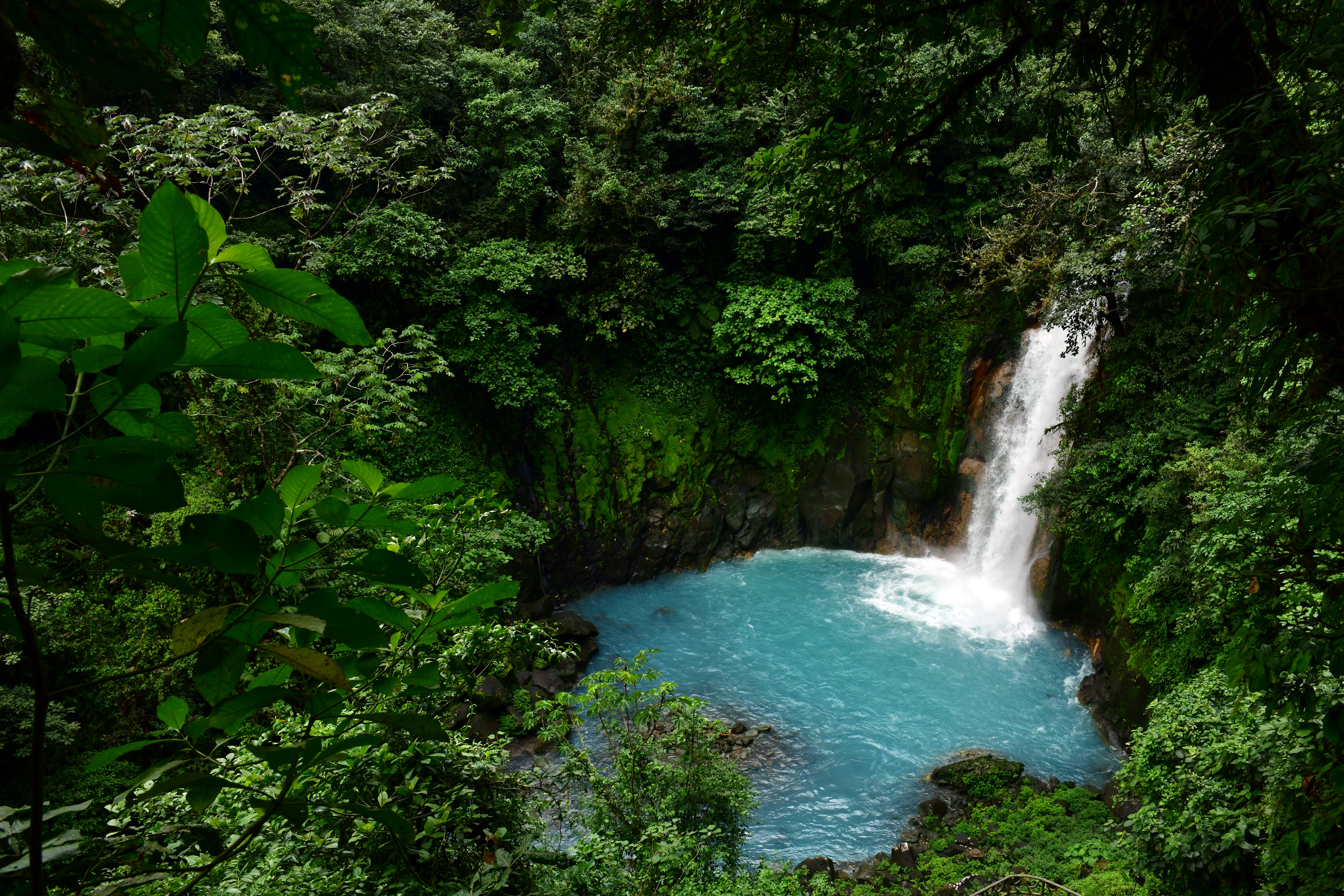
Tenorio Volcano National Park.

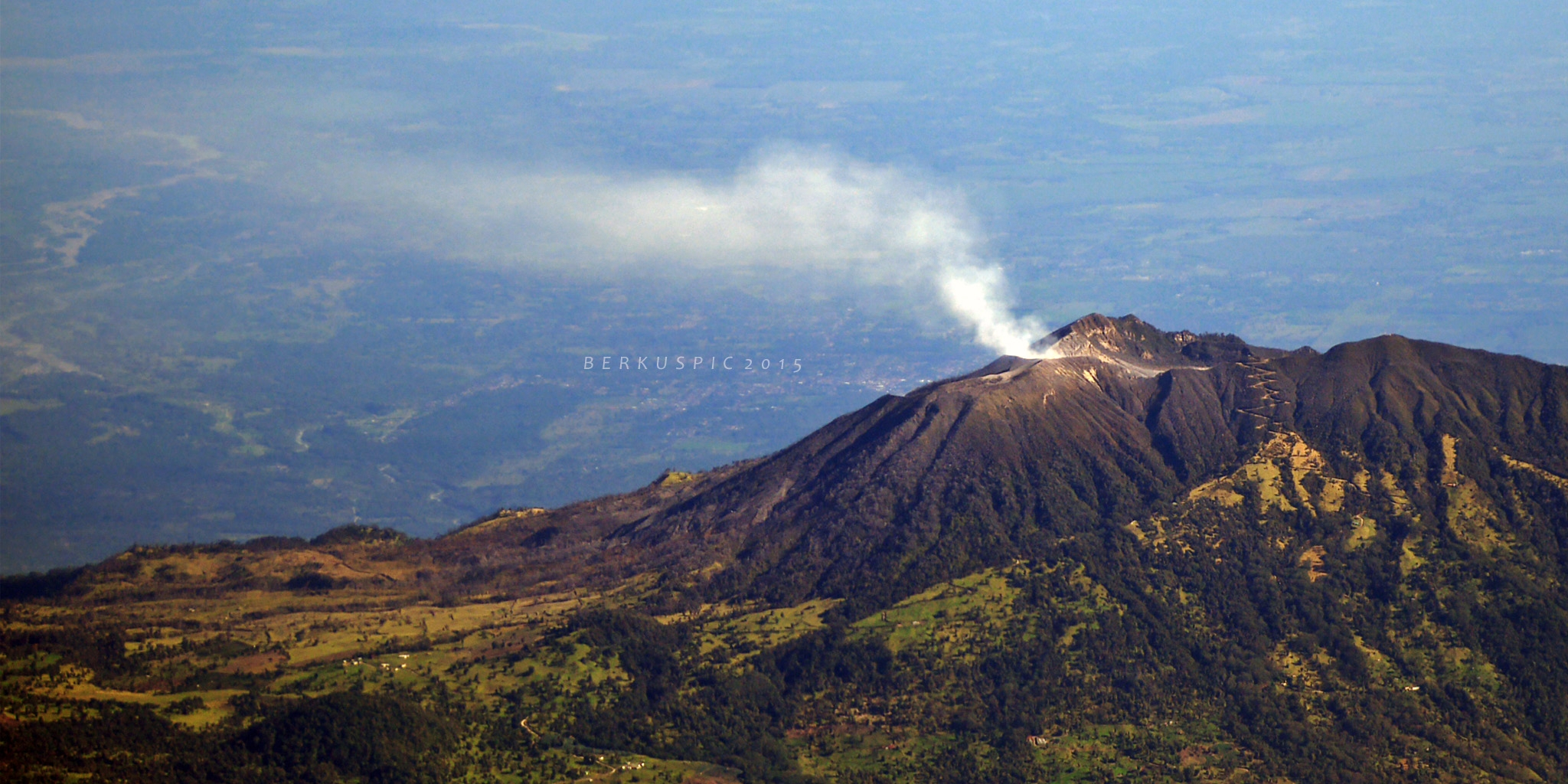
Turriaba Volcano National Park.

== See also ==
- Conservation in Costa Rica
