= Guayabo =

Guayabo or El Guayabo may refer to:

== Places ==
- Guayabo District, Costa Rica
- Guayabo National Monument, Costa Rica, site of a pre-Columbian city of that name
- Guayabo River, Costa Rica
- Guayabo Island, Costa Rica, part of the Guayabo Island Biological Reserve
- Guayabo, Mexico, site of the 1866 Battle of Guayabo, a Mexican victory over the French Empire
- El Guayabo River, El Salvador
- Guayabo, Aguada, Puerto Rico, United States, a barrio

== Other uses ==
- guayabo, Taíno and Spanish for guava

== See also ==
- Guayabos, a barrio in the municipality of Isabela, Puerto Rico
