= Curú Wildlife Refuge =

Protected area in Costa Rica

- IUCN category IV (habitat/species management area)
- Location within Costa Rica
- Location: Puntarenas Province, Costa Rica
- Coordinates: 9.7934°N 84.9226°W
- Area: 2,772 acres (11.22 km^{2})
- Established: 1983
- Governing body: National System of Conservation Areas (SINAC)

The Curú Wildlife Refuge is a Wildlife refuge of Costa Rica, part of the Tempisque Conservation Area, tropical dry forests on the southern Nicoya Peninsula, near Tambor. Although it is a wildlife refuge, it is also private property, forming part of a ranch of 12.14 square kilometres. A small region of the property is used for cattle breeding and growing crops such as soursop, guava, banana, mango and African oil palm, while the remaining area retains its natural vegetation.

The refuge protects the habitat of many types of birds, as well as animals such as white-tailed deer, mantled howler monkeys, Panamanian white-faced capuchin monkeys, coyotes, armadillos and boa constrictors.

== History ==
In 1933, the land was settled by Federico Schutt de la Croix. Schutt's goal was to develop and manage the land in order for it to become a fully self-sustained farm. Schutt constructed an hacienda on the land and transformed the surrounding area into a sustainable development project, featuring selective timber harvest and cattle grazing. Schutt also focused his efforts on agriculture, growing rice, beans, corn, plantains, mangos, and teak plantations on his land. Schutt's original ideas for the land were gradually altered as efforts were made towards the conservation of wildlife and prioritization of ecotourism.

In 1974, a portion of the Schutt family's land was overrun with squatters, prompting the family to seek protection for the land from the Costa Rican government. In 1981, most of the family's land was given the status of "Protected Forest" by the government. In 1983, the Curú Wildlife Refuge was officially established, making it the first private national wildlife refuge in Costa Rica. Since its recognition as a wildlife refuge, the Schutt family has focused on converting the area into an eco-tourism location, as well as a research center for both students and scientists.
