= Cocos Marine Conservation Area =

Conservation area in Costa Rica

- Área de Conservación Marina Coco
- Location of the area, labeled ACMC in the Pacific ocean waters of the country.
- Location: Puntarenas Province, Costa Rica
- Coordinates: 05°31′41″N 87°03′40″W
- Governing body: National System of Conservation Areas (SINAC)

Cocos Marine Conservation Area (Spanish: Área de Conservación Marina Cocos (ACMC)) is an administrative area which is managed by SINAC for the purposes of conservation of Cocos Island, in the Pacific Ocean national waters of Costa Rica.

This conservation area stretches from the south extreme point of Nicoya Peninsula towards Cocos Island, geographically as an island territory, it has pronounced topography, it is frequently cloudy and has copious amounts of rain year round. Cocos Island National Park and two marine management areas are within the ACMC.

There are 235 plant species, 400 of insects (65 endemic), 5 of reptiles (2 terrestrial endémic), 3 of marine turtles, 100 of birds (13 resident, 3 endemic), 50 arthropods (7 endemic), 57 of crustaceans, 600 of marine molluscs and 250 of fish.

Among fish there are whitetip shark, hammerhead shark, yellowfin tuna, parrotfish, manta ray and jurel.

== Protected areas ==
Research and conservation activities associated with the Cocos Marine Conservation Area have included a 2009 National Geographic Pristine Seas expedition with partners including Conservation International. A telemetry study of scalloped hammerhead sharks around Cocos Island was funded by Conservation International Costa Rica, among other organisations.

- Cocos Island National Park
- Submarine Mountains Marine Management Area, the waters surrounding the Cocos Island National Park area.
