= Cipancí Wildlife Refuge =

Wildlife refuge in Costa Rica

- Location within Costa Rica
- Location: Costa Rica
- Coordinates: 10.320519°N 85.349573°W
- Area: 3,760 acres (15.2 km^{2})
- Established: 2001
- Governing body: National System of Conservation Areas (SINAC)

The Cipancí Wildlife Refuge is a Wildlife refuge of Costa Rica, part of the Tempisque Conservation Area, and protects tropical forest and wetlands on the banks of the Tempisque River near Abangares in the Guanacaste Province.
