= Submarine Mountains Marine Management Area =

Protected area in Costa Rica

Submarine Mountains Management Marine Area
- Área Marina de Manejo Montes Submarinos
- Location within Central America
- Location: Costa Rica
- Coordinates: 5.459°N 87.217°W
- Area: 9,622.62 square kilometres (3,715.31 sq mi) (marine)
- Established: 11 June 1978
- Governing body: National System of Conservation Areas (SINAC)

Submarine Mountains Management Marine Area (Spanish: Área Marina de Manejo Montes Submarinos), is a protected area in the Pacific Ocean territorial waters of Costa Rica, surrounding the Cocos Island and managed under the Cocos Marine Conservation Area, it was created in 1978 by decree 8748-A.
