= La Cruz Hill Protected Zone =

Protected area in Costa Rica

- Zona Protectora Cerro La Cruz
- IUCN category VI (protected area with sustainable use of natural resources)
- Location within Costa Rica
- Location: Costa Rica
- Coordinates: 10.1297°N 85.4542°W
- Area: 1.99 square kilometres (0.77 sq mi)
- Established: 18 May 1994
- Governing body: National System of Conservation Areas (SINAC)

La Cruz Hill Protected Zone (Spanish: Zona Protectora Cerro La Cruz), is a protected area in Costa Rica, managed under the Tempisque Conservation Area, it was created in 1994 by decree 23249-MIRENEM.
