= Nicoya Peninsula Protected Zone =

Protected area in Costa Rica

- Zona Protectora Península de Nicoya
- IUCN category VI (protected area with sustainable use of natural resources)
- Location within Costa Rica
- Location: Costa Rica
- Coordinates: 9.843°N 85.108°W
- Area: 217.14 square kilometres (83.84 sq mi)
- Established: 10 March 1994
- Governing body: National System of Conservation Areas (SINAC)

Nicoya Peninsula Protected Zone (Spanish: Zona Protectora Península de Nicoya), is a protected area in Costa Rica, managed under the Tempisque Conservation Area, it was created in 1994 by executive decree 22968-MIRENEM.
