= Monte Alto Protected Zone =

Protected area in Costa Rica

- Zona Protectora Monte Alto
- Location within Costa Rica
- Location: Costa Rica
- Coordinates: 10.017°N 85.403°W
- Area: 9.03 square kilometres (3.49 sq mi)
- Established: 10 March 1994
- Governing body: National System of Conservation Areas (SINAC)

Monte Alto Protected Zone (Spanish: Zona Protectora Monte Alto), is a protected area in Costa Rica, managed under the Tempisque Conservation Area, it was created in 1994 by decree 22967-MIRENEM.
