= Cabo Blanco Marine Management Area =

Protected area in Costa Rica

- Área Marina de Manejo Cabo Blanco
- Location within Costa Rica
- Location: Costa Rica
- Coordinates: 9.558°N 85.111°W
- Area: 820.69 square kilometres (316.87 sq mi) (marine)
- Established: 2 June 2017
- Governing body: National System of Conservation Areas (SINAC)

Cabo Blanco Marine Management Area (Spanish: Área Marina de Manejo Cabo Blanco), is a protected area in Costa Rica, managed under the Tempisque Conservation Area, it was created in 2017 by decree 40442-MINAE.
