= Corral de Piedra Palustrine Wetland =

Protected area in Costa Rica

- Humedal Palustrino Corral de Piedra
- Location within Costa Rica
- Location: Costa Rica
- Coordinates: 10.278°N 85.311°W
- Area: 23.85 square kilometres (9.21 sq mi)
- Established: 23 February 1994
- Governing body: National System of Conservation Areas (SINAC)

Corral de Piedra Palustrine Wetland (Spanish: Humedal Palustrino Corral de Piedra), is a protected area in Costa Rica, managed under the Tempisque Conservation Area, it was created in 1994 by decree 22898-MIRENEM.
