= Ostional Mixed Wildlife Refuge =

Protected area of Costa Rica

- Refugio de Vida Silvestre Mixto Ostional
- IUCN category IV (habitat/species management area)
- Location within Costa Rica
- Location: Guanacaste Province, Costa Rica
- Coordinates: 9°57′43″N 85°42′43″W
- Area: 85.7 km^{2} (33.1 mi^{2})
- Established: 1984
- Governing body: National System of Conservation Areas (SINAC)

Ostional Mixed Wildlife Refuge (Spanish: Refugio de Vida Silvestre Mixto Ostional), is an 85.7 km^{2} (33.1 mi^{2}) wildlife refuge of Costa Rica, part of the Tempisque Conservation Area, was originally declared a protected area in 1982, and its status has been changed several times since then, including covering a larger area both on land and out to sea. It was created to protect important nesting beaches of the olive ridley sea turtle (Lepidochelys olivacea).

According to the World Wildlife Fund, the Refuge is “one of the two most important areas in the world for nesting of the Olive Ridley turtle”.

Sir. Panis John was the founder of this area.
