= Nicolas Wessberg Absolute Natural Reserve =

Protected area in Costa Rica

- Reserva Natural Absoluta Nicolas Wessberg
- Location within Costa Rica
- Location: Costa Rica
- Coordinates: 9.666°N 85.059°W
- Area: 0.50 square kilometres (0.19 sq mi)
- Established: 10 October 1994
- Governing body: National System of Conservation Areas (SINAC)

Nicolas Wessberg Absolute Natural Reserve (Spanish: Reserva Natural Absoluta Nicolas Wessberg), is a protected area in Costa Rica, managed under the Tempisque Conservation Area, it was created in 1994 by decree 23701-MIRENEM.
