= Mata Redonda Wildlife Refuge =

Costa Rica conservation area

- IUCN category IV (habitat/species management area)
- Location within Costa Rica
- Location: Guanacaste, Costa Rica
- Nearest city: Rosario, Guanacaste
- Coordinates: 10°18′53″N 85°24′54″W
- Area: 920 acres (3.7 km^{2})
- Established: 1994
- Governing body: National System of Conservation Areas (SINAC)

The Mata Redonda Wildlife Refuge is a Wildlife refuge of Costa Rica, part of the Tempisque Conservation Area, which protects tropical forest and wetlands near the Tempisque River and the town of Rosario, Guanacaste.

It consists of seasonal palustrine wetland and contains habitats suitable for over 60 species of resident and migratory water birds, including black-bellied whistling ducks and jabiru.
