= Camaronal Wildlife Refuge =

Wildlife refuge in Costa Rica

- Location within Costa Rica
- Location: Guanacaste Province, Costa Rica
- Coordinates: 9.8566°N 85.4234°W
- Area: 578 acres (2.34 km^{2})
- Established: 1994
- Governing body: National System of Conservation Areas (SINAC)

The Camaronal Wildlife Refuge is a Wildlife refuge of Costa Rica, part of the Tempisque Conservation Area, on the Pacific Coast of the Nicoya Peninsula.

The refuge was created for the protection of sea turtles nesting sites for leatherback, olive ridley and hawksbill turtles. The success of the program was evidenced by the November 2006 mass arrival of egg-laying turtles (the first registered in 15 years). Unfortunately, proposed massive and unregulated real-estate developments constitute a grave threat to the Camaronal Wildlife Refuge. Although there is a groundswell of activism opposing said development, the Camaronal Wildlife Refuge's future remains uncertain.
