= Cañas River Lacustrine Wetland =

Protected area in Costa Rica

- Humedal Lacustrino Rio Cañas
- Location within Costa Rica
- Location: Costa Rica
- Coordinates: 10.334°N 85.614°W
- Area: 6.56 square kilometres (2.53 sq mi)
- Established: 7 April 1994
- Governing body: National System of Conservation Areas (SINAC)

Cañas River Lacustrine Wetland (Spanish: Humedal Lacustrino Rio Cañas), is a protected area in Costa Rica, managed under the Tempisque Conservation Area, it was created in 1994 by decree 23075-MIRENEM.
