= Guayabo Island Biological Reserve =

Protected area in Costa Rica

- Reserva Biológica Isla Guayabo
- IUCN category Ia (strict nature reserve)
- Location within Costa Rica
- Location: Costa Rica
- Coordinates: 9.91187°N 84.87874°W
- Area: 0.06 square kilometres (0.023 sq mi)
- Established: 21 March 1973
- Governing body: National System of Conservation Areas (SINAC)

Guayabo Island Biological Reserve (Spanish: Reserva Biológica Isla Guayabo), is a protected area in Costa Rica, managed under the Tempisque Conservation Area, it was created in 1973 by executive decree 2858-A DEL.

It is the location for many nesting sites for brown pelicans as well as various other species of birds.

Nearby are the Negritos Islands Biological Reserve in the same Tempisque Conservation Area, and Pájaros Island Biological Reserve managed under Central Pacific Conservation Area.
