= Werner Sauter Wildlife Refuge =

Protected area in Costa Rica

- Refugio de Vida Silvestre Werner Sauter
- IUCN category VI (protected area with sustainable use of natural resources)
- Location within Costa Rica
- Location: Costa Rica
- Coordinates: 9.891°N 85.519°W
- Area: 1.45 square kilometres (0.56 sq mi)
- Established: 19 July 1995
- Governing body: National System of Conservation Areas (SINAC)

Werner Sauter Wildlife Refuge (Spanish: Refugio de Vida Silvestre Werner Sauter), is a protected area in Costa Rica, managed under the Tempisque Conservation Area, it was created in 1995 by executive decree 24345-MIRENEM.
