= Caletas-Ario Mixed Wildlife Refuge =

Protected area in Costa Rica

- Refugio de Vida Silvestre Mixto Caletas-Ario
- Location within Costa Rica
- Location: Costa Rica
- Coordinates: 9.660°N 85.310°W
- Area: 3.59 square kilometres (1.39 sq mi) (terrestrial), 199.33 square kilometres (76.96 sq mi) (marine)
- Established: 11 August 2006
- Governing body: National System of Conservation Areas (SINAC)

Caletas-Ario Mixed Wildlife Refuge (Spanish: Refugio de Vida Silvestre Mixto Caletas-Ario), is a protected area in Costa Rica, managed under the Tempisque Conservation Area, it was created in 2006 by decree 33232-MINAE.
