= Las Baulas de Guanacaste Protected Zone =

Protected area in Costa Rica

- Zona Protectora Las Baulas de Guanacaste
- Location within Costa Rica
- Location: Costa Rica
- Coordinates: 10.345°N 85.855°W
- Area: 0.16 square kilometres (0.062 sq mi)
- Established: 5 June 1991
- Governing body: National System of Conservation Areas (SINAC)

Las Baulas de Guanacaste Protected Zone (Spanish: Zona Protectora Las Baulas de Guanacaste), is a protected area in Costa Rica, managed under the Tempisque Conservation Area, it was created in 1991 by decree 20518-MIRENEM.
