= Chora Island Wildlife Refuge =

Protected area in Costa Rica

- Refugio de Vida Silvestre Isla Chora
- Location within Costa Rica
- Location: Costa Rica
- Coordinates: 9.862°N 85.514°W
- Area: 0.06 square kilometres (0.023 sq mi)
- Established: 2 October 2002
- Governing body: National System of Conservation Areas (SINAC)

Chora Island Wildlife Refuge (Spanish: Refugio de Vida Silvestre Isla Chora), is a protected area in Costa Rica, managed under the Tempisque Conservation Area, it was created in 2002 by decree 30719-MINAE.
