= Conchal Wildlife Refuge =

Protected area in Costa Rica

- Refugio de Vida Silvestre Conchal
- Location within Costa Rica
- Location: Costa Rica
- Coordinates: 10.396°N 85.813°W
- Area: 0.40 square kilometres (0.15 sq mi)
- Established: 8 May 2009
- Governing body: National System of Conservation Areas (SINAC)

Conchal Wildlife Refuge (Spanish: Refugio de Vida Silvestre Conchal), is a protected area in Costa Rica, managed under the Tempisque Conservation Area, it was created in 2009 by decree 35426-MINAE.
