= Negritos Islands Biological Reserve =

Nature reserve of Costa Rica

- Islas Negritos Biological Reserve
- IUCN category Ia (strict nature reserve)
- Location within Costa Rica
- Location: Guanacaste Province, Costa Rica
- Coordinates: 9°49′23″N 84°50′44″W
- Area: 350 acres (1.4 km^{2})
- Established: 1982
- Governing body: National System of Conservation Areas (SINAC)

The Negritos Islands Biological Reserve is a nature reserve of Costa Rica, part of the Tempisque Conservation Area, containing two islands separated by a small channel in the Gulf of Nicoya which protects migratory bird species which use the island seasonally.
