= Tempisque Conservation Area =

Conservation area in Costa Rica

- Área de Conservación Tempisque
- Location of the area, labeled ACT in the northwest of the country.
- Location: Puntarenas Province, Guanacaste Province, Costa Rica
- Coordinates: 10.01°N 85.38°W
- Governing body: National System of Conservation Areas (SINAC)
- Website: Tempisque Conservation Area

Tempisque Conservation Area is an administrative area which is managed by SINAC for the purposes of conservation in the western part of Costa Rica, including the Tempisque River valley and the Nicoya Peninsula. It contains a number of National Parks, Wildlife refuges and Forest Reserves.

== Geography ==
It is located in the northwestern part of Costa Rica. It includes the Nicoya Peninsula.

== Protected areas ==
- Barra Honda National Park
- Cabo Blanco Absolute Natural Reserve
- Cabo Blanco Marine Management Area
- Caletas-Ario Mixed Wildlife Refuge
- Camaronal Wildlife Refuge
- Cañas River Lacustrine Wetland
- Chora Island Wildlife Refuge
- Cipancí Wildlife Refuge
- Conchal Wildlife Refuge
- Corral de Piedra Palustrine Wetland
- Curú Wildlife Refuge
- Diriá National Park
- Guayabo Island Biological Reserve
- Iguanita Wildlife Refuge
- La Cruz Hill Protected Zone
- Las Baulas de Guanacaste Protected Zone
- Las Baulas Marine National Park
- Mata Redonda Wildlife Refuge
- Monte Alto Protected Zone
- Negritos Islands Biological Reserve
- Nicolas Wessberg Absolute Natural Reserve
- Nicoya Peninsula Protected Zone
- Ostional Mixed Wildlife Refuge
- Romelia Wildlife Refuge
- Werner Sauter Wildlife Refuge
- Zapandí Riverine Wetlands
