= Ballena Marine National Park =

National park of Costa Rica

- IUCN category II (national park)
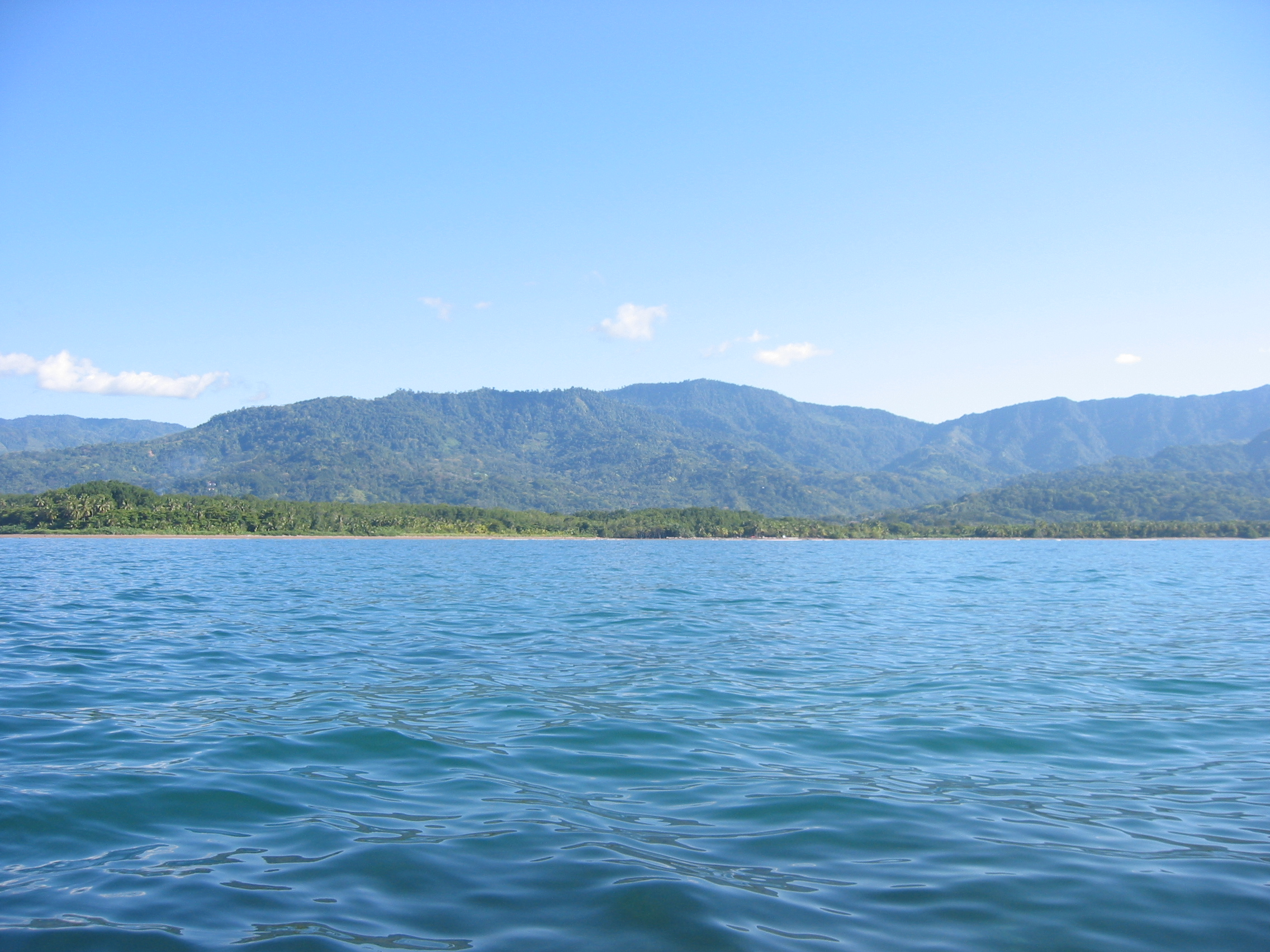
- View of the marine park
- Location within Costa Rica
- Location: Puntarenas Province, Costa Rica
- Nearest city: San Isidro de El General
- Coordinates: 9°09′21″N 83°45′17″W
- Area: 5,160 ha (12,800 acres) marine 171 ha (420 acres) terrestrial.
- Established: 9 June 1992
- Governing body: National System of Conservation Areas (SINAC)
- Website: www.sinac.go.cr/ES/ac/acosa/pnmb/Paginas/default.aspx
- Location in Costa Rica

Ballena Marine National Park (Spanish: Parque Nacional Marino Ballena), is a national park of Costa Rica, part of the Osa Conservation Area created as a safe area for migration of humpback whales, hence its name, as Ballena is the Spanish word for whale.

The national park has an area of 5,160 ha (12,800 acres) marine, and 171 ha (420 acres) terrestrial. The park was created by executive decree Nº 21294-MIRENEM on 9 June 1992.

From December to April, the park is visited by migrating humpback whales who come to breed in the warmer tropical waters off the Central American coast. From June to November, the whales migrate north to the West Coast of the United States and southern British Columbia, where they feed.

In the terrestrial area of the park are the Ballena beach, Uvita bay beach, and Piñuela beach.
