= Barra Honda National Park =

National park in western Costa Rica

- IUCN category II (national park)
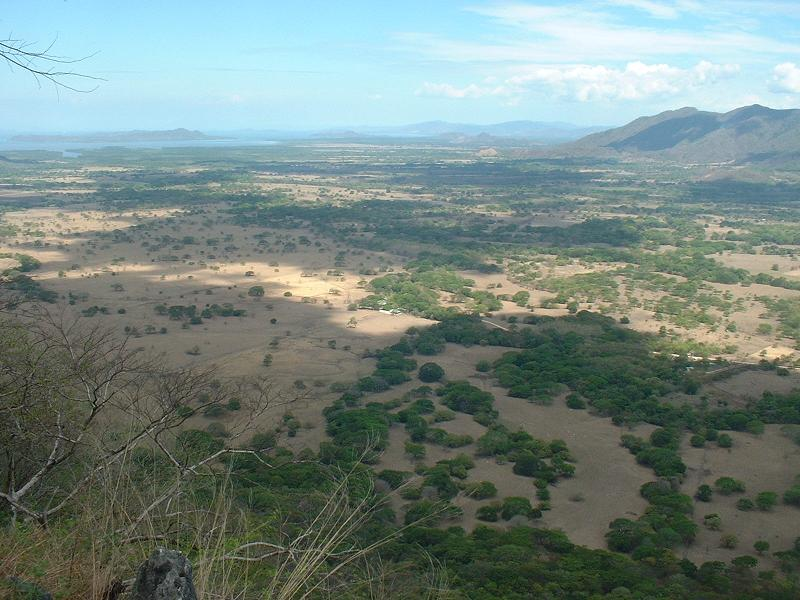
- View towards Nicoya Gulf from the Barra Honda viewpoint.
- Barra Honda National Park area.
- Location: Costa Rica
- Nearest city: Nicoya
- Coordinates: 10°10′30″N 85°20′00″W
- Area: 23 km^{2} (8.9 sq mi)
- Established: 1974
- Governing body: National System of Conservation Areas (SINAC)
- Location in Costa Rica

Barra Honda National Park is a national park in the western part of Costa Rica, which forms part of the Tempisque Conservation Area about 12 km (7.5 mi) from the Tempisque River. The national park was created in 1974 to protect its famous cave systems, under the Barra Honda Peak which was formed when islets from the Miocene Era were raised above the plains of the river. The caves and waterways there today were then carved out by the action of rain filtering through the limestone over 70 million years or more.

The park receives an annual rainfall of 1,970 mm and has an average annual temperature of 28 °C (82.4 °F).

The calcareous formations of the limestone caverns at the park are the main visitor attraction, which are only estimated to be 50% explored. The park has a Ranger Station which is open for visitor attention from 8am to dusk, and has potable water and restrooms.

The number of caves discovered on Barra Honda Peak was 42 in 2005, which were rediscovered during the 1960s and 1970s. They include Nicoa, where pre-Columbian human remains, artifacts and jewelry were found dated to approximately 300 BC, and Santa Ana, the deepest cave known in the complex which is unusual for its unique and numerous stalactites and columns. This cave plunges some 240 m (790 ft) into the earth. Various colonies of bats roost within the cavern system.

Due to its unique underground features, the park is also home to several rare species. These include blind salamanders and endemic fish that have adapted to living in complete darkness.

In March 1997 approximately five percent of the park was devastated by a fire, several other national parks in that same year were also affected. Costa Rica's National Commission of Forest Fires (CONIFOR) reported that efforts to suppress fires were hampered by smoke obscuring locations that were in danger of getting out of control, as well as problems with communication and transport and an overall lack of firefighting equipment. On June 11, 1997, an OFDA funded commercial flight carrying appropriate tools and equipment was sent to several nations hit by similar fires in the region, the cargo being funded by a grant from the USFS towards fire suppression efforts.
