= Diriá National Park =

National park in Costa Rica

- IUCN category II (national park)
- Location: Costa Rica
- Coordinates: 10°10′23″N 85°35′37″W
- Area: 28 km^{2} (11 mi^{2})
- Established: 1991
- Governing body: National System of Conservation Areas (SINAC)
- Location in Costa Rica

Diriá National Park, until 2004 Diriá National Forest Wildlife Refuge, is a national park south of Santa Cruz in the Guanacaste Province in Costa Rica, and is part of the Tempisque Conservation Area.

== History ==
It was created as a protected zone by presidential decree on 9 July 1991, a national wildlife refuge two years later, and finally a national park in 2004.

In April 2015, wildfires consumed nearly half of the park. The authorities suspect that they were started by local hunters who, when the rainy season starts, use fires to clear areas to attract animals.

== Geography ==
The park occupies 5,549 hectares (13,710 acres), per the official SINAC park boundary map. in the central highlands of the Nicoya Peninsula, including the watersheds of the Diriá, Tigre, Verde and Enmedio rivers, which has created a terrain of deep valleys with steep slopes.

== Flora and fauna ==
The park contains tropical and cloud forests. It shelters species such as deer, howler monkeys, anteaters and peccaries, as well as over 140 species of birds. There are also at least 382 plant species.

== Tourism ==
According to the Sistema Nacional de Áreas de Conservación (National System of Conservation Areas), there have been only 4336 visitors from 2012 to 2016. Attempts are being made to make the park more of an attraction.

The park has a ranger station which is open daily from 8 am to 4 pm for visitors. There are two trails that leave the ranger station, one of which leads to the Brasil Waterfall, which only flows during the rainy season. There is a basic dormitory at the ranger station where travelers can stay overnight.
