= El Guayabo River =

El Guayabo
- Location of mouth

Location
- Country: El Salvador
- Department: San Vicente

Physical characteristics
- Source
  - location: El Playón, Tecoluca, San Vicente
  - coordinates: 13°19′00″N 88°47′00″W
- Mouth
  - location: Lempa River, El Playón, Tecoluca, San Vicente
  - coordinates: 13°16′00″N 88°50′01″W

El Guayabo River (Rio El Guayabo) is a medium stream in El Salvador, with a moderate to large flow of fresh water year-round, especially from early May through October.
