= Guayabos =

Barrio of Isabela, Puerto Rico

- Barrio
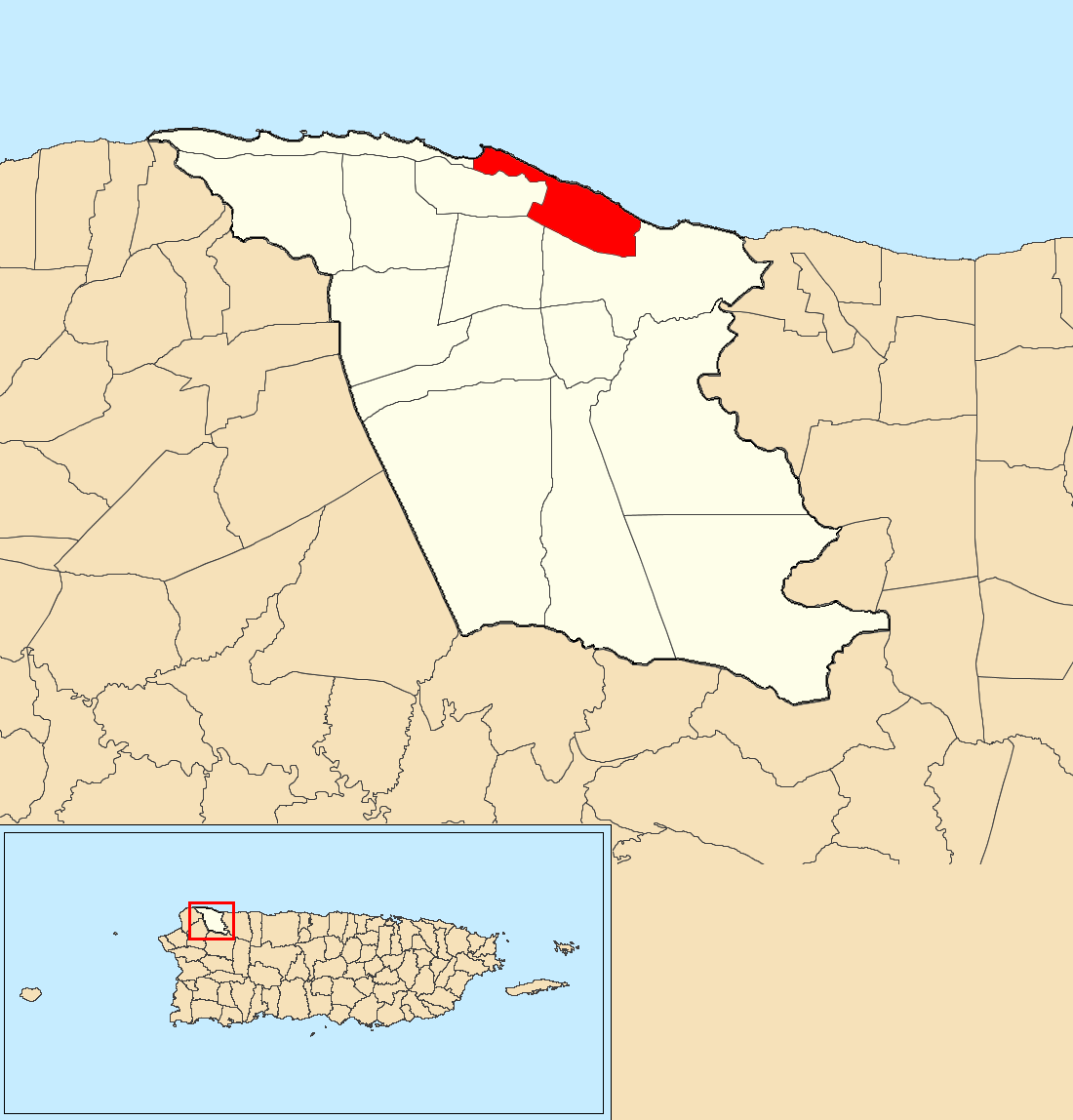
- Location of Guayabos within the municipality of Isabela shown in red

- Location of Puerto Rico
- Coordinates: 18°29′45″N 66°59′43″W
- Commonwealth: Puerto Rico
- Municipality: Isabela

Area
  - Total: 2.89 sq mi (7.5 km^{2})
  - Land: 1.75 sq mi (4.5 km^{2})
  - Water: 1.14 sq mi (3.0 km^{2})
- Elevation: 184 ft (56 m)

Population (2010)
  - Total: 1,475
  - Density: 842.9/sq mi (325.4/km^{2})
- Source: 2010 Census
- Time zone: UTC−4 (AST)

Guayabos is a barrio in the municipality of Isabela, Puerto Rico. Its population in 2010 was 1,475.

== History ==
Guayabos was in Spain's gazetteers until Puerto Rico was ceded by Spain in the aftermath of the Spanish–American War under the terms of the Treaty of Paris of 1898 and became an unincorporated territory of the United States. In 1899, the United States Department of War conducted a census of Puerto Rico finding that the population of Guayabos barrio was 818.

Historical population
Census	Pop.	Note	%±
1900	818		—
1910	779		−4.8%
1920	846		8.6%
1930	900		6.4%
1940	1,018		13.1%
1950	821		−19.4%
1960	717		−12.7%
1970	894		24.7%
1980	1,134		26.8%
1990	1,248		10.1%
2000	1,426		14.3%
2010	1,475		3.4%
U.S. Decennial Census; 1899 (shown as 1900) 1910-1930; 1930-1950 1980-2000 2010

== See also ==
- List of communities in Puerto Rico
