= Conservation International Costa Rica =

Costa Rica programme of Conservation International

- Fundación Conservación Internacional - Costa Rica
- Abbreviation: CI Costa Rica
- Formation: 1988
- Type: Non-profit foundation; country programme
- Headquarters: Los Yoses, San Pedro, San José Province, Costa Rica
- Region served: Costa Rica
- Fields: Oceans; coastal and marine conservation; marine spatial planning; climate resilience
- Parent organization: Conservation International
- Website: www.conservation.org/places/costa-rica

Conservation International Costa Rica (CI Costa Rica) is the country programme of Conservation International in Costa Rica. CI Costa Rica is organized as a non-profit foundation (Fundación Conservación Internacional - Costa Rica), established in 1988 and based in Los Yoses, San Pedro, San José Province.

The programme works on marine and coastal conservation initiatives in Costa Rica, including marine spatial planning and projects related to mangrove ecosystems and offshore marine protected areas.

== Overview ==
CI Costa Rica's work includes ocean and coastal conservation planning and marine spatial planning, including initiatives linked to the Eastern Tropical Pacific seascape and marine protected areas.

CI Costa Rica participates in the Transforma-Innova (TRANSFORMA) programme, a multi-partner initiative implemented by Deutsche Gesellschaft für Internationale Zusammenarbeit (GIZ) and focused on shifting agriculture, livestock and marine-coastal systems toward low-carbon and climate-resilient practices.

It also implements a blue carbon pilot project linked to Costa Rica's National Blue Carbon Strategy and Action Plan, with field work focused on mangroves in the Gulf of Nicoya.

In 2009, National Geographic Pristine Seas and partners including Conservation International conducted a marine expedition to Cocos Island National Park and nearby seamounts to establish scientific baselines, and surveys from the expedition were later analysed in peer-reviewed studies of fish assemblages and deepwater communities around the island. Costa Rica created the Área Marina de Manejo Montes Submarinos in 2011, and an executive decree expanded and modified the marine boundaries of Cocos Island National Park in 2021, increasing the protected marine area from 1,997 km^{2} to 54,844 km^{2}.

== History ==
The local operating entity for CI Costa Rica was established in 1988 as a non-profit foundation and is based in Los Yoses, San Pedro, San José Province.

In 2009, National Geographic Pristine Seas and partners including Conservation International conducted a marine expedition to Cocos Island National Park and nearby seamounts to establish scientific baselines for the area; results from surveys conducted during the expedition were later analysed in peer-reviewed studies of shallow-water fish assemblages and deepwater communities around the island and adjacent seamounts.

Costa Rica created the Área Marina de Manejo Montes Submarinos by executive decree in 2011, and a 2021 executive decree expanded and modified the marine boundaries of Cocos Island National Park, increasing the protected marine area from 1,997 km^{2} to 54,844 km^{2} and reforming earlier offshore governance decrees. In the 2020s, CI Costa Rica participated in the Transforma-Innova (TRANSFORMA) programme. It began implementing a blue carbon pilot project focused on mangroves in the Gulf of Nicoya in 2025.

== Programmes and operations ==
Selected programme locations in Costa Rica and the eastern Pacific (1 San Pedro; 2 Gulf of Nicoya; 3 Cocos Island National Park)

=== San José Province ===
CI Costa Rica is based in Los Yoses, San Pedro de Montes de Oca, in San José Province. From its base in the Greater San José area, the programme has supported marine and coastal conservation planning initiatives in Costa Rica, including work described as marine spatial planning linked to the Eastern Tropical Pacific seascape and marine protected areas.

CI Costa Rica participates in the Transforma-Innova (TRANSFORMA) programme, a multi-partner climate-resilience and low-carbon transition project implemented by GIZ. Participation includes working as part of a consortium with partners including CATIE, FUNBAM, UNDP and the CRUSA Foundation.

=== Gulf of Nicoya ===
A blue carbon pilot project led by CI Costa Rica focuses on mangroves in the Gulf of Nicoya and is linked to Costa Rica's National Blue Carbon Strategy and Action Plan. The project is implemented in coordination with the National System of Conservation Areas (SINAC) and includes baseline assessments and field activities intended to support mangrove conservation and restoration.

In February 2023, SINAC–MINAE presented an official national mangrove ecosystem map for 2021, developed with Conservación Internacional Costa Rica and with technical input from CATIE. Mangrove maps provide a baseline showing where mangrove ecosystems are located and are used to help target restoration activities and support monitoring of change over time.

The National System of Conservation Areas (SINAC) set out a regional strategy for mangrove management and conservation in the Gulf of Nicoya (2019-2030), developed with technical work by CATIE and technical review by CI Costa Rica staff.

Transforma-Innova field activities in Puntarenas Province have included mangrove restoration in the communities of La Pitahaya and El Establo, including community-led channel restoration intended to reconnect mangrove areas to estuarine waters; consortium partners including Conservación Internacional support this work. Mangrove protection and restoration work in Costa Rica has included cooperation with coastal communities and restoration protocols designed to support long-term sustainability. In 2018, Conservation International supported community-based mangrove restoration work that included livelihoods-related activities connected to mangrove-associated fisheries products such as crabs and clams.

=== Cocos Island National Park ===
In 2009, National Geographic Pristine Seas and partners including Conservation International conducted a marine expedition to Cocos Island National Park to establish scientific baselines for ecosystems and nearby seamounts; expedition work included tagging sharks and sea turtles, measuring the abundance of reef fishes and sharks, and conducting surveys of seamounts around the island. Surveys from the expedition were later analysed in studies reporting predator-dominated shallow-water fish assemblages at Cocos Island and deepwater fish communities in the park and at nearby seamounts (Las Gemelas). Research at Cocos Island has also examined elasmobranch community composition and reported shifts in assemblage structure over time within the context of an offshore marine protected area. A telemetry study of scalloped hammerhead sharks around Cocos Island reported funding support from Conservation International - Costa Rica, among other organisations.

Costa Rica created the Área Marina de Manejo Montes Submarinos in 2011, and an executive decree in December 2021 expanded and modified the marine boundaries of Cocos Island National Park, increasing the protected marine area from 1,997 km^{2} to 54,844 km^{2}. The 2021 decree also referred to offshore governance measures for seamount ecosystems under earlier decrees. An Oryx case study analysed enforcement and compliance in offshore marine protected areas using Cocos Island as a case study.

Selected marine and coastal programme locations of Conservation International Costa Rica
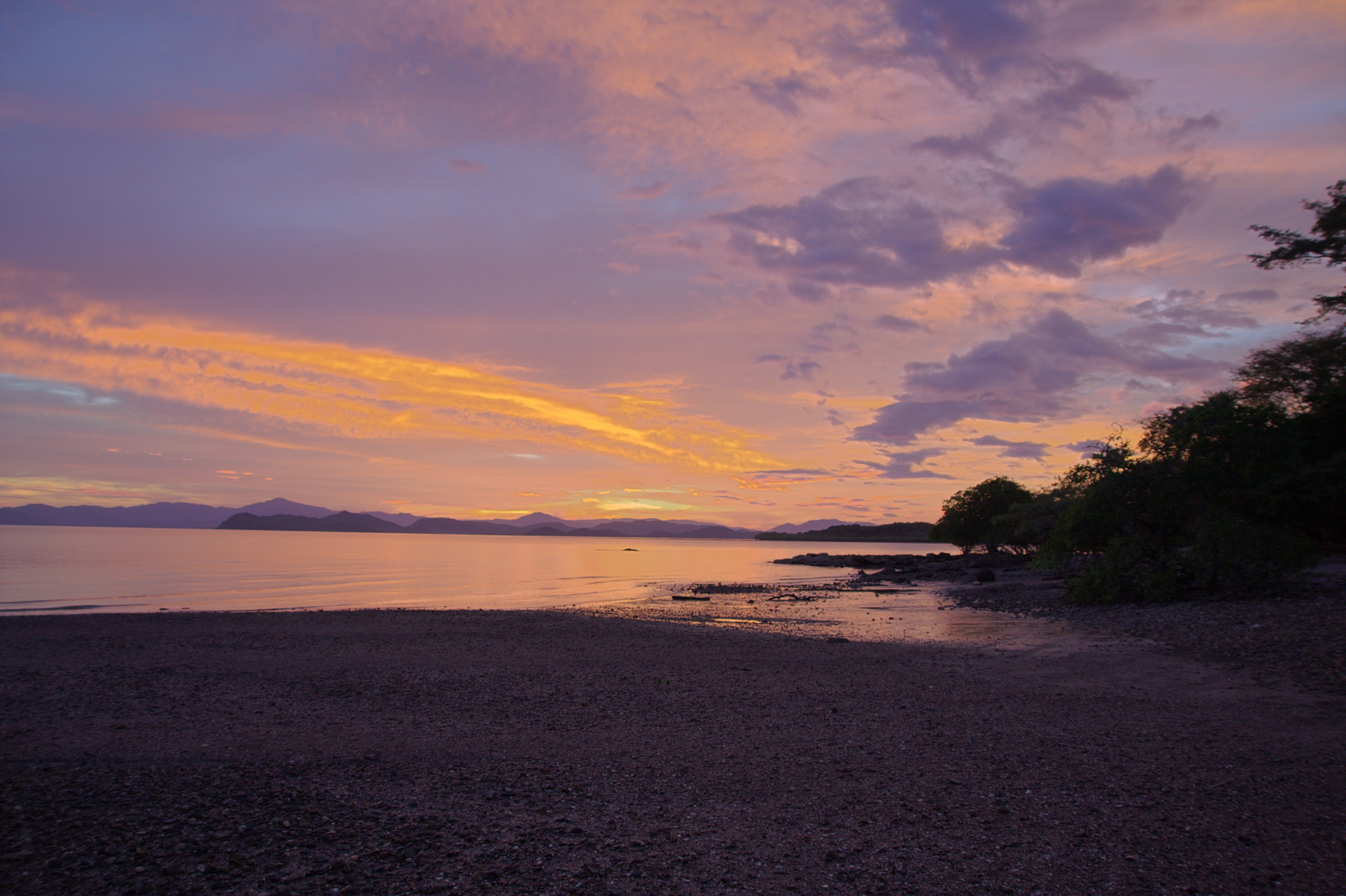
The Gulf of Nicoya, where CI Costa Rica has implemented blue-carbon and mangrove work

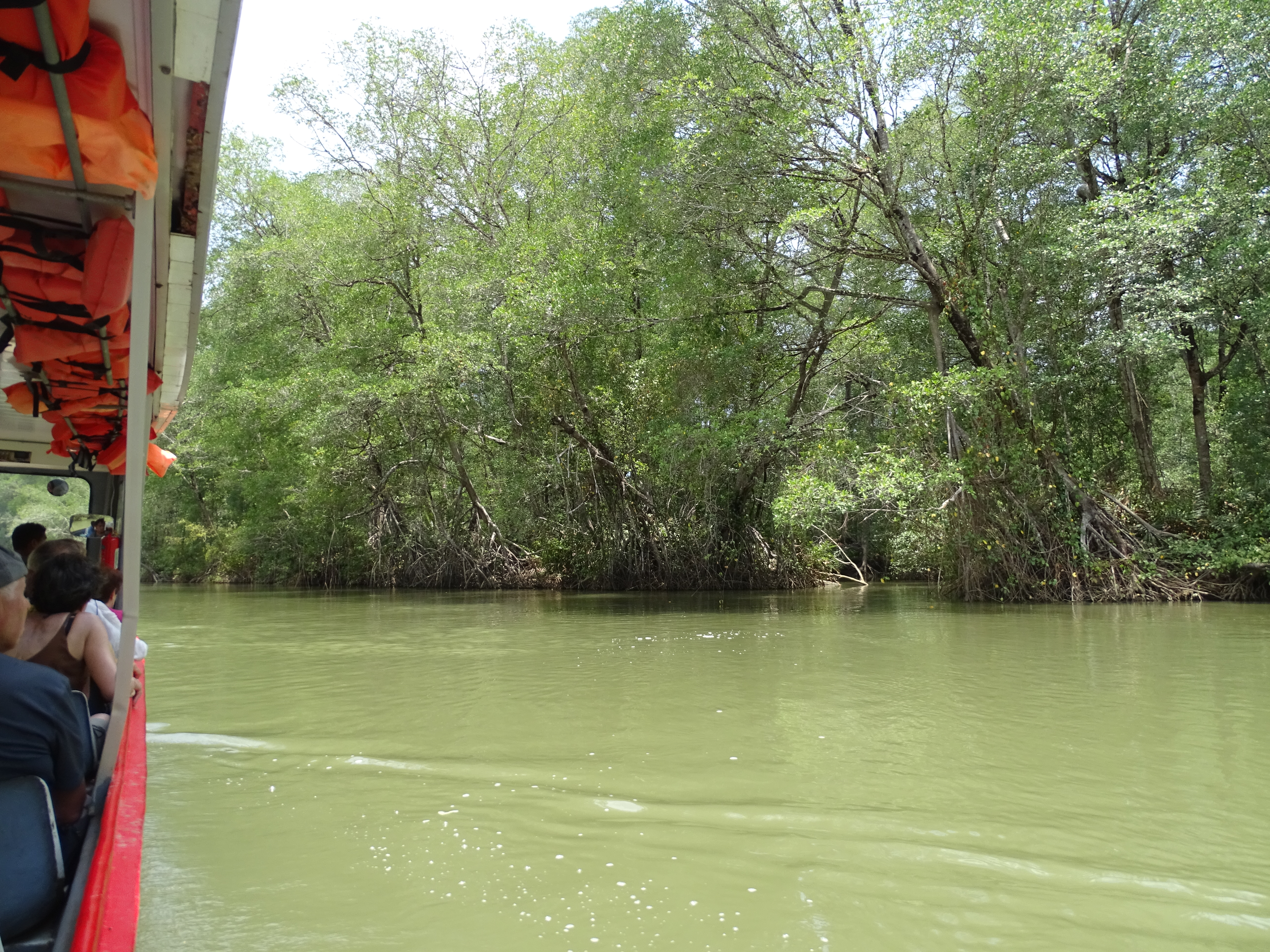
Mangroves at the mouth of the Tárcoles River on Costa Rica's Pacific coast

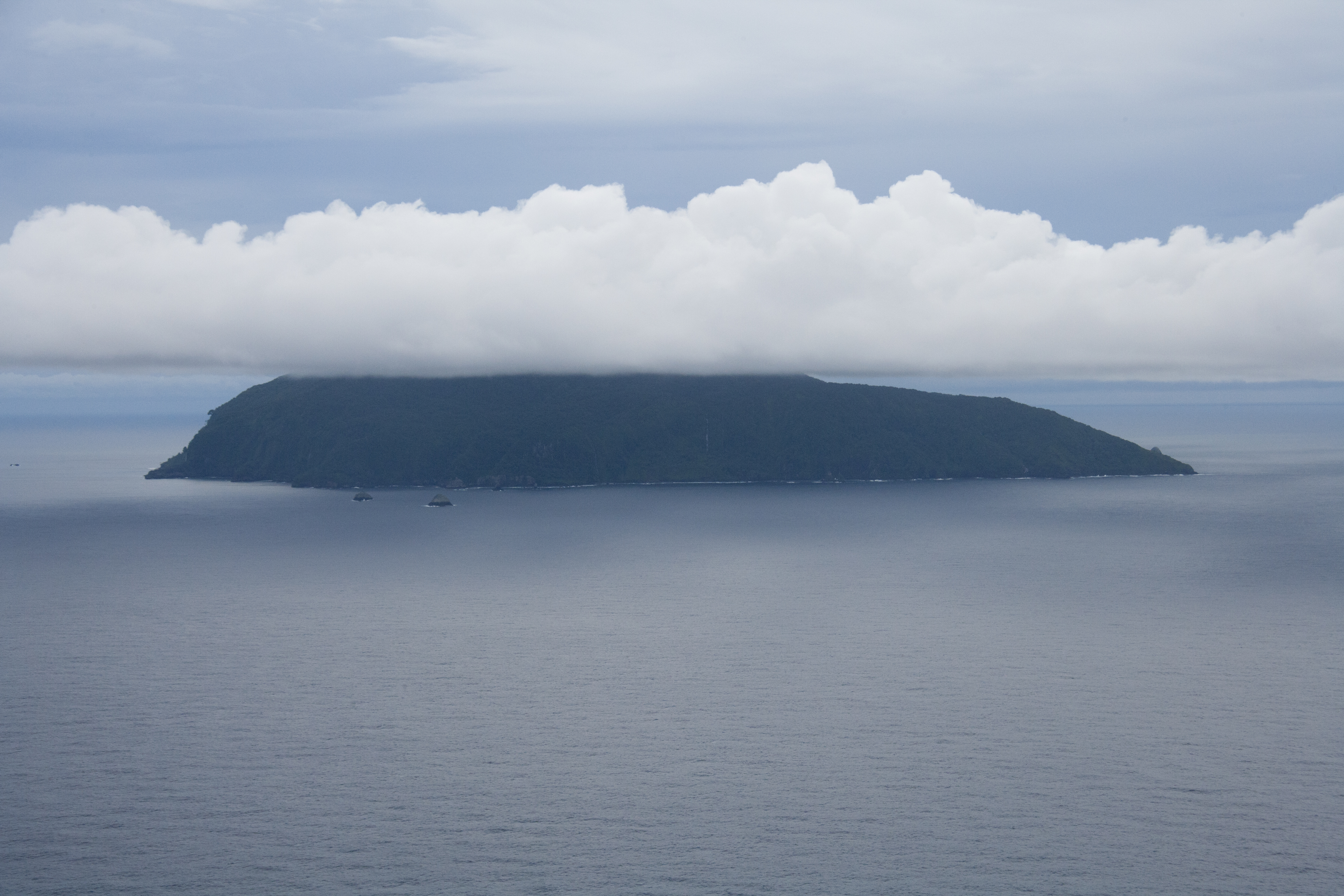
Cocos Island National Park

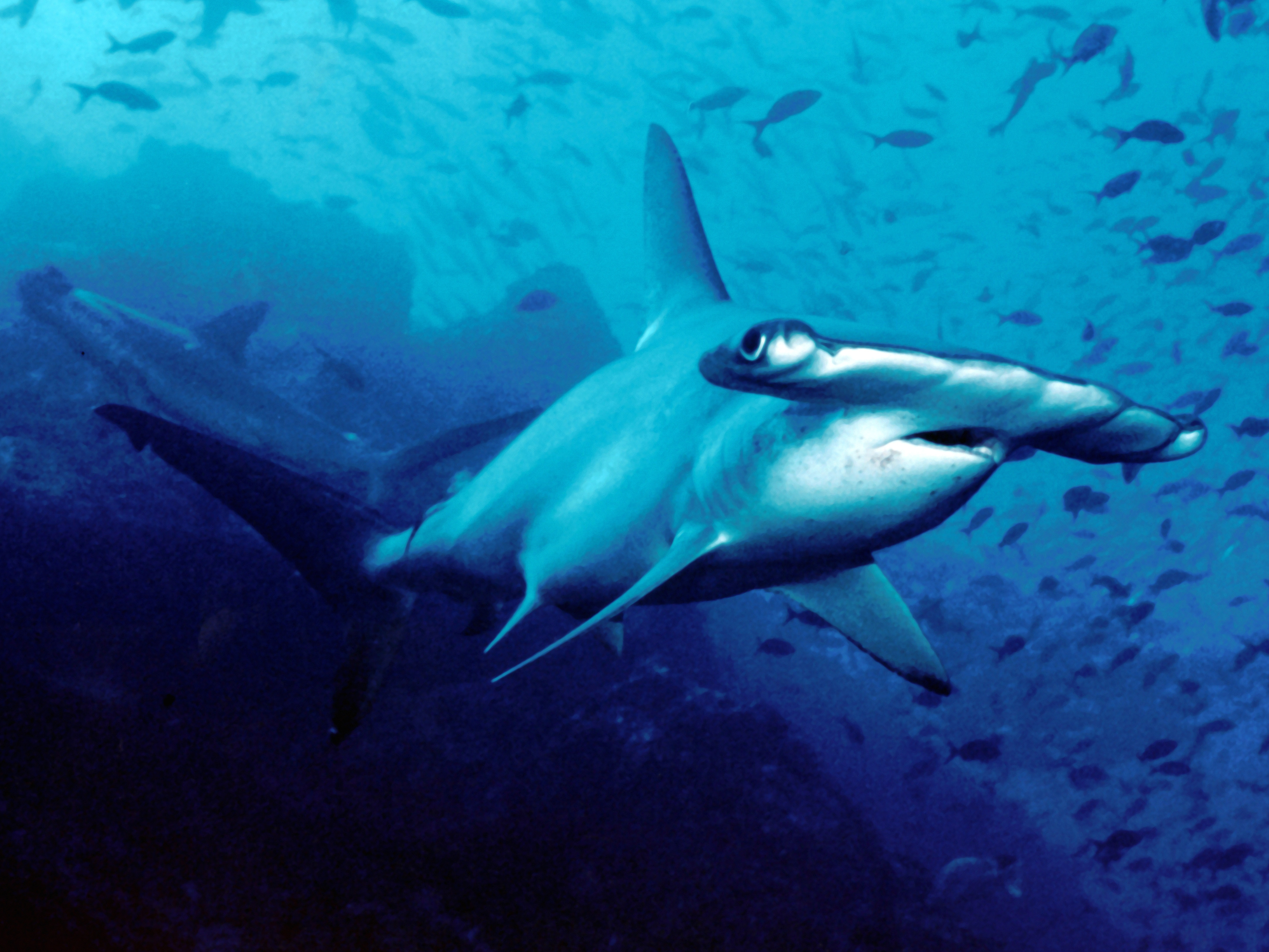
Scalloped hammerheads off Cocos Island

== Partnerships ==
CI Costa Rica participates in the Transforma-Innova (TRANSFORMA) programme implemented by Deutsche Gesellschaft für Internationale Zusammenarbeit (GIZ) as part of a consortium that includes CATIE, Conservation International Costa Rica, Fundación Banco Ambiental (FUNBAM), UNDP and the CRUSA Foundation.

A blue carbon pilot project is implemented by CI Costa Rica in coordination with the National System of Conservation Areas (SINAC), with support from Agence française de développement (AFD). The 2009 marine expedition to Cocos Island National Park conducted by National Geographic Pristine Seas involved partner organisations including FAICO, Costa Rica Por Siempre, Marviva, The Nature Conservancy, Conservation International, Pretoma and the University of Costa Rica.

== Funding and conservation finance ==
The blue carbon pilot project in the Gulf of Nicoya is financed through the Blue Carbon Facility of Agence française de développement (AFD) as a grant of €700,000 for May 2025–May 2027. The project aims to explore and pilot financing mechanisms including carbon credits, payments for marine ecosystem services, and biodiversity credits, with field testing focused on mangroves in the Gulf of Nicoya. In this context, blue carbon refers to carbon captured and stored by ocean and coastal ecosystems such as mangroves. Ecosystem services are the benefits people obtain from ecosystems.

Transforma-Innova (TRANSFORMA) is described as a multi-donor programme with funding that includes a €12.3 million contribution from Germany's Federal Ministry for the Environment, Nature Conservation, Nuclear Safety and Consumer Protection (BMUV) and a €4.1 million contribution from the European Union. The GIZ project profile lists a financial commitment of €16,462,000 and EU co-financing of €4.15 million. The programme includes a climate finance component intended to help mobilise additional financing for low-emission and climate-resilient investments in agriculture and marine-coastal systems; one stated target is raising at least US$10 million in additional climate finance.

== Impact and evaluation ==
A mid-term evaluation of the Transforma project was published in 2024 and assessed the project's implementation status and likelihood of achieving its objectives.

The evaluation described the project as aligned with Costa Rica's Decarbonization Plan and associated climate policies. It reported that the project's theory of change lacked clear causal pathways and that its results framework was not operational. It stated that, as of March 2024, financial execution had reached 31% of allocated funds and that performance against output indicators was significantly delayed.
