= National System of Conservation Areas =

Government agency in Costa Rica

Logo of SINAC

National System of Conservation Areas (Spanish: Sistema Nacional de Áreas de Conservación, SINAC) is part of the Ministry of Environment and Energy (MINAE) of Costa Rica. It is the administrator for the nation's national parks, conservation areas, and other protected natural areas.

Created in 1994, it combined three previously separate organisations that had managed laws relating to national parks, wildlife, and forestry.

== Scope ==
SINAC oversees over 160 protected areas, of which 30 are designated National Parks. Other areas are designated wildlife refuges, biological reserves, national monuments, forest reserves, national wetlands, and protected zones.

The entire country of 12,596,690 acres (50,977 km²) is under the jurisdiction of eleven large Conservation Areas which were created in 1998, overseen by divisions of SINAC. Over 25% of the national territory, i.e. 3,221,636 acres (13,037 km²) is included in the national parks, refuges, and protected zones within these eleven Conservation Areas.

Costa Rica's progressive policies on environmental protection and sustainable eco-tourism in the National Parks System have been lauded as a model for other countries. The rainforests, tropical forests, marine areas and wetlands of Costa Rica are the subject of many university and scientific organization studies. The enrichment of the world's knowledge of these important habitats is an invaluable contribution from the conservation efforts of the various organisations involved.

In the Gulf of Nicoya, SINAC set out a regional strategy for mangrove management and conservation (2019–2030) developed with technical work by CATIE and technical review by Conservation International Costa Rica.

== Conservation areas ==
Location of Conservation Areas

- Arenal Huetar Norte (ACAHN): Arenal Volcano, Juan Castro Blanco National Park, Refugio Nacional de Vida Silvestre Mixto Caño Negro, Refugio Nacional de Vida Silvestre Maquenque.
- Arenal Tempisque (ACAT): Tenorio Volcano, Palo Verde
- Central (ACC): Guayabo National Monument, Braulio Carrillo, La Cangreja, Los Quetzales, Tapantí, Irazú Volcano, Poás Volcano, Turrialba Volcano. Reserva Biológica Alberto Manuel Brenes, Reserva Forestal Grecia (Bosque del Niño).
- Guanacaste (ACG): Rincón de la Vieja, Santa Rosa, Guanacaste National Park.
- La Amistad Caribe (ACLAC): Cahuita, Barbilla
- La Amistad-Pacífico (ACLAP): La Amistad International Park which is shared with Panama, Chirripó
- Cocos Marine (ACMC): Cocos Island National Park
- Osa (ACOSA): Corcovado, Ballena National Marine Park, Piedras Blancas.
- Pacífico Central (ACOPAC): Carara, Manuel Antonio.
- Tempisque (ACT): Barra Honda, Las Baulas, Diriá National Park
- Tortuguero (ACTo): Tortuguero National Park, Refugio de Vida Silvestre Barra del Colorado

== See also ==
- List of national parks of Costa Rica
