= Qöyawayma =

Qöyawayma is a surname. Notable people with the surname include:

- Al Qöyawayma (born 1938), Hopi potter
- Polingaysi Qöyawayma (1892–1990), Hopi educator
