= La Fortuna Waterfall (Costa Rica) =

Waterfall in Costa Rica

- (es) Catarata Fortuna
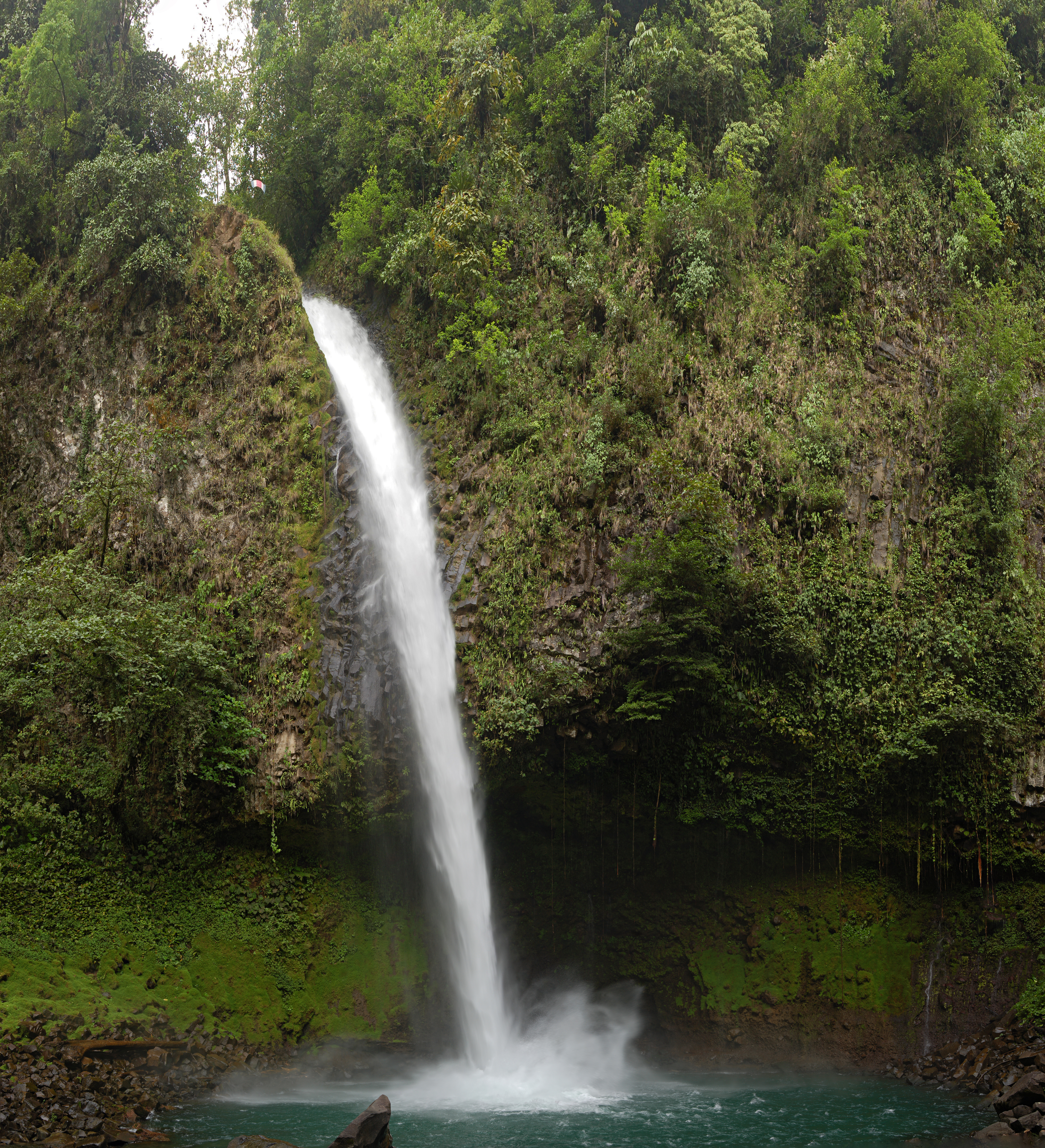
- La Fortuna Waterfall in 2006
- Interactive map of La Fortuna Waterfall
- Location: La Fortuna, Alajuela Province, Costa Rica
- Coordinates: 10°26′53.15″N 84°40′05.72″W
- Total height: 70–75 m (230–246 ft)
- Number of drops: 1
- Watercourse: Fortuna River

La Fortuna Waterfall (Spanish for "the fortune") is in north-central Costa Rica, in Arenal Volcano National Park in the Alajuela Province. In Spanish, it is known as Catarata Fortuna. The waterfall drops about 70−75 meters and is at the base of the dormant Chato volcano, about 5.5 km outside of the town of La Fortuna, near the Arenal Volcano. It is fed by the Fortuna River, which travels through the rain forest in the Arenal Mountain range until it plunges over the cliff, forming this waterfall.

The admission is $20 for foreign adults, $9 for Costa Rican adults, and $0 for any children under 8. The paved hike down to the waterfall is over 500 steps along a staircase carved into the hillside. It takes about 10-20 minutes, and there are places to stop and sit if needed. Guests are encouraged to swim in the stream and small rapids below the falls, and there's a lifeguard on duty. There are restrooms and showers in the guest facilities atop the cliff, along with a restaurant and gift shop. It should take 10 minutes to go down and about 20 to get back up to the parking lot. Open from 7:30 am to 4:00 pm.

== See also ==
- List of waterfalls
