= Arenal Hanging Bridges =

Bridge in Costa Rica

Arenal Hanging Bridges (Earth)

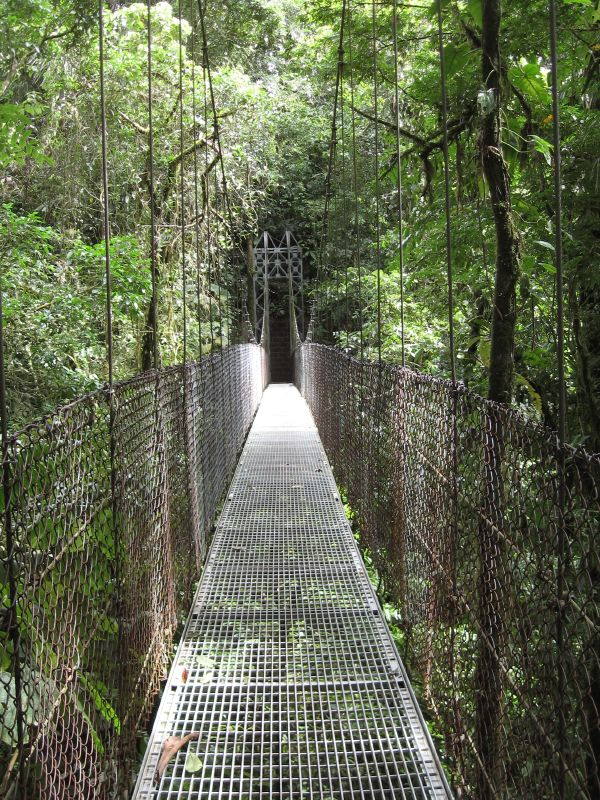

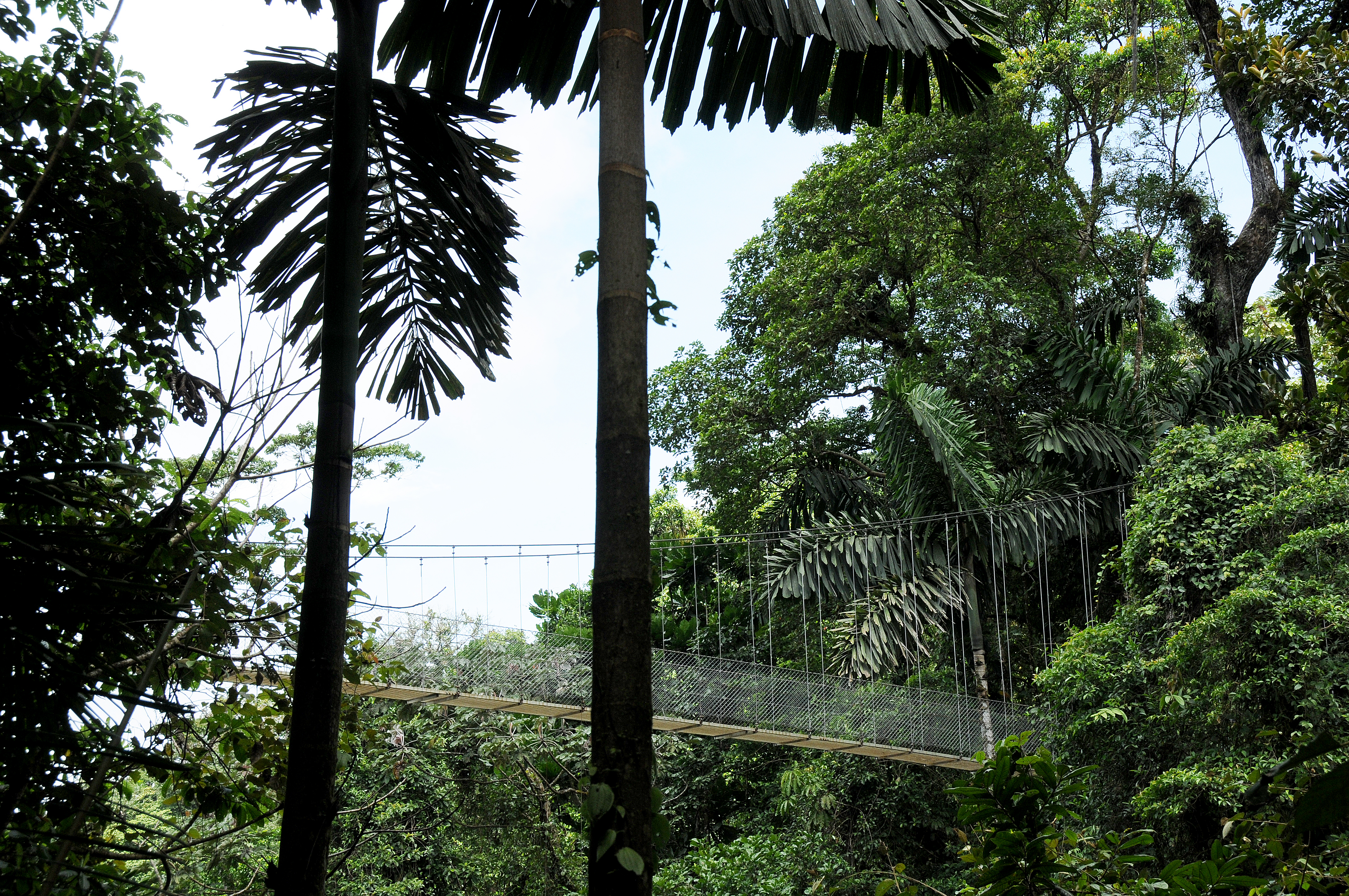
A view of hanging bridge at Mistico Park

The Arenal Hanging Bridges (Mistico Park) are a series of suspension bridges in the Volcan Arenal National Park area, located in the country of Costa Rica, offering views of Lake Arenal and Volcan Arenal. The bridges form part of a 2-mile (3 kilometre) self-guided interpretive trail through a private rainforest reserve. Místico Arenal Hanging Bridges Park is located on the Arenal fault in a tropical transition wet forest. It is located at 600 m. above sea level, and it concentrates 250 ha of mature forest, with an annual rainfall of 3.500-6.000 m.m. and a relative humidity of 88-92%. The trail is 3 km and allows tourists to walk on 15 bridges; 6 of which are hanging. This is a highly diverse forest since it lies between the boundary of highland and lowland forest, integrating species from both areas.

Through years of evolution, flora of the lowland rainforest, typical from Sarapiquí and Tortuguero, had an altitudinal migration to 500–600 m high, and flora of the highlands did not descent to less than 300 m.

At Místico Arenal Hanging Bridges Park, the junction between the two types of ecosystems forming a transitional vegetation strip with high biodiversity occurred. In this park, it is possible to observe highland bird species, such as bellbirds, and species of trees such as yema huevo, cirri and pilón. Lowland species (such as toucans and crested guans) and trees such as caobilla, fruta dorada and maquenque are also observable.

The treetop is a diverse and almost unknown environment to science; it is a space that offers a completely different perspective than the one seen from the ground, with various species of epiphytic plants, birds and butterflies.

Walking at that height allows the observation of more species, more closely. It also allows appreciating the shape of trees, flowers and vegetable structures that emerge above the canopy. Along the tour, a variety of flora and fauna in the understory and overstory is visible. This forest has been affected by acid rain and ash fall from Arenal Volcano for thousands of years. The flora has certain modifications: there are lithophytes and species associated to andisols, acidic soils of volcanic origin.

Over 700 species of flora can be found in the area. Fauna has a high biodiversity and it is part of a biological corridor that connects the Guanacaste Volcanic Range with Tilarán Volcanic Range. Místico Arenal Hanging Bridges Park is the only biological corridor that allows the flow of large mammals or megafauna like the puma, jaguar and tapir around both ranges.

Místico Arenal Hanging Bridges Park is ideal for hiking and wildlife observation. It shelters more than 700 species, including trees, lianas, epiphytes and herbs, as well as more than 300 species of birds, including highland and lowland species, as well as migratory species. The excellent visibility of the bridges allows enjoying the mass migration of raptors between November and February each year. It allows observation of herpetofauna like frogs, snakes and lizards, as well as mammals, martillas, raccoons, ocelots and margays.

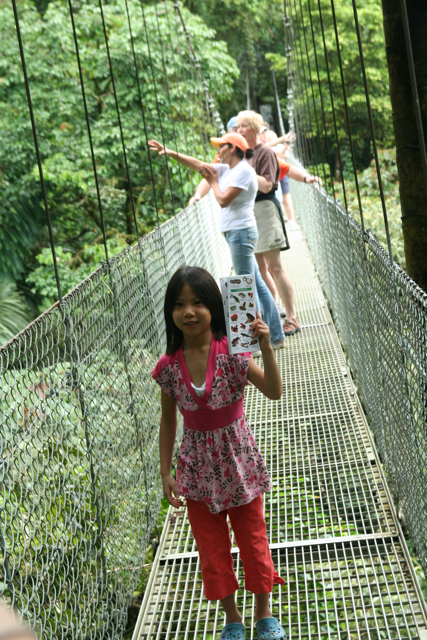
Actual Mistico Arenal Hanging Bridges view.
