= Carol Gardipe =

American geologist (born 1929)

- Born: 1929; Penobscot/Passamaquoddy
- Education: University of Connecticut, University of New Mexico
- Scientific career
- Fields: Geology
- Workplaces: United States Geological Survey National Oceanic and Atmospheric Administration

Carol Gardipe (also known as Carol Nelson, Carol Metcalf and Carol Metcalf-Gardipe; born 1929) is an American geologist, whose career has included positions with the United States Geological Survey (USGS), National Oceanic and Atmospheric Administration, and roles in higher education as a professor and administrator. She is one of the seven founders of the American Indian Science and Engineering Society (AISES).

== Early life and education ==
Gardipe was born in Penobscot/Passamaquoddy in 1929. She first attended the University of Connecticut, with a field semester at the University of Wyoming, Laramie. She earned her BA in Geology from the University of Connecticut. She taught for a time at Colby College. Gardipe attended graduate school at the University of New Mexico studying geography and natural resources.

== Career ==
After earning her BA, she worked in Newport News, Virginia, and then Washington DC, and on field mapping teams in the Southwest for the USGS. After completing her graduate work, Gardipe and Bob Whitman launched and directed the Native American Program at the College of Engineering (NAPCOE) for two years, the first program in the country for American Indian Engineers at University of New Mexico. During the same time she worked with the National Research Council Committee on Minorities in Engineering. In 1976, Gardipe with Al Qöyawayma, and Arnold Anderson formed the American Indian Engineering Council (AIEC). She worked as a marine geologist at National Oceanic and Atmospheric Administration.

In 1977, brought together by the National Academy of Engineering, Gardipe along with Arnold Anderson, Al Qëyawayma, George Thomas, Jerry Elliot, and Jim Shorty founded the National Society of American Indian Engineers now known as American Indian Science and Engineering Society (AISES). Gardipe served on the first Board of Directors for AISES. She was also active in the American Association for the Advancement of Science.

In 1981, she was guest speaker and was a member of the screening committee for the Science and Self-Determination program at University Colorado Boulder. The aim of the program was to acquaint American Indian high school students with first hand information about careers in science and to provide academic support that would improve performance on college entrance tests so these students would be able to access to careers in science and/or math at the university level.

== Personal life ==
In 1983, Gardipe was involved in a serious auto accident that has limited her activities. She resides in Albuquerque, New Mexico.

== Awards and recognition ==
Gardipe is a Fellow of the Geological Society of America. In 2003, she received the Ely S. Parker Award, the highest honor of the American Indian Science and Engineering Society.
