= Arenal Prehistory Project =

Studies of prehistory done during the 1980s

The Arenal Prehistory Project (Spanish: Proyecto Prehistorico Arenal) was a multidisciplinary research effort taking place between 1984 and 1987 that uncovered evidence of human occupation from Paleoindian and Archaic times through four sedentary phases to the Spanish Conquest in the tropical rainforest of Northwest Costa Rica.

== Introduction ==
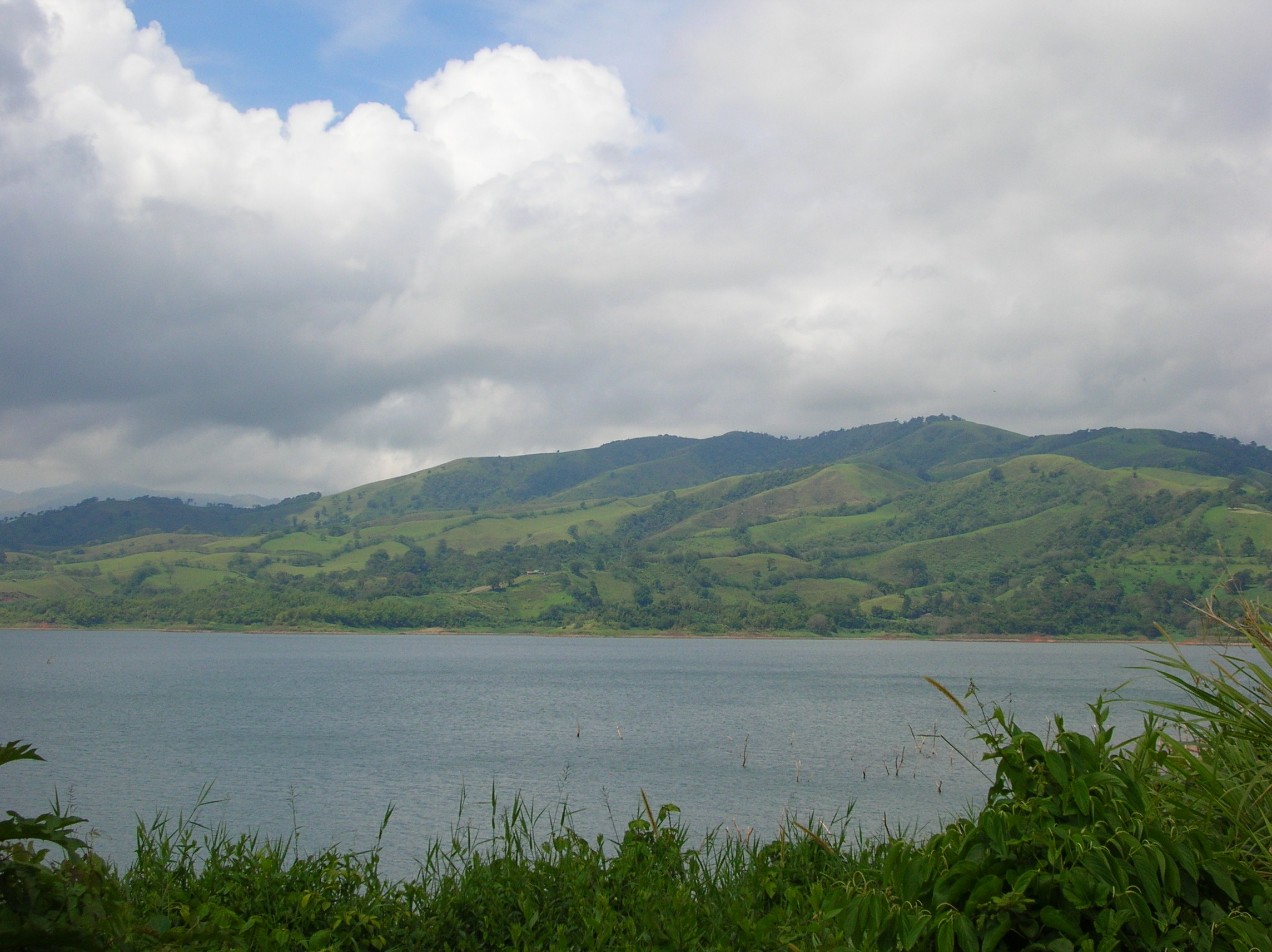
Lake Arenal, the Arenal Prehistory Project's research area

The Arenal Prehistory Project took place as the start of a larger, ongoing research effort in the area around Lake Arenal and Arenal Volcano in Guanacaste province, Costa Rica that has spanned from the early 1980s to the present day. This particular area of Middle America was found to be especially suitable for archaeological study because its dominant geographical feature, the still-active Arenal Volcano, had erupted at least nine times in prehistory and provided for extraordinary site-preservation with stratified layers of tephra that facilitated the dating of uncovered discoveries. Examination of the area affected by volcanic eruptions also allowed for further study of human adaptation to such events.

Primary disciplinary fields involved in the research project were archeology, botany, and volcanology. Funding was primarily granted by the National Science Foundation and the National Geographic Society. The Project's publishing researchers include Payson Sheets, Brian McKee, Marilynn Mueller, and Mark Chenault of the University of Colorado, John Hoopes of the University of Kansas, William Melson of the Smithsonian Institution, Tom Sever of Stennis Space Center, and John Bradley of San Juan College.

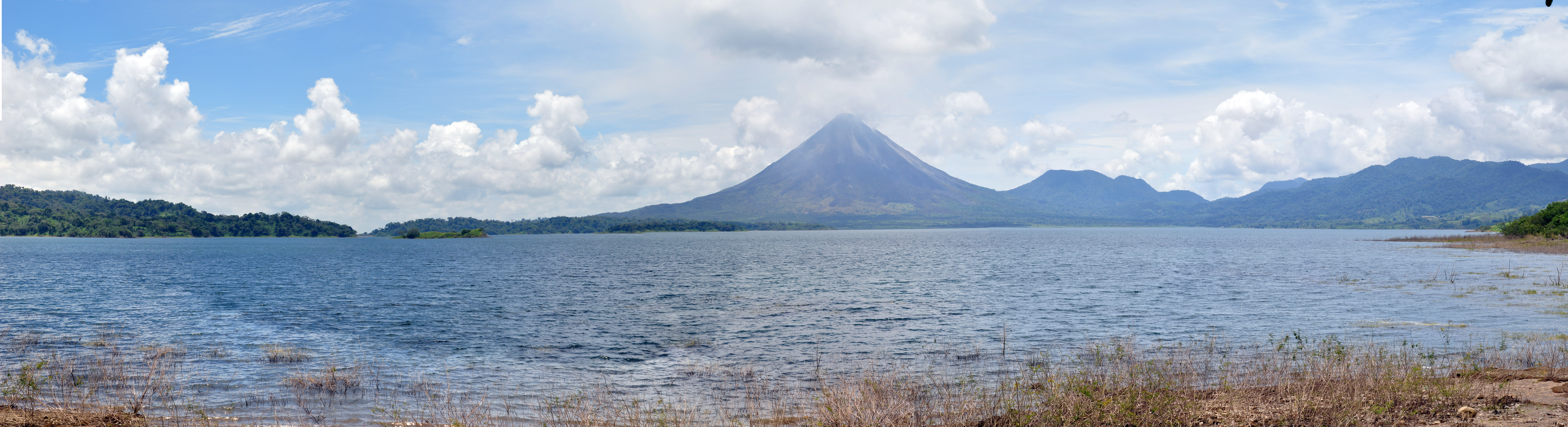
Arenal Volcano from across Lake Arenal

== Research methods ==
Excavation sites were chosen where a recently dammed and expanded Lake Arenal had exposed artifacts on the shoreline, the three major sites out of 39 total being Tronadora Vieja (Costa Rica's earliest dated formative village), Bolivar, and Silencio. The operation-lot system for field control was used in survey and excavation. Volcanological study was able to determine the sequence of prehistoric eruptions of Arenal Volcano and corresponding tephra deposits. When artifacts were found in association with these deposits, they could be independently dated using the predetermined sequence data as well as radiocarbon dating. Over 12,000 potsherds were found and analyzed, with pre-existing pottery sequences from Middle America and Mesoamerica used for comparison. Similarly, 8,755 chipped stone artifacts were found and analyzed, being classified in 18 different categories for comparison with those in existing databases. Only 224 ground stone artifacts were found and analyzed. Botanical remains (carbonized macrofossils, pollen, and phytoliths) were found and analyzed to profile the dietary habits of the region's previous inhabitants. Remote-sensing imagery was also used, and revealed prehistoric footpaths used for human transportation, which were excavated in 38 places by the researchers during the study.

== Findings ==
The Arenal Prehistory Project succeeded in uncovering and examining archaeological evidence for human occupation in the Northwest Costa Rica research area spanning 5,500 years, from 4000 BC to the time of the Spanish Conquest. It defined phases of occupation (see section below) that differ chronologically and in some technological and cultural aspects, but that are also, at their cores, remarkably similar given the numerous volcanic upheavals the area endured. Researchers found villages to have been occupied continuously from 2000 BC up until the centuries before the arrival of the Europeans, and stone tools to have been made the same way all throughout the recorded period of occupation. Compared to other Mesoamerican and Middle American populations, the Arenalan one was determined to have been incredibly self-sufficient (thanks in large part to the local availability of resources) and stable, having never experienced huge population increases or periods of dependence on a single agricultural staple.

== Arenal phases of occupation ==
Name	Dates	Characteristics
Fortuna (Archaic)	4000 - 3000 BC	Evidence typically includes surface finds, debitage, and campsites, indicating hunting and gathering.
?	3000 - 2000 BC	A gap in the archaeological record prevents definitive characterization of this period, which marks the transition between hunting and gathering and sedentary, agricultural, village-centric life.
Early Tronadora	2000 - 1000 BC	Includes the emergence of clearly identifiable sedentism, including the site of Tronadora Vieja, with elaborate ceramics, maize horticulture, and architecture securely dated within the period. Houses were circular, with thatched roofs and floors of flattened earth, and those dated by the Project (by association with tephra) pre-dated the previous oldest known in Costa Rica by over 1,000 years. Manos and metates were used for the processing of maize. Botanical evidence shows the existence of gardening, but the majority of consumption came from the collection of wild plants and animals. Burials were below-ground in rectangular pits located near houses, sometimes associated with ceramics. Villages generally included less than 100 residents. Societies were clearly egalitarian, with no discernible differentiation in house and burial quality
Late Tronadora	1000 - 500 BC	(See Above)
Early Arenal	500 BC - 1 AD	Shows an increase in numbers of houses, tools, and burials, and, therefore, population; also includes first indications of differences in social status, as some burials from this period appear to be more elaborate than others. Burials were organized in cemeteries a fair distance away from villages; a departure from earlier practices. The discovery of footpaths by remote sensing dates to this period.
Late Arenal	1 - 600 AD	(See Above)
Silencio	600 - 1300 AD	The number and sizes of recorded sites declines, as does, therefore, the period's population, yet cemeteries were moved even farther from villages and burials became more elaborate. Polychrome pottery made its first appearance, and a new type of chipped stone point, the "Silencio Point," came into use.
Tilaran	1300 - 1500 AD	Population dropped even more, and settlement patterns returned roughly to what they were in the Tronadora period, with smaller and more dispersed hamlets. Painting of ceramics ceased, with decoration techniques being converted to plastic surface modification.
