= Kenneth D. Ridgway =

American geologist

- Born: November 12, 1958 (age 67); Bridgeton, New Jersey, United States of America
- Education: University of Rochester

Kenneth D. Ridgway is a professor at Purdue University's Department of Earth, Atmospheric, and Planetary Sciences. He has been recognized by the Geological Society of America with the Randolph W. "Bill" and Cecile T. Bromery Award for Minorities. His research interests include sedimentary geology, basin analysis, tectonics, and petroleum geology. Ridgway identifies as a Lenape (Delaware) Indian and has been actively contributing to promoting minority student participation in the earth sciences through professional societies such as the Society for Advancement of Chicanos and Native Americans in Science (SACNAS), the American Indian Science and Engineering Society (AISES), and the American Geological Institute (AGI).

== Education ==
- 1992 University of Rochester, Ph.D., Geological Sciences
- 1986 Indiana University, M.S., Geology
- 1981 West Virginia University, B.S. Geology

== Awards and honors ==
- 2012 - Geological Society of America Bromery Award
- 2012 - Purdue University Dreamer Award
- 2011 - Fellow – Geological Society of America
- 2009 - College of Science, Graduate Student Mentoring Award
- 1998 - School of Science Faculty Award for Outstanding Assistant Professor in Teaching and Research

== Selected publications ==
- Finzel E.S., and K.D. Ridgway, (2017) Links between sedimentary basin development and Pacific Basin plate kinematics recorded in Jurassic to Miocene strata on the western Alaska Peninsula, Lithosphere, L592-1, doi: 10.1130/L592.1
- Dunn, C. A., Enkelmann, E., Ridgway, K.D., and Allen, W.K., (2017) Source to sink evaluation of sediment routing in the Gulf of Alaska and Southeast Alaska: a thermochronometric perspective, Journal of Geophysical Research: Earth Surface, 122, doi:10.1002/2016JF004168
