= Connie Varnhagen =

American professor of psychology and academic director

Connie Kendall Varnhagen
- Born: 16 December
- Education: Kenyon College (BA), University of Notre Dame (MA), UC Santa Barbara (PhD), San Juan College (AAS)
- Occupation: Professor of Psychology
- Employer: University of Alberta
- Website: http://www.psych.ualberta.ca/~varn/research.htm

Connie Kendall Varnhagen (born 16 December) is an American professor of psychology and academic director of the undergraduate research initiative at the University of Alberta in Edmonton, Alberta. Her research has centred on around how children, adolescents and adults develop and use cognitive strategies.

In 2009 she became a qualified veterinary technician after graduating from a veterinary technology distance learning program with San Juan College. Since June 2012, she also works as a technician and researcher with the Edmonton Humane Society's "Prevent Another Litter" program, which is trying to combat pet overpopulation in Alberta by neutering and spaying household pets to stop them from breeding.

== Early life and education ==
Varnhagen grew up in Evanston, Illinois, where she attended the Evanston Township High School. She studied psychology at Kenyon College in Gambier, Ohio, where she graduated with a Bachelor of Arts in Psychology in 1977. That year she was also awarded both the Psychology and Humanitarian awards from Kenyon College. It was there that she met her husband to be, Stanley Varnhagen, whom she married in December 1978. Her husband also works at the University of Alberta as an academic director.

Varnhagen earned a master's degree in psychology at the University of Notre Dame in Indiana in 1980. and a PhD in psychology at UC Santa Barbara in 1985. Her thesis for her PhD was on text relations and prose comprehension.

== Career ==
Varnhagen was an associate professor of psychology at the University of Alberta for 11 years from 1993 until she became a professor of psychology in 2004.

Varnhagen has conducted research in the area of spelling development, developing the theories of cognitive development and design instruction, materials, and technology that maximise the acquisition of this literacy skill. In particular she compares the contributions of text spelling and text speak to successful reading and spelling development. She conducted and published research on the usefulness of spell checkers, ‘Spelling and Grammar Checkers: Are They Useful?’.

Varnhagen also researches the interaction of children with the internet. She co-authored the book Psychology and the internet: Intrapersonal, Interpersonal, and Transpersonal Implications, which discusses social development, unwanted exposure to harmful content, bullying and predation. Varnhagen also researched elements of web design and web dynamics, and the effectiveness of children's online research and online teaching.

Varnhagen researches, teaches and writes about the human animal bond, its history and effect on society through the ages. She is affiliated with the Centre for the Human Animal Bond at Purdue University of Veterinary Medicine. In 2016, she is working with the organization to help low income people keep their pets.

Varnhagen was named a 3M National Teaching Fellow, an honour given to selected university professors in Canada.

== Publications ==
Varnhagen has published one book, Making sense of psychology on the web in 2002. She has also co-authored books with other researchers including Peter O. Gray, Thomas Ludwig, David G. Myers, Kathleen Stassen Berger on various child development and psychology topics.

- Varnhagen, Connie K. (2002). Making sense of psychology on the web. New York: W.H. Freeman. ISBN 978-0716752240.
- Varnhagen, Connie K.; Drake, Sean M.; Finley, Gary (December 1997). "Teaching statistics with the Internet". Teaching of Psychology. 24 (4): 275–278. doi:10.1207/s15328023top2404_14.
- Varnhagen, Connie K. (2007). "Chapter 2 – Children and the Internet". In Gackenbach, Jayne (ed.). Psychology and the internet intrapersonal, interpersonal, and transpersonal implications (2 ed.). Amsterdam: Elsevier/Academic Press. pp. 37–54. ISBN 978-0-12-369425-6.
