= Una Hanbury =

American sculptor (1904–1990)

- Born: Una Rawnsley; October 8, 1904; Staines, Middlesex, England
- Died: February 9, 1990 (aged 85); Santa Fe, New Mexico
- Education: Sir Jacob Epstein and Frank Calderon; Royal Academy of Arts; Academie Julian; Academie de la Grande Chaumiere; L'Atelier de Vieux Vaison
- Known for: Sculpture
- Notable work: Busts of Georgia O'Keeffe, Rachel Carson, Robert Oppenheimer
- Relatives: Hardwicke Rawnsley (grandfather)

Una Hanbury (née Rawnsley), (October 8, 1904 – February 9, 1990) was an English-born American sculptor, best known for her bronze portraits of Georgia O'Keeffe, Rachel Carson, J. Robert Oppenheimer, and other noted figures of the twentieth century.

== Early life and education ==
Hanbury was born Una Rawnsley on October 8, 1904, in the English town of Staines, the daughter of Noel Harwicke Rawnsley and Violet Hilton Cutbill Rawnsley. She grew up primarily in Kent. Her grandfather was Hardwicke Rawnsley. After graduation from London's Polytechnic School of Art, she studied for three years at the Royal Academy of Arts. Jacob Epstein was her most influential teacher.

== Career ==
She left England during World War II with her young daughters, and in 1944 she worked at the British Embassy in Washington, D.C.

After taking time off for her family, Hanbury resumed her art career in the mid-1960s. She had one-person exhibitions at the Folger Shakespeare Library and the National Portrait Gallery in Washington, DC, in 1971. Hanley made sculptural portraits of Georgia O'Keeffe, Rachel Carson, J. Robert Oppenheimer, Hans Bethe, Enrico Fermi, Edward Teller, Buckminster Fuller, Richard Neutra, Isadora Duncan, Polingaysi, Frances Oldham Kelsey, and Andrés Segovia.

== Personal life and legacy ==
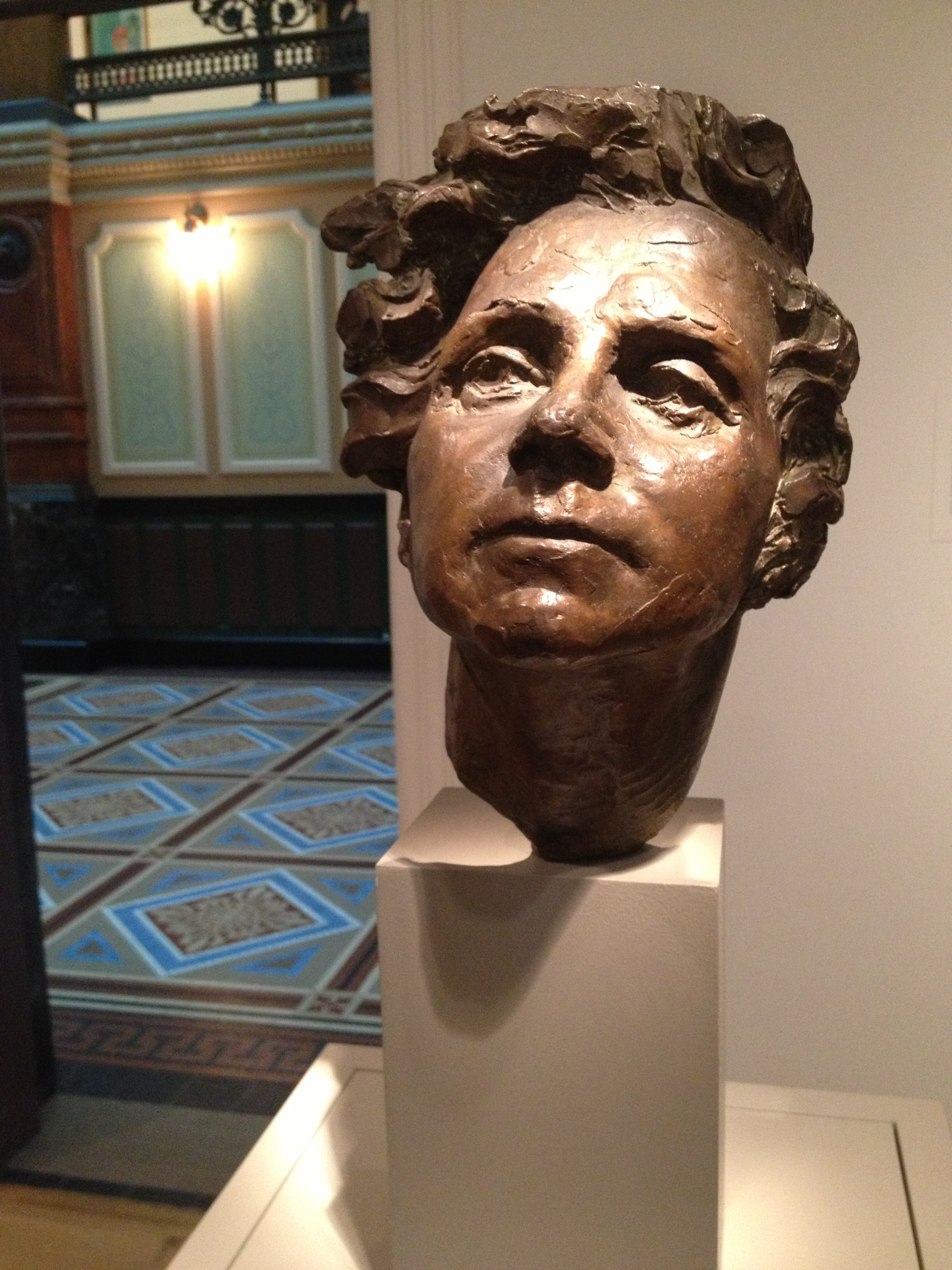
Rachel Carson bust by Una Hanbury

In 1926, she married stockbroker Anthony H. R. C. Hanbury in London. They had two daughters, and divorced. In 1957, she married Canadian pilot Alan Coatsworth Brown. In 1970, she moved to Santa Fe, New Mexico, where she stayed until her death in 1990, at the age of 85.

Her papers are in the Smithsonian Archives of American Art. Her daughter Diana Hanbury King (1927–2018) was an expert in the treatment of dyslexia. Her grandson, Colin Poole, is also an artist; in 2023, he recreated an outdoor sculpture by Hanbury, Compassion, for the city of Arlington, Virginia, using her tools and reference photos.

== Public collections ==
- Smithsonian Institution
- Wheelwright Museum
- National Portrait Gallery (United States)
- Royal Academy, London
- Kennedy Center
- Wheelwright Museum
- Museum of Northern Arizona
- Mesa Public Library (Los Alamos)
- ABQ BioPark Zoo (Albuquerque)
- New Mexico Museum of Art
- Albuquerque Museum of Art and History
- Georgia O'Keeffe Museum
- Neuac Sculpture Park (Arandjelovac, Serbia)
