= La Fortuna, San Carlos =

District in San Carlos canton, Alajuela province, Costa Rica

La Fortuna
- District
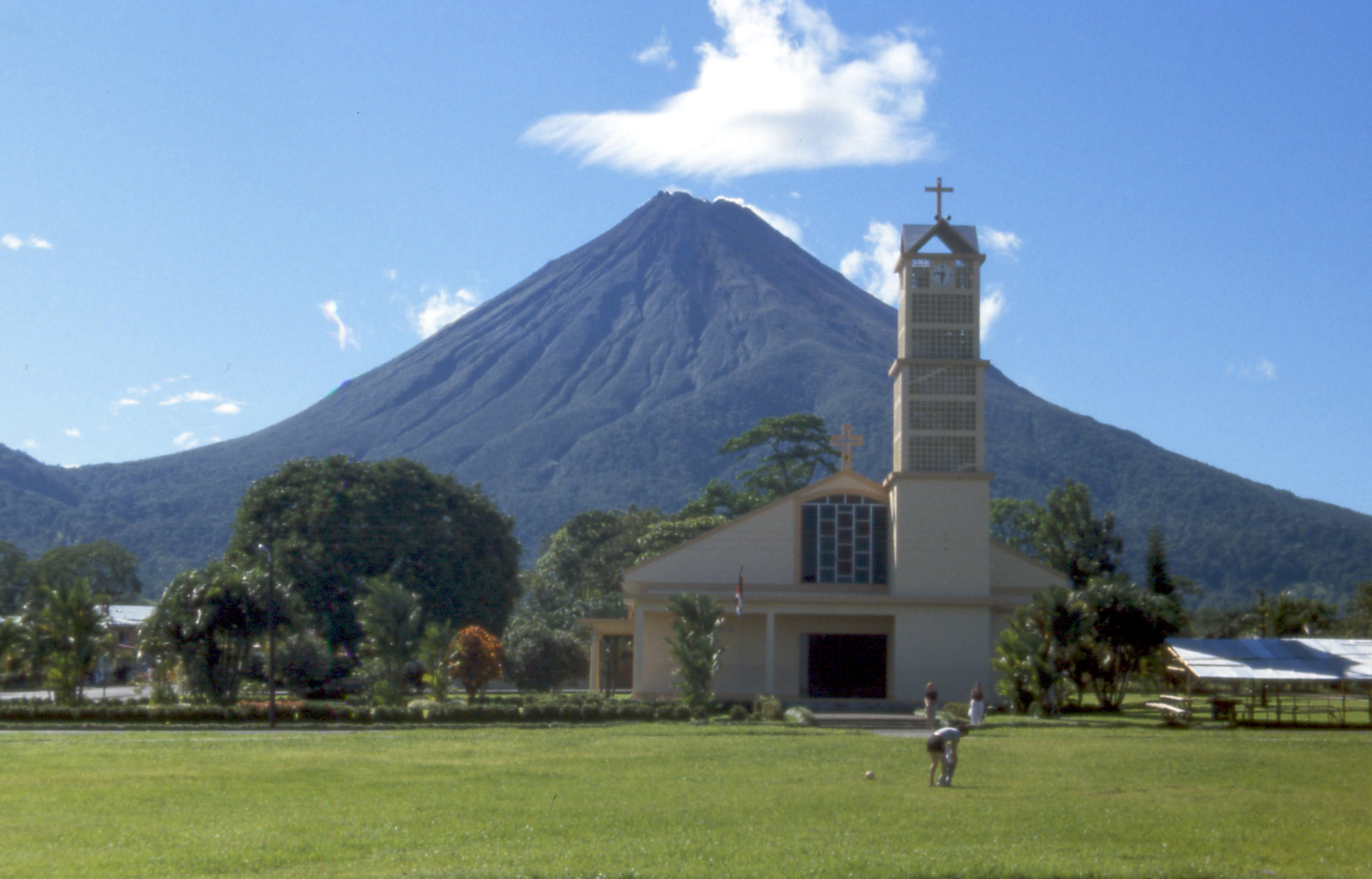
- Arenal Volcano as seen from downtown La Fortuna.
- Interactive map of La Fortuna
- La Fortuna district location in Costa Rica
- Coordinates: 10.4482962°N 84.6421456°W
- Country: Costa Rica
- Province: Alajuela
- Canton: San Carlos
- Creation: 5 February 1952

Area
  - Total: 229.7 km^{2} (88.7 sq mi)
- Elevation: 253 m (830 ft)

Population (2011)
  - Total: 15,383
  - Density: 66.97/km^{2} (173.5/sq mi)
- Time zone: UTC−06:00
- Postal code: 21007

La Fortuna is a district of the San Carlos canton, in the Alajuela province of Costa Rica.

== Toponymy ==
"La Fortuna" is Spanish for "The Fortune", and aptly named due its ample supply of tourist attractions and extremely fertile lands. Although there is a common myth that the town got its name due to its sparing from the Arenal Volcano's eruptions, the town actually got its name before the latest eruption cycle and was named for the fertile lands ("The Fortune") where it is located.

== History ==
La Fortuna was created on 5 February 1952 by Decreto Ejecutivo 15.

Originally called "El Burío", La Fortuna was founded in the mid 1930s by settlers that came from Quesada of San Carlos, Grecia (canton), Alajuela, and other parts of the region. In 1968, the Arenal Volcano erupted to the west, causing extensive damage and casualties, including 82 deaths. The eruption did not reach the village of La Fortuna. This catastrophe, nonetheless, changed the geography of the whole region, making it one of the most visited tourist destinations of Costa Rica.

The town and surrounding province was founded by a small group of people, namely Elias Kooper, Alberto Quesada, Jose Garro, Rufino and Isolina Quesada, Juana Vargas Ricardo Quiros, Juan Ledesma, Red Porfirio, and Julio Murillo. This group and a few others were dedicated to the cultivating of the land and are largely responsible for its development.

== Geography ==
La Fortuna has an area of 229.7 km^{2} and an elevation of 253 metres.

=== Arenal volcano ===
Arenal is often cited by scientists as being in the top 10 or 20 of the world's most active volcanoes. La Fortuna is less than 10 kilometres (6 mi) from the 5,480 feet (1,670 m) peak of Arenal and less than 20 kilometres (12 mi) from the Arenal Volcano National Park entrance, which is west of the peak, whereas La Fortuna is east of the peak.

=== Chato Volcano ===
The Cerro Chato, also known as the Chato Volcano, is a dormant volcano that first erupted 38,000 years ago and last erupted 3,500 years ago. One of its eruptions paved the way for the nearby La Fortuna Waterfall. Cerro Chato has two peaks, Chatito (little Chato) and Espina (Thorn), as well as a 1,640-foot (500 m) crater filled with green water. At an elevation of 3,740 feet (1,140 m), Cerro Chato stands much shorter than its neighbor Volcano Arenal, but this also makes it hike-able. However, the trail has been closed for environmental protection, and entering it is considered trespassing. Classified as a difficult hike and at times a "climb", it is recommended only for hikers of good physical condition. The average hike lasts 5 hours, and can be very muddy when it rains. Due to certain minerals in the water, some advise no swimming, however most locals disagree and swim in it regardless.

== Demographics ==
Historical population
Census	Pop.	±% p.a.
1963	2,931	—
1973	3,710	+2.38%
1984	4,476	+1.72%
2000	9,743	+4.98%
2011	15,383	+4.24%
2022	16,150	+0.44%
Source: Instituto Nacional de Estadística y Censos; Centro Centroamericano de Población

For the 2011 census, La Fortuna had a population of 15,383 inhabitants.

There are 9 small communities with a total of 15,383 inhabitants, making it the fourth most populated district of the canton, just behind the districts of Quesada, Aguas Zarcas (es), and Pital.

== Transportation ==
=== Road transportation ===
The district is covered by the following road routes:

- National Route 4
- National Route 141
- National Route 142
- National Route 702
- National Route 936

== Tourism ==
In addition to the volcanoes, La Fortuna has tourist attractions such as the 70 metres (230 ft) La Catarata de la Fortuna waterfall, several resorts with natural hot springs temperate enough to bathe in, other day spa services, and day-trips that involve horseback riding, whitewater rafting, hanging bridges, a "sky tram", zip-lines, mountain biking, kayaking, stand-up paddleboards, ATV or dirt bike rentals, "butterfly farms", the Venado Cavern tours, bungee jumping, Laguna Cedeno, El Salto Swimming Hole, and canyoneering.

=== Transportation ===
There are a few taxis in the town that can be called if needed, but most tourism companies provide their own means of transportation. Additionally, there are car rental locations and even ATV's and dirt bikes if one wishes to go off-roading.

La Fortuna is served by Arenal Airport, 7 kilometres (4.3 mi) east of town.

=== Hot Springs ===
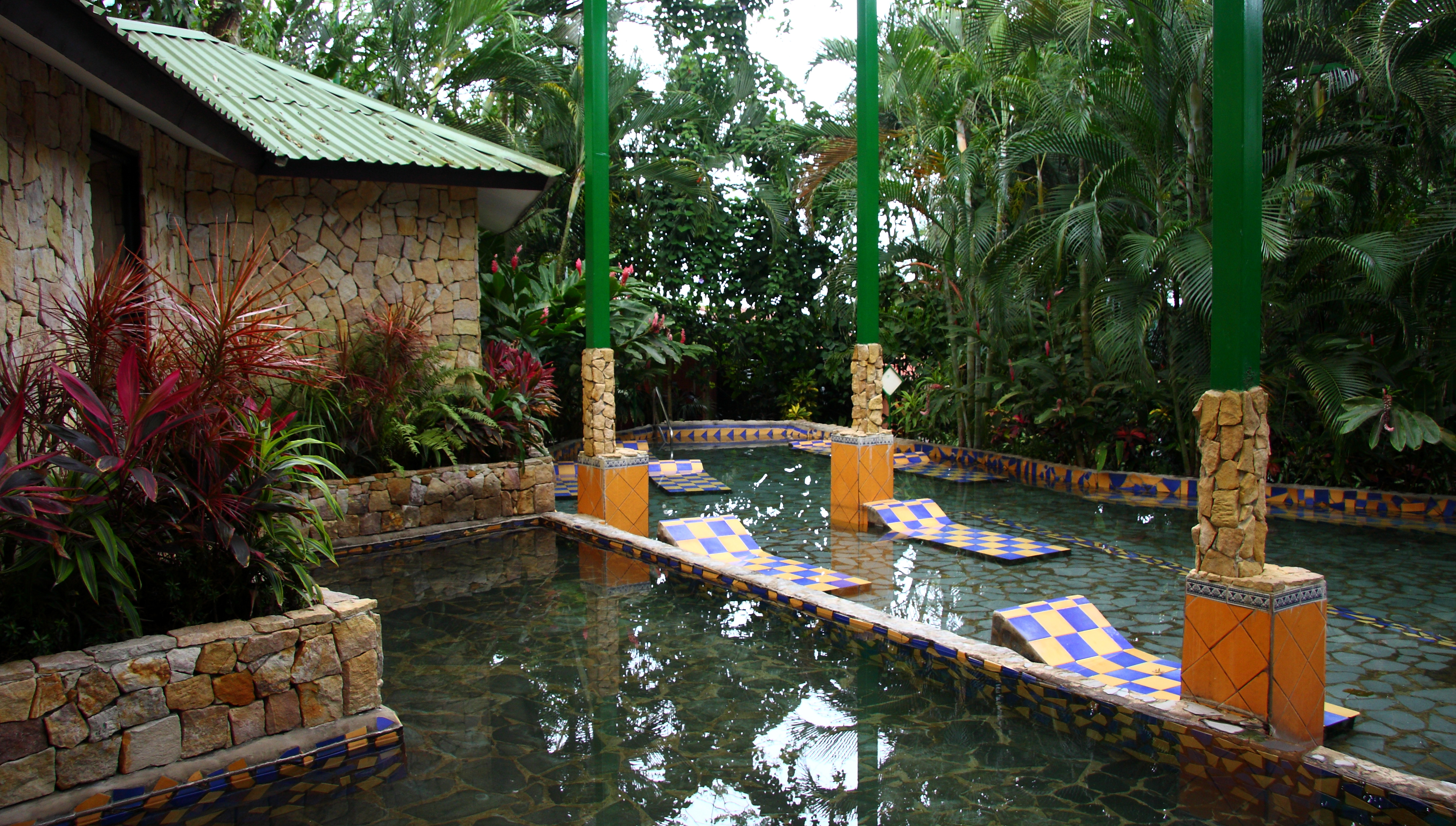
Baldi Hot Springs resort, Fortuna, Costa Rica.

Throughout La Fortuna there are several natural hot springs with temperatures ranging from 30 to 50 °C, which emanate from the depths of the volcano through rivers located in the Earth's crust. Arenal Volcano naturally heats the water of many, such as Tabacon River, Ecotermales Hot Springs, and hot springs located on hotel property such as Titokú of Kioro, Arenal Paraiso, Royal Corin, Los Lagos pools, and Baldi Hot Springs. There are also other hot water sources that are either not currently being exploited for tourism, or are being so in an incipient manner.

== Climate ==
Due to being in the tropics, the climate of La Fortuna and Costa Rica in general does not vary greatly like those areas in the temperate zones. The four seasons are not all experienced in La Fortuna, which means one can expect close to 12 hours of daylight at any time of the year. The biggest changes in temperature are the effect of the wet and dry seasons. With the dry season being more subject to direct and intense sunlight, there is a resulting higher average temperature of above 25 C (77 F). The wet season, however, usually includes higher levels of humidity which may be perceived as very warm. The annual average temperature in La Fortuna is between 20 C and 26 C (68 F to 78 F).

== Medical care and local business ==
La Fortuna has a medical clinic, but serious injuries may require a medical evacuation. La Fortuna also has a veterinary clinic, dentist office, police station, gas station, 3 banks, 3 groceries, restaurants (in addition to those in the resorts), a post office, thrift shops, clothing stores, and a hardware store.
