= Floy Agnes Lee =

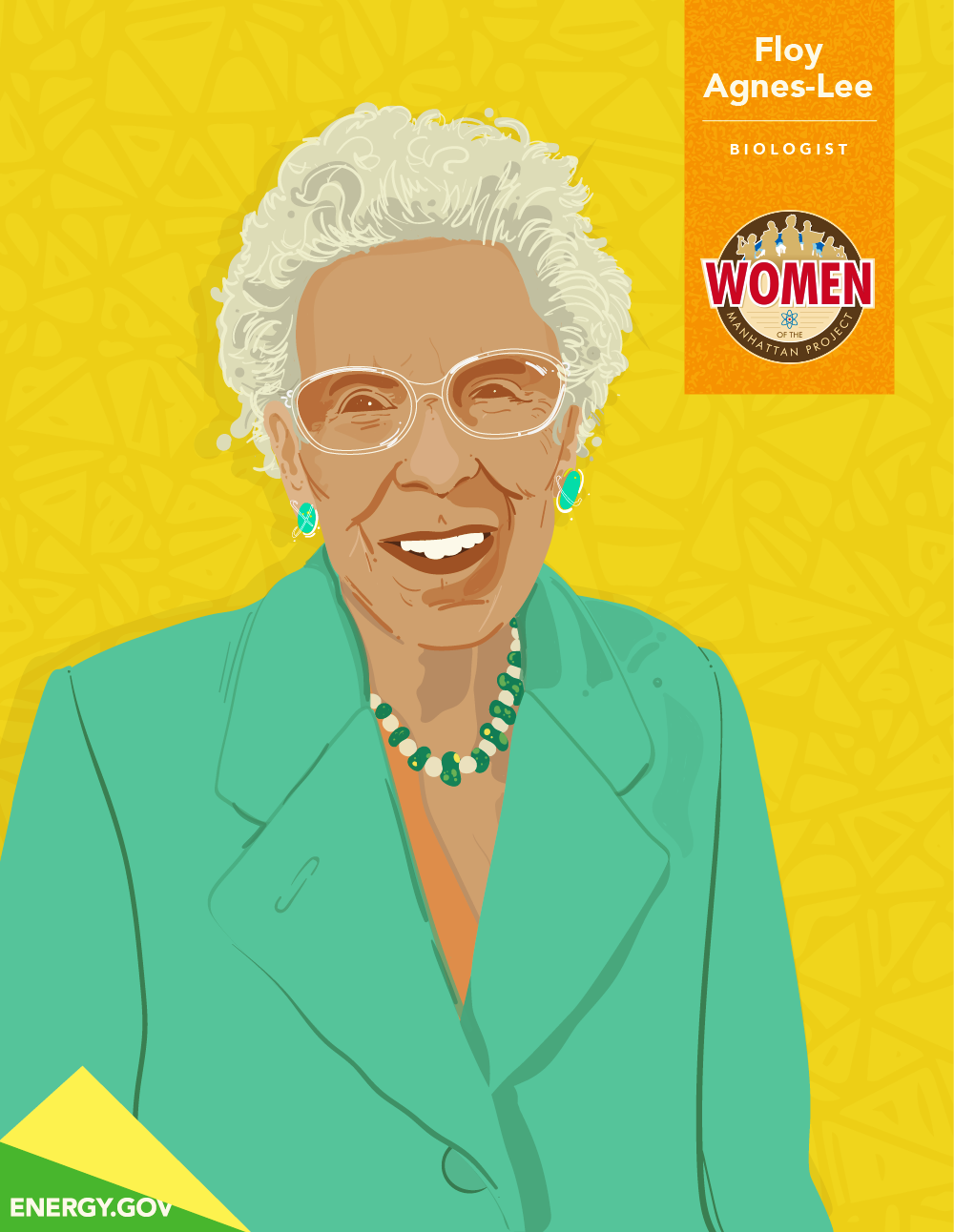
- An illustration of Floy Agnes Lee
- Born: July 23, 1922; Albuquerque, New Mexico
- Died: March 6, 2018 (aged 95); Santa Fe, New Mexico
- Education: University of New Mexico (B.S.); University of Chicago (Ph.D.)
- Known for: Work on the Manhattan Project
- Scientific career
- Thesis: Effects of X-irradiation on DNA synthesis in regenerating liver (1966)

Floy Agnes "Aggie" (Naranjo Stroud) Lee (23 July 1922 - 6 March 2018) was an American biologist who worked on the Manhattan Project at Los Alamos as a hematology technician.

== Early life and education ==
Floy Agnes Lee (née Naranjo) was born July 23, 1922, at the Albuquerque Indian School and was the fourth of five siblings. Her mother was a German-American teacher from Indiana who had traveled in the United States teaching at different Indian schools, including the Winnebago Indian schools in Wisconsin, in Santa Fe, and at the Albuquerque Indian School. Her Native American father was a member of Santa Clara Pueblo meaning that she had Tewa ancestry.

Lee grew up at the Albuquerque Indian School, but was sent to St. Mary's Catholic School for her education. She then went on to graduate from Albuquerque High School. In 1945, she graduated from the University of New Mexico (UNM) with a degree in biology. While there, she worked for a professor putting different solutions into each plant to see how they grew. This job made her more interested in doing research. During her college years, she also learned to fly planes and worked at a grocery store to pay for flying lessons. She was one flight short of qualifying to become a member of the Women’s Airforce Service Pilots before the program was disbanded in 1944.

In 1945, Professor Edward Castetter, head of UNM's biology department, asked Lee to do research for him. While she was compiling and recording information on what the Indigenous people of New Mexico ate before colonization, Castetter asked her to postpone a trip she had planned to see her mother's relatives to finish the research. While Lee continued this research, Castetter received a call from Los Alamos. They told him that they were looking for a biology student or a graduate to work in the hematology laboratory.

== Family life ==
Lee grew up in Arizona and later moved to Chicago to continue her education. Lee had one daughter and was married three times, all which preceded her in death.

== Manhattan Project ==
Lee accepted this position at the hematology lab at Los Alamos in 1945. She collected and examined blood samples from Manhattan Project scientists, including Louis Hempelmann, as well as Louis Slotin and Alvin Graves after the criticality accident that exposed Slotin to a fatal dose of radiation. Lee said that she learned how to take blood, read blood cell counts, and identify blood types on the job, but that she excelled at these tasks once taught. She was sent to different sites of the Manhattan Project where she would draw blood from individuals. While working in the hematology lab at Los Alamos, Lee was assigned specific scientists to monitor, including Enrico Fermi.

Lee and Fermi became friends during this time. In Lee's oral history, conducted by the Atomic Heritage Foundation, she elaborated on her relationship with Fermi: "We got to talking about what I liked to do and what he liked to, and we got on the subject of tennis. Now, I did not know that this was Enrico Fermi. I only knew him as a number, because they wouldn’t give names out. So we would play tennis. This was before the bomb was dropped, and then afterwards also. He was a short man, and he had a funny little hat." After the atomic bombs were detonated over Hiroshima and Nagasaki, Lee was told that she had been playing tennis with a Nobel Prize-winner for months. She was shocked. She said that her response was: "'Oh, I can't believe that.' Because I was beating him in tennis every time. So when we went out to play tennis later, I didn't beat him. I tried not to. We became very, very good friends."

== Post-war career ==
After the war ended, Fermi encouraged Lee to continue her studies at the University of Chicago. She moved to Chicago, began her doctorate in biology, and worked at Argonne National Laboratory. She continued to study, work at the lab and raise her child after her husband died from cancer. After 14 years, she received her PhD. She later worked at the Jet Propulsion Lab in California and returned to work at Los Alamos National Laboratory before she retired. Over the course of her long career, she conducted research on the impact of radiation on chromosomes.

== Professional affiliations ==
Lee joined the American Association for Cancer Research in 1954 and continued until 1979 when her membership transferred to Emeritus. She was also a member of two cancer working groups, the Women in Cancer Research and the Cancer Research and Tumor Microenvironment Working Group.

She was a founding member of the American Indian Science and Engineering Society in 1977.

Lee died in 2018 at the age of 95.
