= Arenal Volcano National Park =

National park of Costa Rica

- IUCN category II (national park)
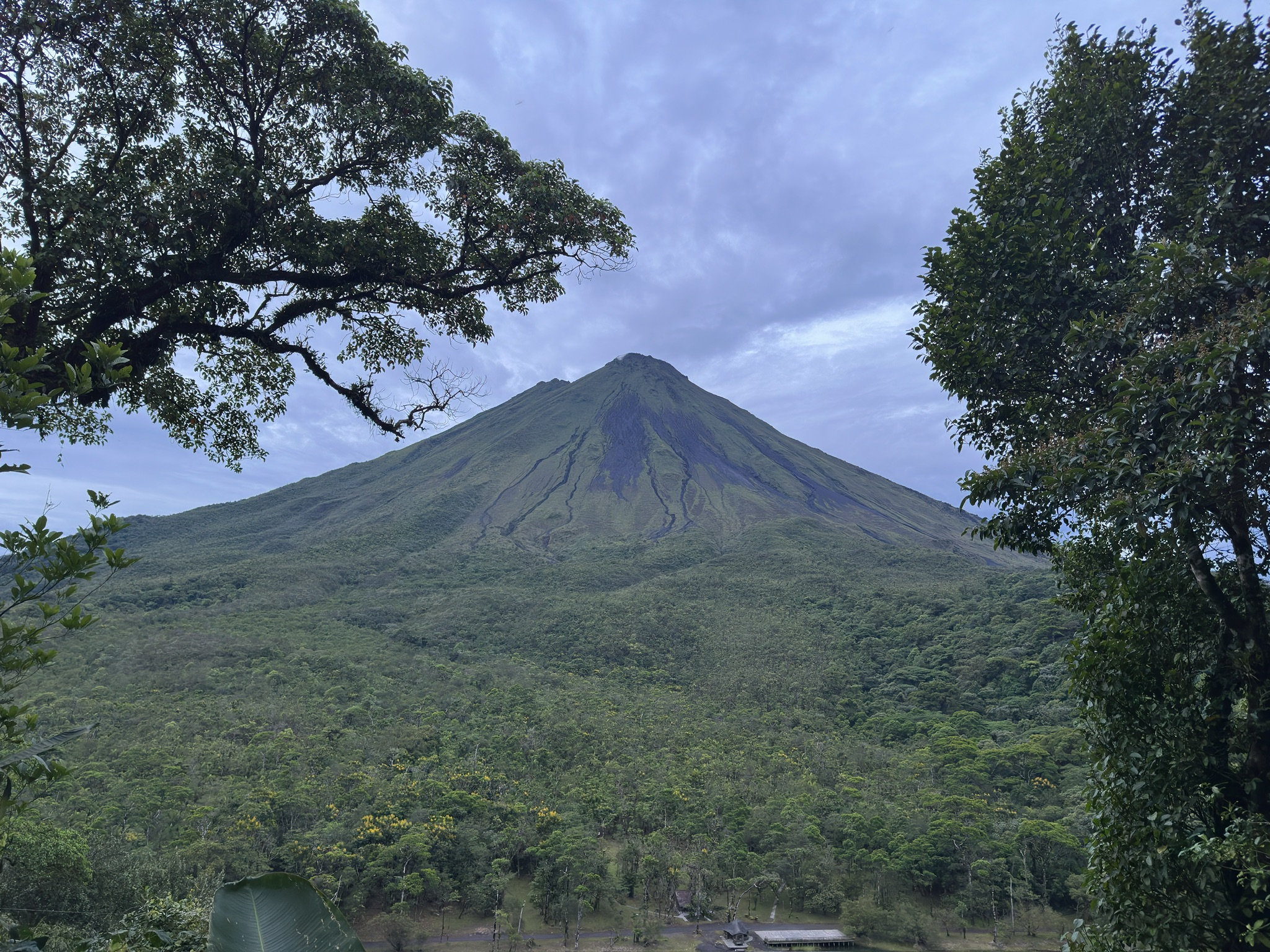
- Location: Costa Rica
- Coordinates: 10°27′41″N 84°44′22″W
- Area: 121.24 km^{2} (46.81 mi^{2})
- Established: 1991
- Governing body: National System of Conservation Areas (SINAC) National Parks of Costa Rica
- Location in Costa Rica

Arenal Volcano National Park (Spanish: Parque Nacional Volcán Arenal) is a Costa Rican national park in the central part of the country, part of the Arenal Huetar Norte Conservation Area. The park protects eight of Costa Rica's 12 life zones and 16 protected reserves in the region between the Guanacaste and Tilarán mountain ranges, and including Lake Arenal.

The park encompasses the Arenal Volcano, the most active in the country, which was believed to be dormant until a major eruption in 1968. The 1968 explosive eruption killed 78 people and devastated several villages on the volcano's western flank. The continuous eruptive activity that began in 1968 ended in December 2010, when the volcano returned to a state of dormancy. It neighbors Lake Arenal, which is the site of the country's largest hydroelectricity project, the Lake Arenal Dam. The park also contains a second volcano, Chato, whose crater contains a lagoon. It is also called Cerro Chato (literally Mount Chato) as it has been inactive for around 3,500 years – coinciding with the creation and growth of Arenal itself.

In and around the park are various lodges and hotels, some with their own hot springs, and others focused on the wildlife of the area. The park is most directly accessed from La Fortuna, but is also easily accessed via Tilarán and the north shore of Lake Arenal. Within the national park are the Museum of Volcanicity and a ranger station.

== Flora and fauna ==
The Arenal Volcano National Park is popular with birders, as most of the 850 species identified in Costa Rica can be found within the park's borders. This includes one of the country's most elusive and beautiful birds, the endangered resplendent quetzal. Animal species living within the park include white-faced capuchin monkeys, jaguar, deer, coati, and snakes like the fer-de-lance and parrot snake.

The park also has a strong showing of plant life, including orchids, heliconias, ferns, laurel, cirri, guayabo de monte, palms, bromeliads, and strangler figs.

== See also ==
- Tourism in Costa Rica
- List of volcanoes in Costa Rica
- National Parks of Costa Rica
- La Fortuna, Costa Rica
- Arenal Hanging Bridges
