= Chato Volcano =

Volcano in Costa Rica

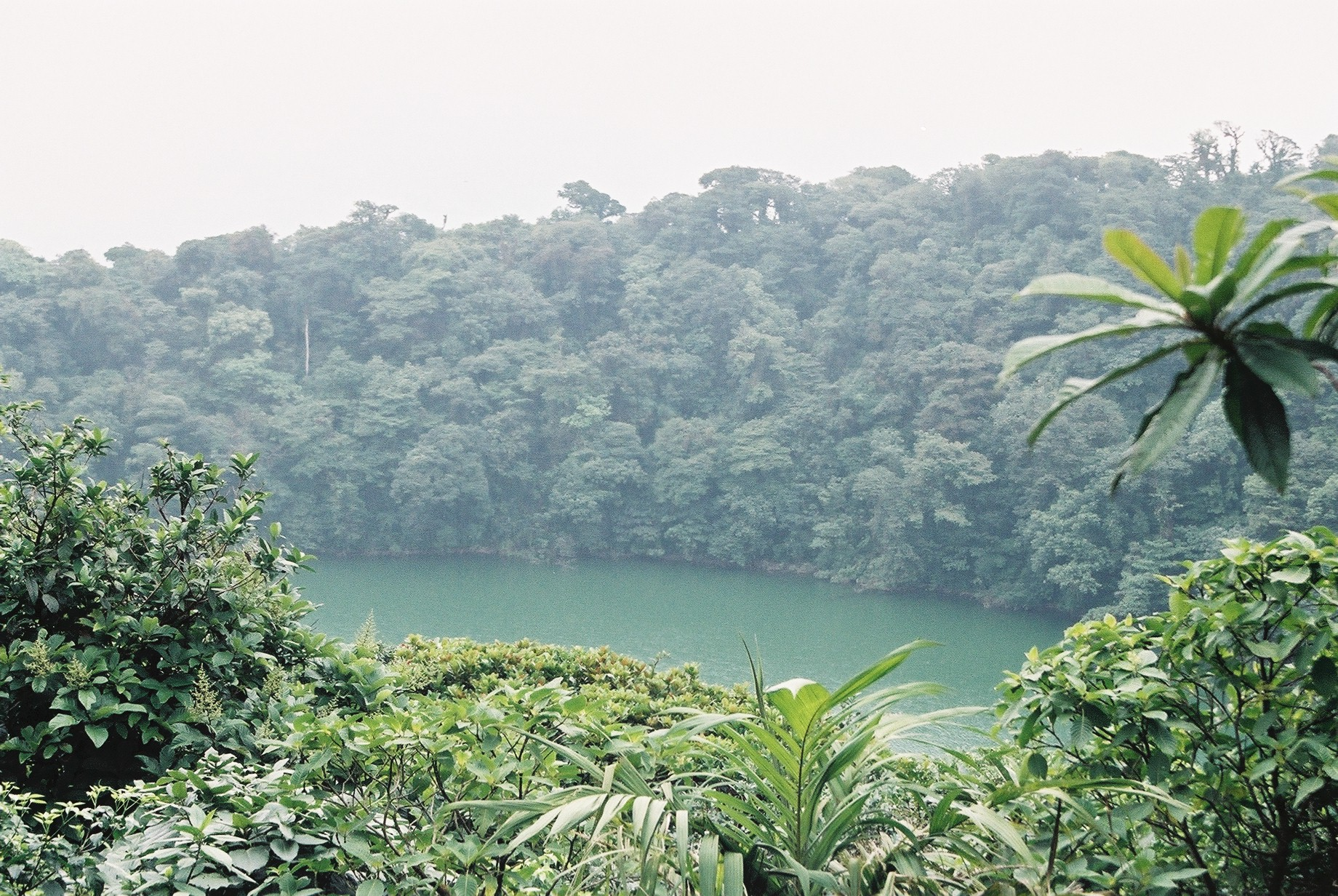
- Crater Lake of Cerro Chato

Highest point
- Elevation: 1,140 m (3,740 ft)
- Coordinates: 10°26′31″N 84°41′17″W

Geography
- Location within Costa Rica
- Location: Costa Rica
- Parent range: Guanacaste Cordillera

Geology
- Mountain type: Stratovolcano
- Volcanic arc: Central America Volcanic Arc
- Last eruption: ~3500 years ago

Chato Volcano, sometimes called "Cerro Chato" (Spanish for "Flat Hill"), is an inactive volcano in northwestern Costa Rica northwest of San José, in the province of Alajuela, canton of San Carlos, and district of La Fortuna. It is southeast of the nearby Arenal Volcano.

Cerro Chato is believed to have first erupted 38,000 years ago during the Pleistocene period and last erupted about 3,500 years ago. One of the lava flows is now the route for La Fortuna Waterfall. The hill has two peaks, named Chatito ("little Chato") and Espina ("thorn"). A crater about 500 metres (1,600 ft) wide is filled with green water, making the Laguna Cerro Chato.

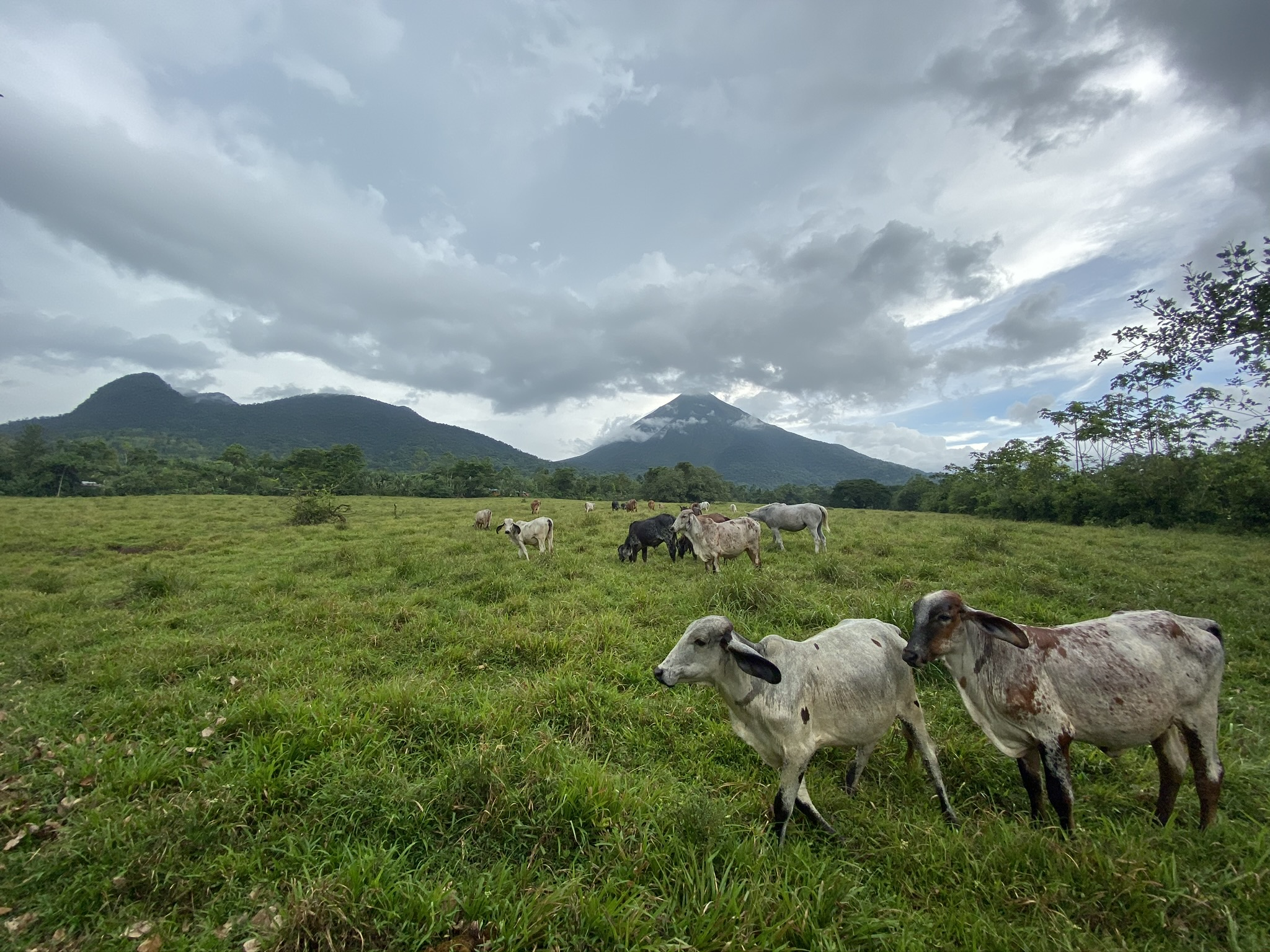
Cerro Chato Volcano, on the left, as seen from La Fortuna. Arenal Volcano is seen on the right.

== Hiking ==
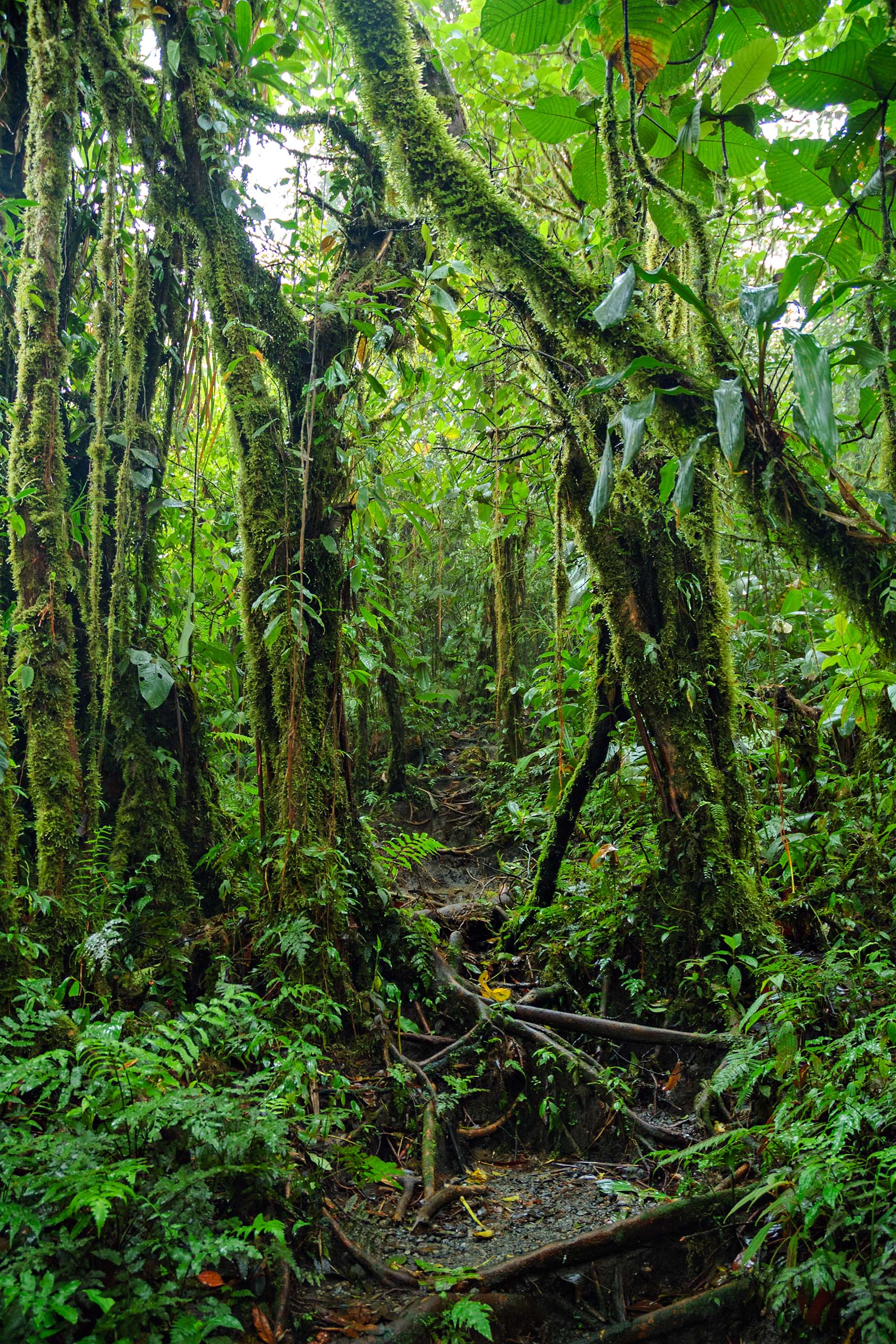
Cerro Chato volcano, path through the lush cloud forest, Fortuna, Costa Rica

The Costa Rican government has closed the trail to Cerro Chato, making it illegal to climb. This law was passed in 1998 but was not enforced until 2017, encouraging hikers, tour operators and business owners to sell this attraction and tour. When it was open it was considered a difficult hike and only recommended for hikers in good physical condition. When it rains, the path becomes muddy and even more treacherous, especially when descending into the crater itself. The environmental damage the illegal hiking has caused is the main cause of the closure.
