= Arnold Anderson (scientist) =

American chemical engineer (1915–1983)

Arnold "Andy" Tennyson "A.T." Anderson (1915–1983) was a Six Nations tribal member. He was a chemical engineer at Union Carbide during World War II, where he worked on the Manhattan Project to help the United States develop the first atomic bombs. He held a degree in chemistry from McMaster University in Ontario, Canada.

Anderson received presidential commendations from Gerald Ford and Jimmy Carter for his work on the American Indian Policy Review Commission. He strived to attract Indigenous people to science, technology, engineering, and mathematics fields. He is credited as the "Father of the American Indian Science and Engineering Society" (AISES) for his visionary leadership, being a founding member and becoming the first chief executive officer.

The A.T. Anderson Memorial Scholarship honors his AISES legacy.
