= Advancing Indigenous Science and Engineering Society =

Non-profit organisation in the USA

- Formation: 1977
- Founder: Arnold Anderson; Al Qöyawayma; Carol Gardipe; George Thomas; Jerry Elliott; Jim Shorty
- Type: 501(c)(3)
- Purpose: Native American education
- Location(s): 2305 Renard SE, Suite 200; Albuquerque, New Mexico, US
- Region served: United States and Canada
- Members: c. 4000
- Key people: Sarah EchoHawk (Pawnee); Chief Executive Officer
- Endowment: $1,000,000 - $4,999,999
- Employees: 10 to 29 FTE
- Website: www.aises.org

The Advancing Indigenous Science and Engineering Society (AISES) is a 501(c)(3) non-profit professional association with the goal of substantially increasing American Indian, Alaskan Native, Native Hawaiian, Pacific Islander, First Nation and other indigenous peoples of North America representation in the fields of science, technology, engineering, math (STEM) and other related disciplines. Its headquarters is located in Albuquerque, New Mexico. As of May 1, 2013, Sarah EchoHawk is the chief executive officer.

== History ==
AISES was founded in 1977, by American Indian scientists: Manhattan Project scientist and Mohawk, Arnold Anderson, Al Qöyawayma, Carol Gardipe (Penobscot), George Thomas (Cherokee), Jerry Elliott (Cherokee/Osage), Alex Labadie (Osage) and Jim Shorty (Navajo) and Floy Agnes Lee.

Since its founding, the society has held the annual, three-day AISES National Conference, which includes the largest job fair in Indian country. In October 2025, the society changed its name from "American Indian Science and Engineering Society" to "Advancing Indigenous Science and Engineering Society".

== Chapters ==
As of 2011, AISES has 177 chartered college and university chapters and 13 professional chapters in the US and Canada. In addition, 150 affiliated K-12 schools enroll in excess of 45,000 Native American students.

== Winds of Change magazine ==
AISES publishes Winds of Change, a quarterly magazine on science, technology, engineering and math fields and Native Americans.

== Scholarships ==
In 2012, AISES administered four merit-based, college scholarship programs:

- A.T. Anderson Memorial Scholarship—offered since 1983 to its members in the fields of math, science, medicine, engineering, physical science, natural resources, and technology.
- AISES Google Scholarship
- AISES Intel Scholarship
- Burlington Northern Santa Fe Foundation Scholarship

== Awards ==
At the annual AISES Leadership Summit, two student awards are voted on for students, by students. The awards are the Rising Leader Award and Leadership Award. In 2018, soil scientist Lydia Jennings was awarded the Rising Leader Award.

In 2011, the San Juan College branch of AISES earned the National Student Chapter of the Year award, the first community college to earn the national award formerly given at top schools such as Stanford University and the University of California, Los Angeles.

== See also ==
- American Indian Council of Architects and Engineers
