= Polingaysi Qöyawayma =

Hopi educator, writer, and potter (1892–1990)

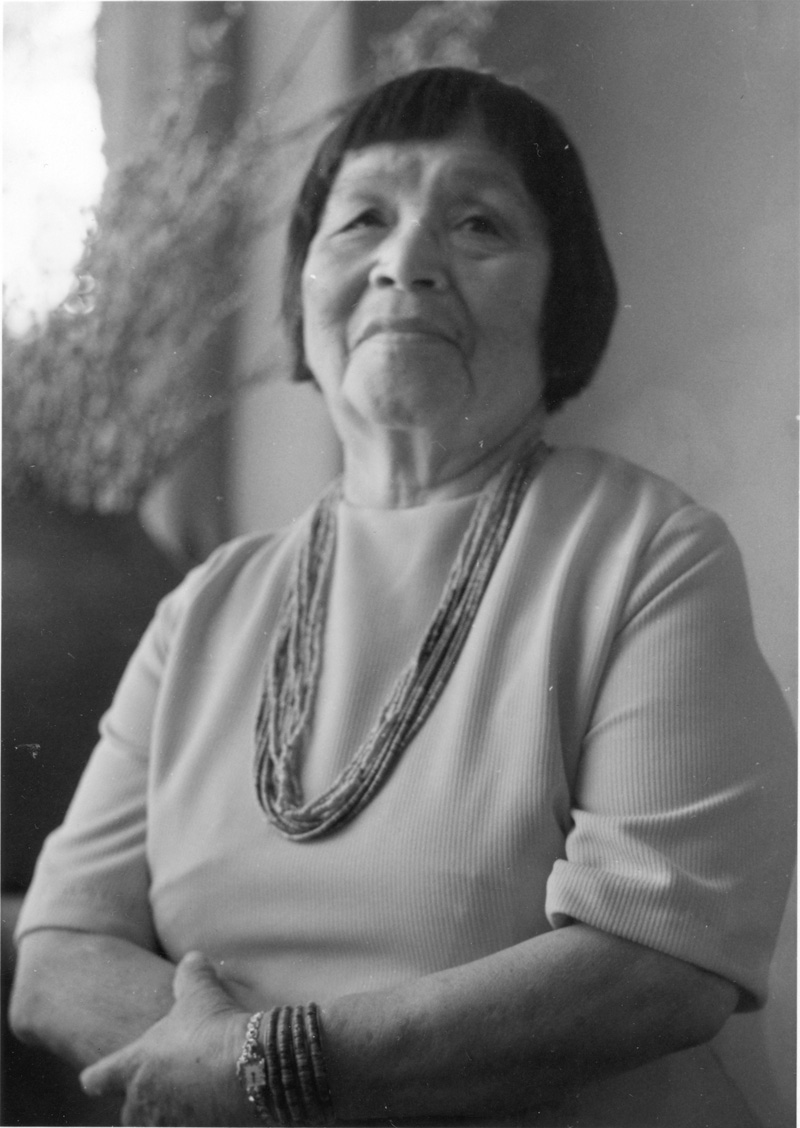
- c. 1970
- Born: 1892; Oraibi, Hopi Reservation, Arizona
- Died: December 6, 1990 (aged 98); Phoenix, Arizona
- Burial place: Kykotsmovi Village Cemetery
- Other name: Elizabeth Q. White
- Education: Bethel College
- Occupations: Educator; writer; potter
- Notable work: The Sun Girl, No Turning Back
- Spouse: Lloyd White (m. 1931, div. c. 1933)
- Relatives: Al Qöyawayma (nephew)

Polingaysi Qöyawayma (/poʊˈlɪŋ.naɪ.ʃiː koʊ.ˈjɑː waɪ.mɑː/ poh-LING-neye-shee koh-YAH-why-mah; 1892 – December 6, 1990), also known as Elizabeth Q. White, was a Hopi educator, writer, and potter.

== Biography ==
Born to parents Fred (of the Kachina Clan) and Sevenka (of the Coyote Clan), Polingaysi Qöyawayma grew up in Oraibi, a village on Arizona's Hopi Reservation. Her given name means "butterfly sitting among the flowers in the breeze".

Qöyawayma's father worked for Mennonite missionary Henry Voth, who built a school in Oraibi and attempted to win converts to Christianity. Many in the village saw Voth's efforts to enforce attendance as heavy-handed, and this caused a rift between Hopis who opposed and supported the school.

In 1906, Qöyawayma joined a group of students traveling to study at the Sherman Institute in Riverside, California. In her four years at the school, she lived with a teacher's family, learning English and converting to Christianity. After returning home to Oraibi, she had difficulty readjusting to traditional Hopi life. Villagers saw her as having adopted white people's ways, and were unreceptive to her Christian teachings.

She left to live with a Mennonite family in Newton, Kansas, and to receive missionary training at Bethel College. In 1919 she worked as a substitute teacher in Tuba City and attended the Los Angeles Bible Institute. She had second thoughts about missionary life, however, when she continued to be unsuccessful in converting any Oraibi residents, while attempting "to blend the best of Hopi tradition with the best of the white culture, retaining the essence of good, whatever the source."

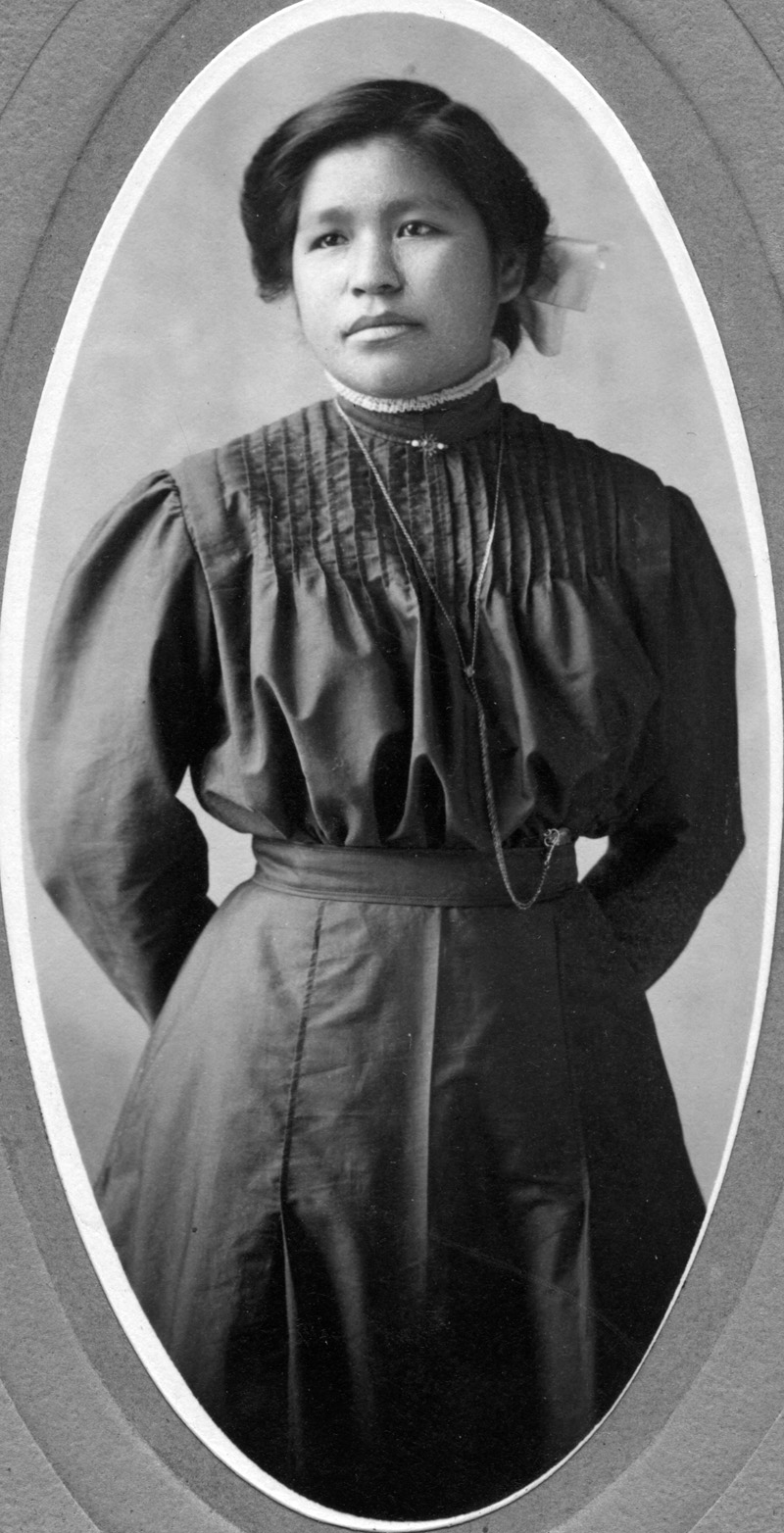
c. 1914

== Teaching career ==
In 1924 Qöyawayma began working at the Indian school in Hotevilla, first as a housekeeper and later as a teacher. Unusually for the time, she taught bilingually, introducing subjects to students in their native Hopi and then transitioning to English. This caused friction with her fellow teachers, and with some parents who preferred that their children be taught white language and customs exclusively, in order to be more successful in American society. She persisted, believing that Native American students were more receptive to concepts which were related in terms of traditional stories and legends. She became a government employee after passing the Indian Service test in 1925, and continued to teach in Hopi and Navajo schools until 1954. She later articulated her teaching philosophy:

I tell the young people this: Evaluate the best there is in your own culture and hang onto it, for it will be foremost in our life; but do not fail to take the best from other cultures to blend with what you already have. Don't set limitations on yourself. If you want more and still more education, reach out for it without fear. You have in you the qualities of persistence and endurance. Use them.

Her methods eventually met with acceptance and acclaim. In 1941, the Bureau of Indian Affairs chose Qöyawayma to demonstrate bilingual teaching to school officials across the country.

In 1974, Qöyawayma helped create a scholarship fund for Hopi students at Northern Arizona University. This was later renamed the Elizabeth White Hopi Scholarship in her honor.

== Writing ==
In 1941, Polingaysi Qöyawayma wrote the novel The Sun Girl: A True Story about Dawamana, about difficult decisions faced by a young Hopi girl.

Her autobiography No Turning Back, which she related to author Vada F. Carlson, was published in 1964. Literary critic Robert Kirsch praised it as "one of the rare and important documents of the Indian experience. It belongs alongside Theodora Kroeber's Ishi as an account of the collision of two cultures."

She also co-wrote Broken Pattern: Sunlight & Shadows of Hopi History with Carlson in 1985.

== Pottery ==
After her retirement from teaching, Qöyawayma dedicated herself to music and art, particularly pottery. She created a unique style, using pink clay with raised symbols such as corn and Kokopelli figures. The Heard Museum in Phoenix held an exhibition of her work in the late 1970s, and some of her pots are included in its permanent collection. She frequently hosted anthropology students at her home, as well as writers such as Ernest Hemingway.

== Personal life ==
Qöyawayma married Lloyd White, a part-Cherokee man, in 1931. They divorced one or two years later.

Her nephew Al Qöyawayma is a successful potter and sculptor.

Polingaysi Qöyawayma remained healthy into her eighties, but had a stroke in 1981. She died in a Phoenix nursing home in 1990, at age 98. She was buried at the Kykotsmovi Village Cemetery.

== Awards and recognition ==
- Department of the Interior Distinguished Service Award (1954)
- Una Hanbury bronze sculpture commissioned by Museum of Northern Arizona (1976)
- Arizona Indian Living Treasure Award (1978)
- Heard Museum Gold Medal (1978)
- Bethel College Outstanding Alumna (1979)
- Bullock's "Be Beautiful" Award (1984)
- Arizona Author Award for The Sun Girl (1989)
- Inducted into the Arizona Women's Hall of Fame (1991)
