= Caobilla =

Caobilla is a common name for several trees native to the American tropics and may refer to:

- Carapa guianensis
- Swietenia humilis
