= San Juan College =

Public college in Farmington, New Mexico, US

Coordinates: 36°46′16″N 108°10′10″W

- Former names: New Mexico College of Agriculture and Mechanic Arts, Farmington Branch; NMSU, Farmington Branch; NMSU, San Juan Branch
- Type: Public Community college
- Established: 1956 (part of NMSU)
- President: Toni Pendergrass
- Faculty: 142 full-time, 299 part-time (Fall 2021)
- Administrative staff: 321 full-time, 206 part-time (Fall 2021)
- Total staff: 463 full-time, 505 part-time (Fall 2021)
- Students: 5,846 (headcount, Fall 2021)
- Location: Farmington, New Mexico, United States
- Campus: Main campus and four branches
- Website: www.sanjuancollege.edu

San Juan College is a public community college in Farmington, New Mexico. Founded in 1956 as a branch of the New Mexico College of Agriculture and Mechanical Arts, San Juan College became an independent community college following a county election in 1981.

== Awards ==
In 2011, the San Juan College branch of the American Indian Science and Engineering Society earned the National Student Chapter of the Year award, and is the first community college to earn the national award formerly given at top schools such as Stanford University and the University of California, Los Angeles.

== Campuses ==
- Main Campus, Farmington, New Mexico
- 30th Street Education Center, Farmington, New Mexico
- East Campus, Aztec, New Mexico
- West Campus, Kirtland, New Mexico
- 800 S. Hutton Street Complex, Farmington, New Mexico

== Dual-credit program ==
San Juan College offers a dual-credit program to high school students who wish to earn college credits while they are still in high school. This program serves seven public school districts in Northwestern New Mexico, as well as nearby private and home-schooled students. Public school students do not pay for tuition and supplies (textbooks, etc.) as they are waived by the state. The San Juan College High school program is along the same lines. Districts across San Juan County send up to ten students to attend, where they earn their associates degree along with a high school diploma.
