= Arenal Volcano =

Volcano in Costa Rica

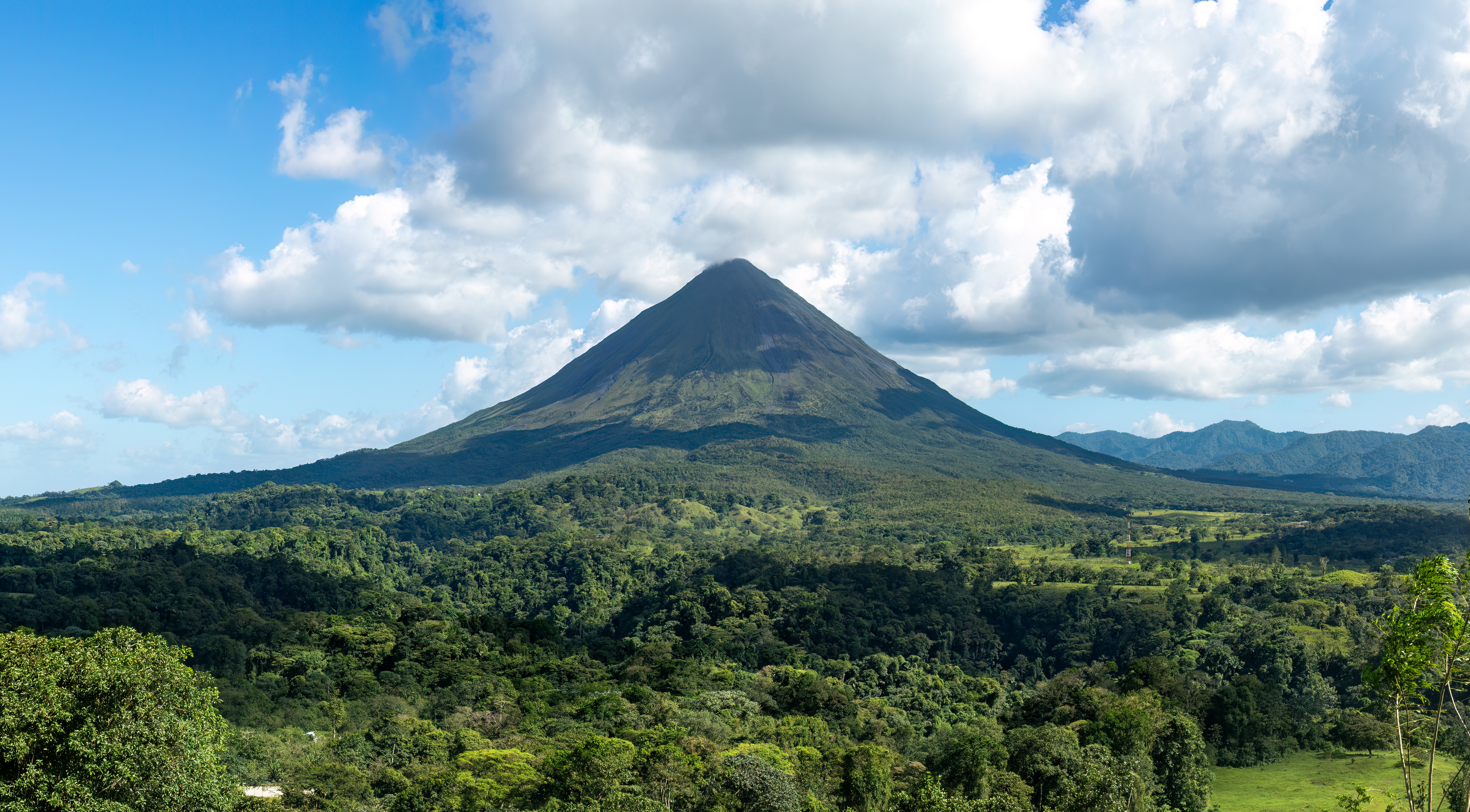

Highest point
- Elevation: 1,633 m (5,358 ft)
- Coordinates: 10°27′45″N 84°42′12″W

Geography
- Location within Costa Rica
- Location: Alajuela Province, Costa Rica

Geology
- Rock age: 7,000 years old
- Mountain type: Stratovolcano
- Volcanic arc: Central America Volcanic Arc
- Last eruption: 1968 to 2010

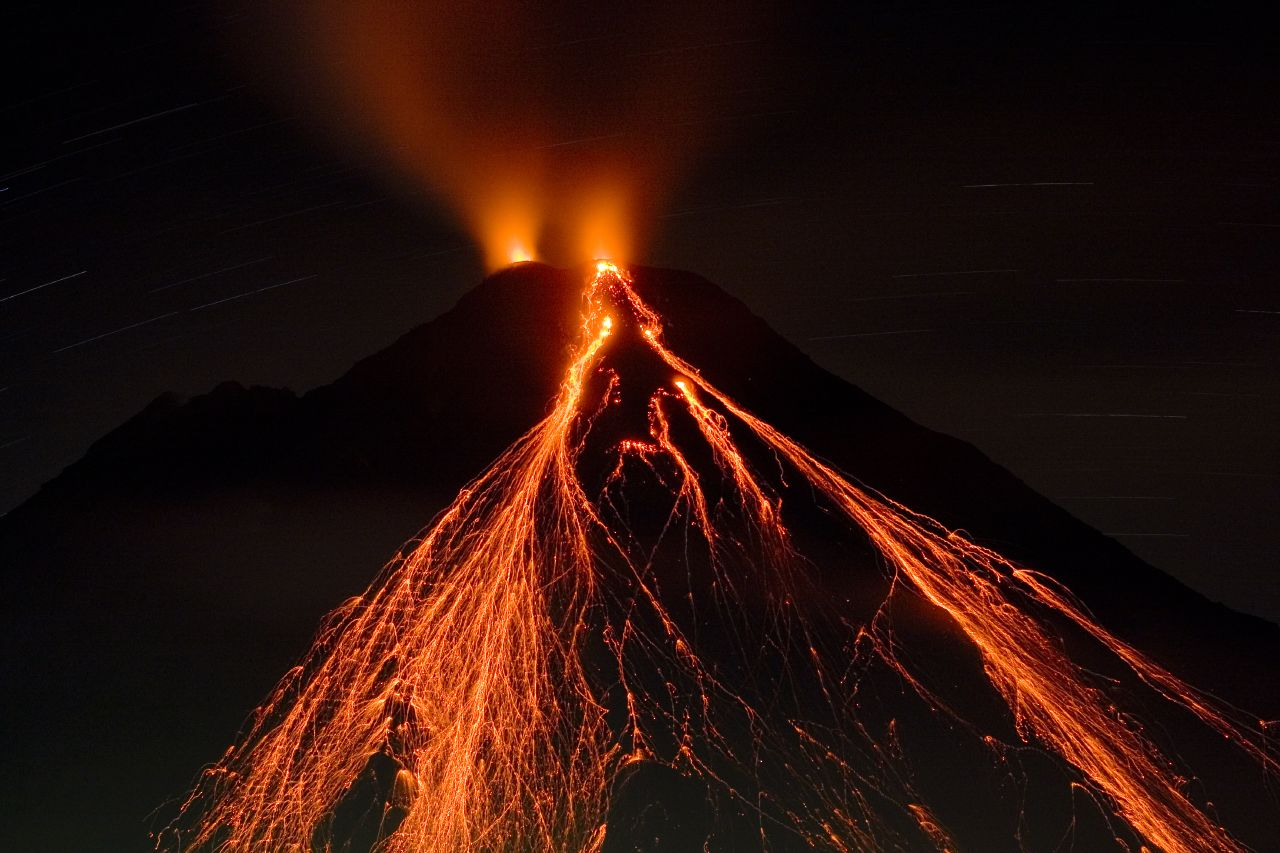
Arenal in November 2006

Arenal Volcano (Spanish: Volcán Arenal) is a recently active andesitic stratovolcano in north-western Costa Rica around 90 km (56 mi) northwest of San José, in the province of Alajuela, canton of San Carlos, and district of La Fortuna. The Arenal volcano stands 1,633 metres (5,358 ft) high. It is conically shaped with a crater 140 metres (460 ft) in diameter. Geologically, Arenal is considered a young volcano and it is estimated to be less than 7,500 years old. It is also known as "Pan de Azúcar", "Canaste", "Volcan Costa Rica", "Volcan Río Frío" or "Guatusos Peak".

The volcano was dormant for hundreds of years and exhibited two craters at its summit, with minor fumaroles activity, covered by dense vegetation. In 1968 it erupted unexpectedly, destroying the small town of Tabacón. Due to the eruption three more craters were created on the western flanks but only one of them exists today. By duration, Arenal's eruption from 1968 to 2010 is the tenth longest volcanic eruption on Earth since 1750. Since 2010, Arenal has been dormant.

== Geographic setting and description ==
Arenal is one of seven historically active Costa Rican volcanoes along with Poás, Irazú, Miravalles, Orosí, Rincón de la Vieja complex, and Turrialba. It was Costa Rica's most active volcano until 2010, and one of the ten most active volcanoes in the world. It has been studied by seismologists for many years. The volcano is located at the center of Arenal Volcano National Park in the northern zone of the country, 15 kilometres (9.3 mi) southwest of the La Fortuna district in San Carlos (canton), Costa Rica.

Arenal Volcano area is an important watershed for the Arenal Lake Reservoir. The reservoir's water is used for hydroelectric power. It is also connected to the national system.

Geologically, the volcanic complex sits along the structural transition zone between the Cordillera de Tilarán and the Cordillera Volcánica de Guanacaste, where regional fault systems feed an extensive geothermal and hydrothermal network surrounding the basin.

Arenal has several eruptive vents. Chato is a dormant stratovolcanic cone. It is believed that Chato first erupted 38,000 years ago during the Pleistocene period and last erupted about 3,500 years ago. Chatito is a lava dome with an elevation of 1,100 metres (3,609 ft). Espina is another lava dome.

A study published in 2022 analyzed the long-term eruptive behavior of Arenal Volcano, which remained active from 1968 until 2010. The study identified Arenal as an open-vent system, meaning that magma was consistently supplied to the surface without major explosive events. Researchers examined how magma ascent, degassing, and structural changes influenced the volcano's eruptive patterns. The study also suggested that while Arenal is currently dormant, future activity is likely due to its persistent magmatic supply.

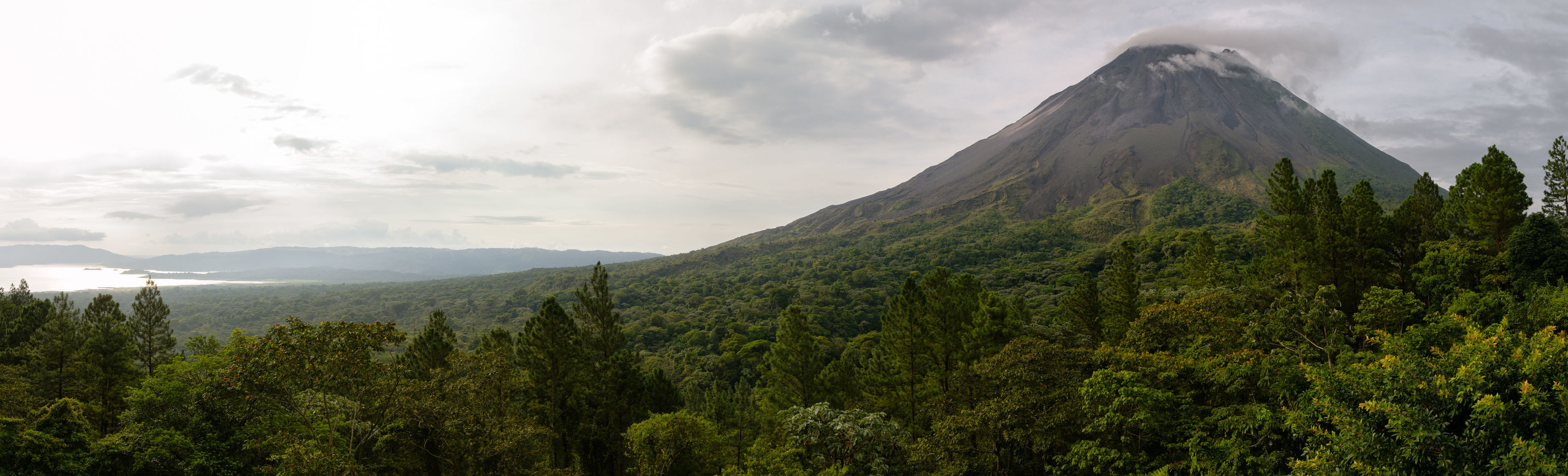
Arenal Volcano with Lake Arenal on the left

== Geological history ==
Arenal is the youngest of all the volcanoes in Costa Rica. Scientists have been able to date its activity back more than 7000 years. The area remained largely unexplored until 1937, when a documented expedition took place to reach the summit. It was eruptive from 1968 until 2010.

=== July 29, 1968 ===
1968 eruption of Arenal Volcano
- Start date: July 29, 1968
- Start time: 7:30
- End date: July 31, 1968
- Type: Plinian/Pelean
- VEI: 3
- Impact: 87 people killed; 3 villages destroyed

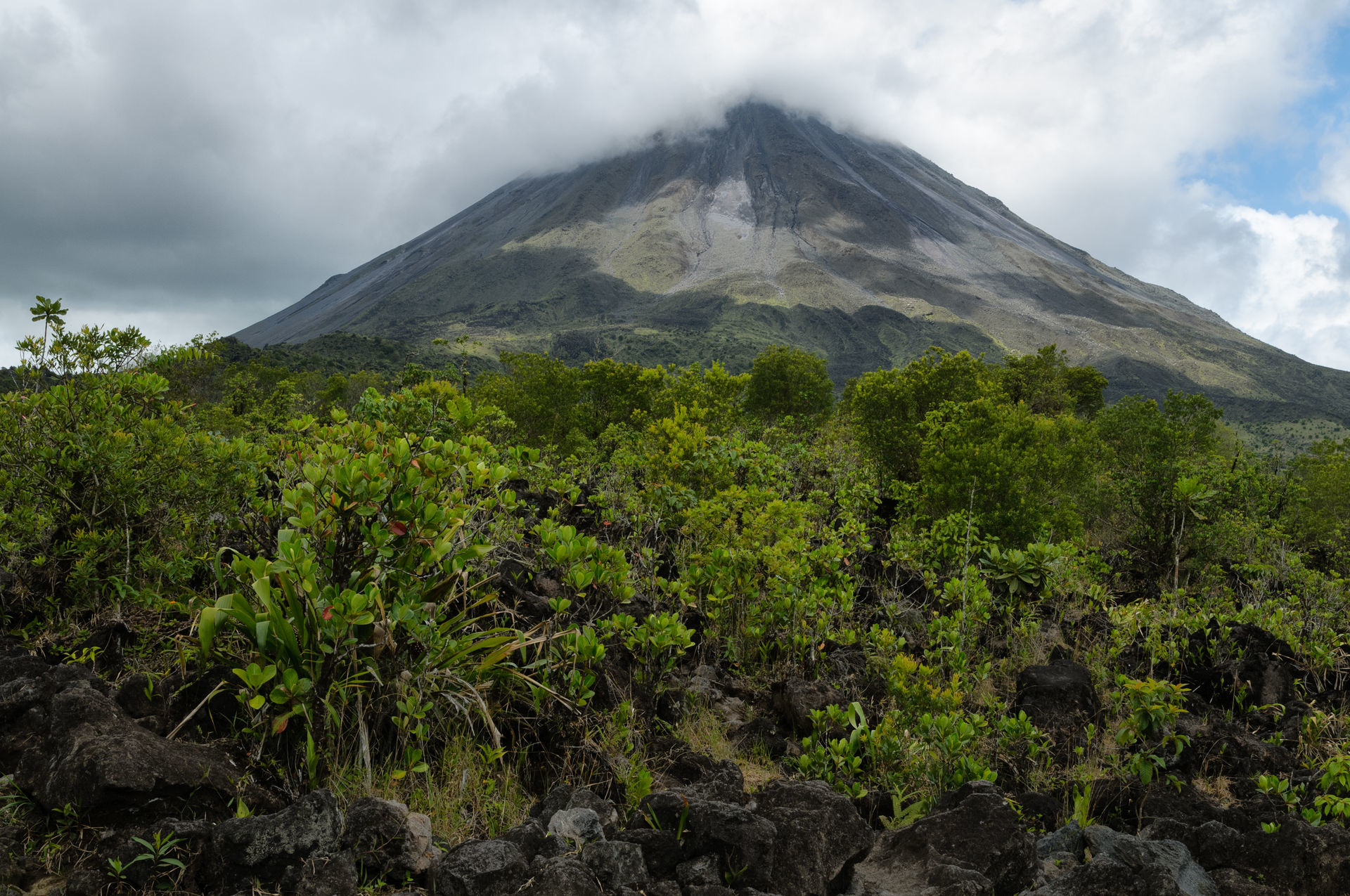
Arenal in 2014, viewed from the old 1968 lava flow

On Monday, July 29, 1968, at 7:30 a.m., the Arenal Volcano suddenly and violently erupted. The eruptions continued unabated for several days, burying over 15 square kilometers (5.8 sq mi) under rocks, lava and ash. When it was finally over, the eruptions had killed 87 people and buried 3 small villages – Tabacón, Pueblo Nuevo and San Luís – and affected more than 232 square kilometers (90 sq mi) of land. Crops were spoiled, property was ruined, and large numbers of livestock were killed.

At the height of its ferocious activity, the volcano flung giant rocks – some weighing several tons – more than a kilometer (half a mile) away at a rate of 600 meters per second (2,000 ft/s; 1,300 mph). These explosions would go on to form three new active craters.

As the three towns were destroyed on the western side of the volcano, a town by the name of El Borio on the east side was untouched and unharmed. It is a popular myth that after the volcano ceased to erupt, El Borio was renamed La Fortuna, which means "The Fortune", referring to its luckiness that the volcano erupted to the west and not the east. In reality the town was renamed La Fortuna by its residents before the 1968 eruption. "The Fortune" refers to the flat, fertile lands in the area, which are unlike the rough, mountainous terrain which surrounds most of the Arenal volcano.

=== June 1975 ===
Between June 17 and 21, 1975, several landslides went down from one of the craters. The vegetation along Tabacon River was destroyed and a great amount of material was deposited on the riverbed. Four strong explosions also blew large amounts of ash into the sky. The ash was spread across a distance of 26 kilometers (16 mi).

=== March 1996 ===
At this time the volcano started to produce regular lava flows, accompanied by intermittent explosions of gases. This was the regular activity of the volcano until May 5, 1998.

=== May 5, 1998 ===
The Arenal Volcano experienced a series of large eruptions on Tuesday afternoon, May 5, 1998. The first ratchet eruption was recorded at 1:05 p.m. when part of the northwest wall of the crater fell apart. Large amounts of lava, rocks, and ash flew out of the volcano during this explosion. Another eruption took place at 2:20 p.m. with material emerging from the same part of the volcano.

A specialist from the Volcanological and Seismological Observatory of Costa Rica (OVISCORI) at the National University of Costa Rica explained that the eruptions are nothing unusual for the volcano. Nevertheless, during this occasion, the amount of lava within the crater was significantly greater than normal and therefore more material was poured out. This time a landslide took place, too, as a part of the crater wall falling apart on the northwest side. This phenomenon occurs sporadically, although this time the consequences were greater than usual.

As a normal precaution, authorities declared a red alert, closed the road between La Fortuna and Tilarán, which runs around the north side of the volcano, and evacuated approximately 450 people (mostly tourists) from the immediate area, including several hotels and tourism-oriented businesses. There were no reports of injuries caused by the volcanic activity.

At 5:20 p.m. on Tuesday the volcano was still discharging material, but activity had decreased significantly.

=== May 7, 1998 ===
The eruptions of May 7, 1998, damaged 2 square kilometers (0.77 sq mi) and destroyed a 400-by-100-meter (1,310 by 330 ft) area of green forest in the vicinity of Arenal Volcano. A fissure, 500 meters (1,600 ft) long and 10 meters (33 ft) deep, was opened up in the wall of the crater and all the material slid down the side of the volcano.

During this day, 23 eruptions were reported, between 1:05 p.m. and 7:00 p.m., and thereafter the volcano returned to its normal state. Authorities reported no unusual behavior and the national park was reopened the same week. Local seismologists investigated the activity of the volcano and park rangers continued to vigorously enforce the safety perimeter.

=== October 2010 ===
October 2010 was the last eruption reported, and the presence of fumaroles was reported at the summit. Arenal was placed under Green Alert (calm status) by local authorities.

=== September 2013 ===
In September 2013, Arenal Volcano displayed signs of activity following a period of dormancy. On September 8 and 9, plumes composed primarily of water vapor were observed rising from the northeastern and southeastern edges of Crater C. Additionally, tremors associated with hydrothermal and magmatic activity were recorded on September 8. In the following weeks, an increase in rockfalls and rumbling noises was documented. While no eruption occurred, these observations indicated ongoing geothermal processes within the volcano.

== Regional climate ==
The area surrounding Arenal Volcano in Costa Rica is characterized by a humid and cloudy climate, influenced by its tropical location and varying elevations.

=== Humidity ===
Throughout the year, the region experiences high humidity levels. For instance, in May, the average relative humidity is around 83%, contributing to a muggy atmosphere. The rainy season, spanning from May to November, often feels more humid due to frequent showers, while the dry season from December to April can feel slightly less humid.

=== Cloud cover ===
Cloudiness is a common feature in the Arenal area, especially during the wet season. In May, for example, the sky is clear or partly cloudy only about 18% of the day, indicating prevalent cloud cover. Elevations within Arenal Volcano National Park also impact cloudiness; higher altitudes near the volcano tend to be cooler with increased cloud cover, while lower elevations are warmer and more humid.

== Cultural and archaeological significance ==
The Maleku people, indigenous to the Arenal region, consider the volcano a sacred site. Their traditional lands once included Arenal, and they continue to preserve spiritual beliefs connected to the volcano. They reside in the Guatuso Indigenous Reserve and advocate for cultural preservation. Their cultural practices and language remain integral to their identity, despite external challenges.

Archaeological studies in the Arenal region have uncovered evidence of human occupation dating back 5,500 years. The Arenal Prehistory Project (1984–1987) found that volcanic activity shaped settlement patterns, with evidence of early agriculture and pottery linked to Mesoamerican trade.

Today, the Arenal area offers various cultural experiences that allow visitors to engage with local traditions. Activities include learning to make traditional Costa Rican tortillas, participating in cooking classes, and exploring local farms. These experiences provide insight into the daily lives and heritage of the communities living in the volcano's shadow.

== See also ==
- List of volcanoes in Costa Rica
- Lake Arenal
- Arenal Volcano National Park
- Arenal Prehistory Project
