= Al Qöyawayma =

Hopi artist and engineer

- Born: February 26, 1938 (age 88); Los Angeles, California, U.S.
- Occupations: Potter and sculptor

Alfred H. Qöyawayma is a Hopi potter and bronze sculptor. He was born in Los Angeles on February 26, 1938. Qöyawayma is also a mechanical engineer who has worked in the development of inertial guidance systems and a co-founder of the American Indian Science and Engineering Society.

== Early life ==
Qöyawayma, the only child of Mayme and Alfred (originally Poliyumptewa), was raised in the San Fernando Valley and attended Van Nuys High School. He is a 1961 graduate of California Polytechnic State University in San Luis Obispo, California. He has a master's degree in engineering from the University of Southern California. His aunt was the noted educator and potter Polingaysi Qöyawayma.

== Artistic career ==
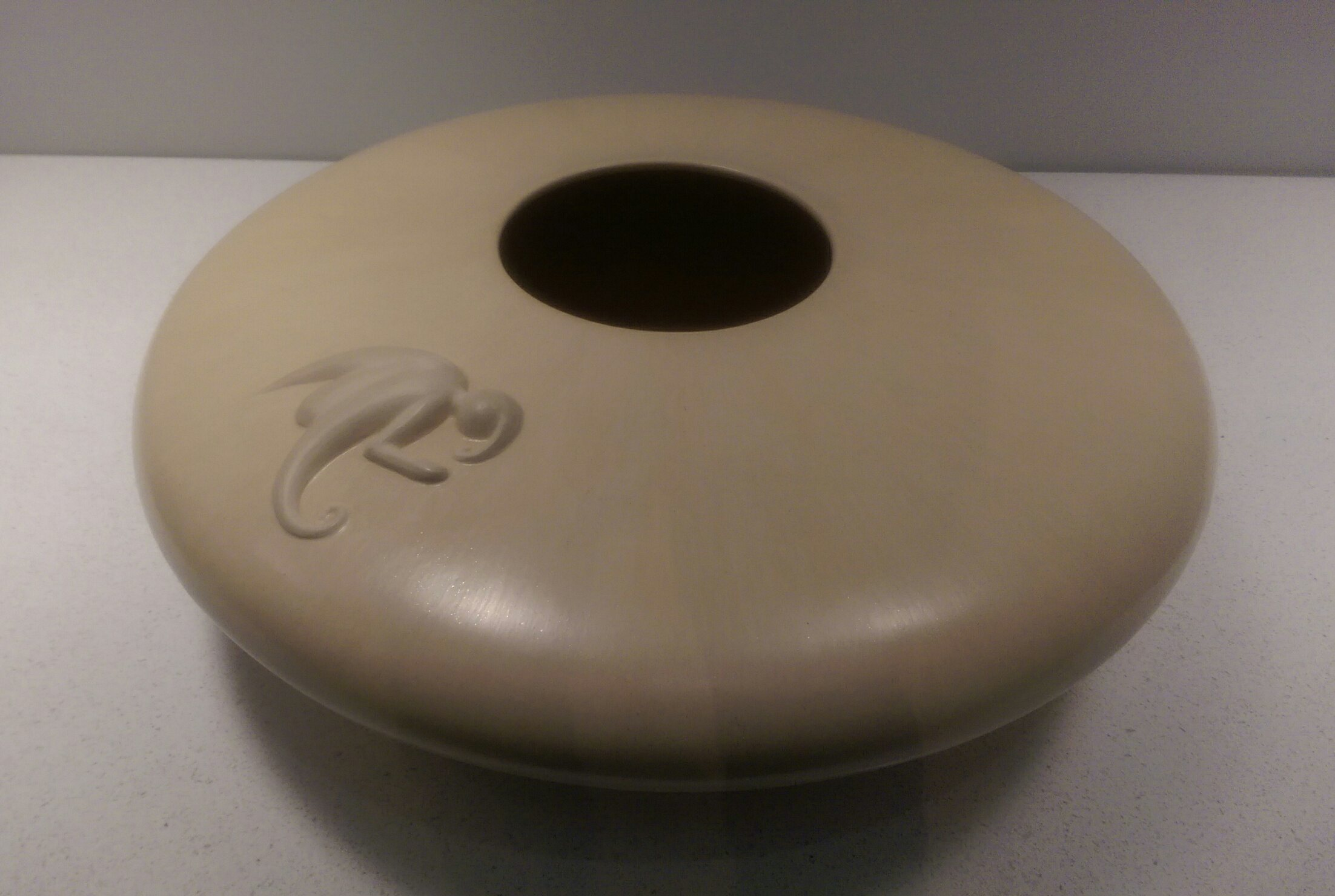
A 1983 vessel by Al Qöyawayma on display at the Crocker Art Museum in Sacramento, California

His artistic work incorporates "crosscultural elements" and a "minimalist" style. Many of his pots include representations of maize, which is a sacred part of Hopi religion. "For the people of the mesas corn is sustenance, ceremonial object, prayer offering, symbol, and sentient being unto itself. Corn is the Mother in the truest sense that people take in the corn and the corn becomes their flesh, as mother milk becomes the flesh of the child."

Qöyawayma finds the clay and processes it himself. He uses a spiral coiling technique, and fires his pots at a "very high temperature" which "results in vitrification of the clay which creates a smooth and polished surface." He uses coal to produce these high temperatures, which is a technique long used by his Coyote clan of the Hopi.

Qöyawayma learned traditional Hopi ceramics and legends from his aunt Polingyasi Elizabeth Qöyawayma (Elizabeth Q. White). She is the author of a book published in 1964 called No Turning Back: A Hopi Woman's Struggle to Live in Two Worlds in which she wrote: "Evaluate the best there is in your own culture and hang onto it, for it will be foremost in our life; but do not fail to take the best from other cultures to blend with what you already have. Don't set limitations on yourself"

Pottery expert Lee M. Cohen has written that "Nothing quite like Al Qoyawayma's pottery has ever existed before, though his work could not possibly assume its sublime form without the artist's profound appreciation for the ways of his Hopi ancestors."

=== Space pottery ===
In 2002, astronaut John Herrington, a member of the Chickasaw tribe, took one of Qöyawayma's ceramic pots into orbit aboard Space Shuttle mission STS-113, which docked with the International Space Station. That pot, described as a "miniature Sikyatki-style seed jar with corn motif" is now in the collection of the National Museum of the American Indian.

=== Ceramics training and consulting ===
Qöyawayma received a Fulbright fellowship to assist the Maori people of New Zealand rebuild their tradition of ceramic pottery making. He has consulted with the Smithsonian Institution on ancient Sikyátki ceramics.

== Exhibitions ==
- Night of the First Americans, Kennedy Center, Washington, DC, 1982
- First Showing of Contemporary American Indian Art, National Museum of Natural History, Washington, DC, 1982–83
- Al Qoyawayma: A Retrospective, Taylor Museum at the Colorado Springs Fine Arts Center, Colorado Springs, 1985
- Head, Heart and Hands: Native American Craft Traditions in a Contemporary World, American Craft Museum, New York, 1999
- The Road to Aztlan Austin Museum of Art, Austin, Texas, 2001
- Jewels of the Southwest, Museum of Indian Arts and Culture, Santa Fe, 2002
- Changing Hands New Mexico Museum of Art, Santa Fe, 2003
- Inaugural Opening, National Museum of the American Indian, Washington, DC, "Space Pot", 2004
- HOME: Native People of the Southwest, Heard Museum, 2005
- Gift of the Gods: Exploring Maize, Culture and Indigenous Art in the Americas, Hearst Gallery, St. Mary's College of California, Moraga, California, 2011
