= Water resources management in Costa Rica =

- Withdrawals by sector 2000: Domestic: 29%; Agriculture: 53%; Industry: 18%
- Renewable water resources: 112 km^{3} (2008)
- Surface water produced internally: 75.1 km^{3} (2008)
- Groundwater recharge: 37.3 km^{3} (2008)
- Overlap shared by surface water and groundwater: 0 km^{3} (2008)
- Renewable water resources per capita: 24,873 m^{3}/year (2008)
- Wetland designated as Ramsar sites: 510,050 ha (2010)
- Hydropower generation: 70%–80%

Costa Rica is divided into three major drainage basins encompassing 34 watersheds with numerous rivers and tributaries, one major lake used for hydroelectric generation, and two major aquifers that serve to store 90% of the municipal, industrial, and agricultural water supply needs of Costa Rica. Agriculture is the largest water user demanding around 53% of total supplies while the sector contributes 6.5% to the Costa Rica GDP. About a fifth of land under cultivation is being irrigated by surface water. Hydroelectric power generation makes up a significant portion of electricity usage in Costa Rica and much of this comes from the Arenal dam.

Total water usage is very high in comparison to other Central American countries, but when measured against available freshwater sources, Costa Rica uses only 5% of its available supply. Urbanization is increasing and as it does, demand for water is expected to rise exponentially in the coming decades. There exists ample water but the threat of widespread contamination to the aquifers is legitimate as untreated wastewater, stormwater, and industrial effluents infiltrate subterranean supplies.

Additionally, the government and water management institutions are facing a water conveyance infrastructure that is in decline; Therefore, non-revenue water losses within the system are increasing. Modernization projects are underway led by the Environmental Ministry in Costa Rica with the assistance of multi-lateral development banks where the aim is to address this infrastructure challenge as well as to help mend a fragmented system of water management institutions.

In Costa Rica, 2020 projections for water demand for all uses are estimated to reach 39 cubic kilometres (9.4 cubic miles), equivalent to 35% of the total water resources available.[4] The key challenge is to properly manage the growth in demand from 5% to 35% of available water resources. Urban development continues to increase the pressure on water resources and the use of water and groundwater in particular is becoming increasingly more complex due to rapid urbanization and over-exploitation from domestic, industrial, and agricultural demand. by matthew.t

Unsustainable land use practices are threatening to degrade watersheds and are adding to the growing complexities of managing groundwater. Additionally, the volcanic aquifers consist mainly of interstratifications of gaps and fissures which allow for high permeability and infiltration. In many cases, these make the aquifers highly vulnerable to human contamination from the cities in which they support. The heterogeneity of these aquifers makes them complicated to study and manage. Consequently, growing signs of conflict and competition for water use between sector needs are being observed in some regions.

Another considerable challenge in Costa Rica is the lack of a monitoring and maintenance for potable water and the problem has precipitated a higher incidence of water-borne illnesses. In response, the Health Ministry created a system of vigilant monitoring of the quality of water, illnesses, population migration, environmental sanitation, vulnerability of the aquifers, lakes, and rivers. The Health Ministry also analyzes and approves environmental impact studies as they pertain to the drinking water supply, regulates the quality of water being delivered to citizens.

The state of the water conveyance infrastructure is not good and large amounts of water are lost or not accounted for. Water loss from the delivery and conveyance systems is referred to as non-revenue water and losses are estimated at 50%. This problem exists because of deficiencies in the physical structures, use of outdated technologies, and inadequate maintenance.

== Dispute with Nicaragua over the San Juan River ==
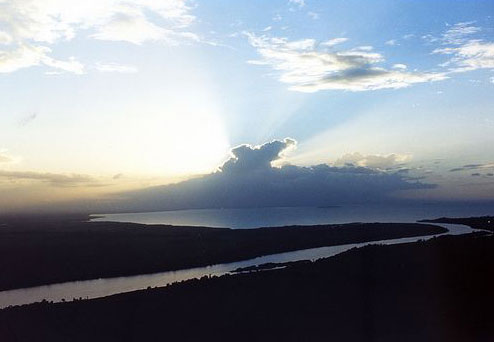
The San Juan River.

Dating back two hundred years, there have been disputes over the management and usage of the San Juan River forming the border between Nicaragua and Costa Rica. The San Juan River has long been viewed, for both countries, as offering the promise for a canal route across Central America. This was the case when the Panama Canal site was chosen rather than the San Juan River as the ultimate ship navigation route across the Americas. The conflict between Nicaragua and Costa Rica continues. The Nicaraguan government announced in August 2009 that it will begin construction at the end of September 2009 to reroute the San Juan River, which runs along the country's border with Costa Rica.

The head of the committee for development of the San Juan River in Nicaragua said that the $1 million project is intended to "recover the 1,700 m^{3} p/sec of water that was lost after Costa Rica rerouted it toward its Colorado River between 1945 and 1950." Costa Rica responded, issuing a statement that said a ruling by an international court "forcefully denies Nicaragua's wish to dredge a new route on the San Juan River." In July 2009 the United Nations’ International Court of Justice unanimously reaffirmed Nicaragua's sovereignty over the river and upheld the ban that does not allow Costa Rican police and military forces to use the river. Nicaragua's exclusive sovereignty over the San Juan River was established in 1858 with the Cañas-Jerez treaty.

According to the 151-year-old Cañas-Jerez treaty, the San Juan River is fully Nicaraguan property; however, Costa Rica can use the river freely for transport, without any restrictions from its neighbouring country. Costa Rica says Nicaragua is reneging on its obligations by requiring visas and forcing Costa Rican boats to stop for military inspection on the northern bank. All passengers are made to pay a $5 fee and every boat must fly the Nicaraguan flag. Nicaragua also banned commercial fishing by Costa Rican fisherman in retribution of Costa Rica initiating the ICJ suit in 2005.

== Water resource base ==
With an average width of 120 km, Costa Rica receives about 170 km^{3} from rain and about 75 km^{3} finds its way into the rivers and lakes of Costa Rica and yet another 37 km^{3} ends up in underground aquifers. The remaining water is lost through evaporation and evapotranspiration. Costa Rica is divided into three major slopes or basins. The Atlantic side is the wet and rainy side and rarely experiences a deficit of water throughout the year. The Atlantic sloping side incorporates the Northern slope that drains into the San Juan River bordering Nicaragua and also towards the Caribbean Sea. The sub-basins within this slope contribute 5.8 km^{3} annually to Lake Nicaragua and more than half of the water that flows into the San Juan River or around 23.2 km^{3} The Pacific slope is more dry with a shared decline in average flow during the dry season. In total, there are 34 principal drainage basins in Costa Rica with 17 having a major sloping contour and range in size from 207 km^{2} to 5,084 km^{2}.

=== Groundwater and Surface water resources ===
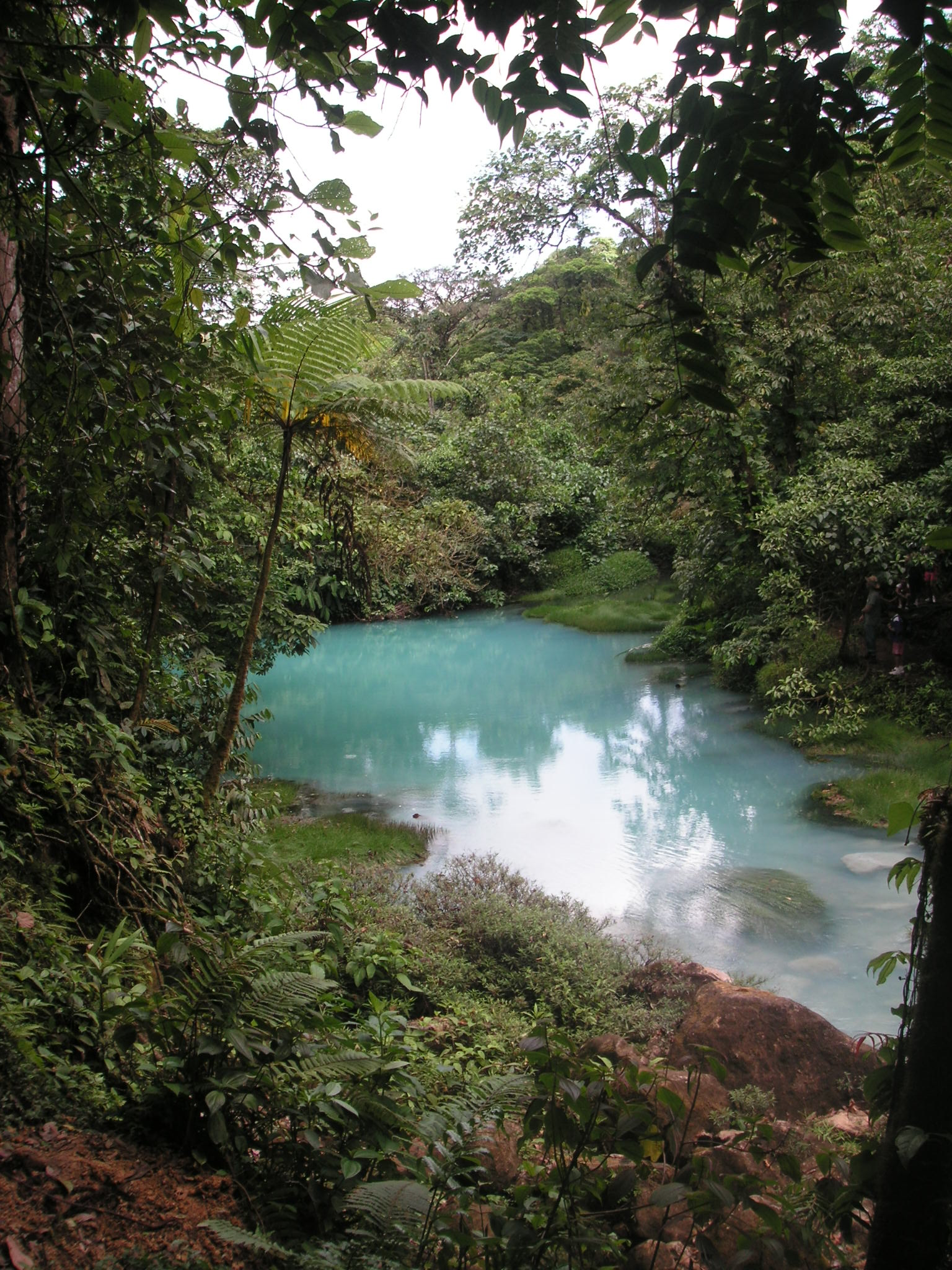
The Rio Celeste (sky blue river) at Tenorio Volcano National Park in Costa Rica.

Groundwater is the primary water source in Costa Rica where it accounts for nearly 90% of Costa Rica's agricultural, industrial, and domestic water demands with the exception of hydroelectric generation. Volcanic activity has formed highly permeable subterranean layers within the fragmented igneous lava. This phenomenon coupled with high rainfall has created the formation of aquifers in the central and northern part of Costa Rica's Central Valley, where more than half of the population lives. These aquifers are called the Upper and Lower Colima and are separated by a layer that acts as a semi-permeable aquitard, which allows the descending and ascending vertical transfer of water.

It has been estimated that the Lower Colima extends for approximately 230 km^{2} and that the Upper Colima spreads over approximately 170 km^{2}. The Upper Colima aquifer is recharged from the Barva and La Libertad aquifers by vertical percolation. The Upper Colima also receives a large part of its recharge from rain infiltration in those areas where there are no overlying smaller aquifers. The Lower Colima is recharged from the Upper Colima by vertical percolation and from surface water where the Upper Colima is absent.

The average recharge of the aquifer system was calculated in 1990 at 8200 L/s. The depth of the water table level varies, depending on the surface topographical irregularities; but, generally it ranges between 50 and 100 m. The direction of the underground flow is from north-east to south-west in both aquifers. Surface water is represented by approximately 13 major rivers, with many adjoining tributaries that range in length from 50 to 160 km (31 to 99 mi). Costa Rica's major reservoir is Lake Arenal.

=== Water quality ===
While drinking water is good in many parts of the country, there are still many concerns about the quality of water in streams and lakes. It has been estimated that surface water pollution is a threefold problem. Untreated effluents from urban wastewater (only 3% of wastewaters receive treatment) account for 20% of the problem, 40% from solid waste and industrial effluents (heavy metals are the primary culprit), and 40% from the agricultural sector. In the agriculture sector alone, 70% of pollution comes from debris of coffee plantations. Water basins that are receiving large quantities of contaminated runoff include the Grande de Tárcoles and Large Terraba rivers.

Key characteristics of the major climatic regions
Region	Land area (km^{2})	Rainfall by depth (mm/year)	Rainfall by volume (km^{3}/year)	Surface run off (km^{3}/year)	Infiltration (km^{3}/year)	Evapotranspiration (km^{3}/year)
Chorotega	9,552.4	2,006	19.2	5.7	3.5	10.3
Huetar Norte	9,001.5	3,527	31.8	14.9	9.6	7.5
Huetar Atlántico	9,688.5	3,933	38.1	17.6	9.3	11.1
Pacífico Central	4,722.9	2,801	13.2	5.2	2.2	4.9
Central	8,543.2	3,461	29.6	13	7	8.6
Brunca	9,294.5	3,809	35.4	18.6	5.6	12.2
Total	50,803	19,537	167.2	75.1	37.3	54.7

Source: FAO

== Water resources management by sector ==
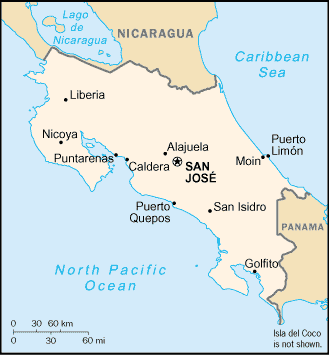
A map of Costa Rica.

=== Drinking water and usage ===
In general, water quality is acceptable for drinking in the urban areas as well as many rural areas. The Government of Costa Rica understands tourism to be the primary driver of the national economy, and more attention has been paid to improve the potable water systems throughout the country. Costa Rica has the highest demand of water, both in total and per capita measures. Per capita water usage is about 1860 L p/day amounting to 5% of total available groundwater and surfacewater. Remaining Central American countries use on average of 3% of total supplies.

About 60% of the Costa Rican population lives in urban areas. Considerable focus has been targeted to expand water services to cities over the last decade. Approximately 99% of the urban populations are connected to water services, which is higher than the 90% average for the rest of Latin America. Connection to the public water supply in rural areas of Costa Rica is about 92% representing about 1.56 million inhabitants.

		Urban (61% of the population)	Rural (39% of the population)	Total
Water	Broad definition	100%	92%	97%
Water	House connections	99%	81%	92%
Sanitation	Broad definition	89%	97%	92%
Sanitation	Sewerage	48%	1%	30%

=== Irrigation ===
Agriculture accounts for 6.5% of Costa Rica's GDP and 14% of the workforce. Costa Rica irrigates around 21% of its land under cultivation relying primarily on surface water.

The irrigation sector is managed by The National Irrigation and Drainage Service (SENARA).

Two striving irrigation districts of note that are different in size, and means of execution are: 1) Arenal-Tempisque Irrigation District (DRAT) which is a much larger district than the latter and grows staple crops; 2) and the Irrigation and Drainage of Small Areas (PARD) is smaller but benefits more families than DRAT and focuses on higher value crops.

Arenal-Tempisque Irrigation District (DRAT):

This system is located in Guanacaste province, the driest area of the country (during 5 months a year), and is nearly 100% supplied by surface water, utilizing water from the reservoir Lake Arenal. DRAT has increased its surface area from 10,000 hectares (25,000 acres) in 2003, to 28,000 hectares (69,000 acres) today. DRAT benefits approximately 1,125 families producing mainly sugarcane, fodder, rice, and fish(400 ha of aquaculture), generating income of approximately $163.7 million from this region. The producers in the area pay SENARA a fixed rate fee of $42.5/ha/year for water used in irrigation. Financial resources of $13.7 million are being negotiated for the expansion of DRAT.

The Irrigation and Drainage of Small Areas (PARD)

is a district promoted by SENARA and is a response to requests made by associations of producers, individual producers, and state institutions. SENARA is in charge here of constructing the irrigation canal. These are not state properties, they belong to the producers who are in charge of properly maintaining the irrigation system. PARD encompasses an area of 2,686.4 hectares (6,638 acres) and benefits 2023 families who mainly cultivate vegetables, root crops, tubers, decorative plants and prickly pears.

The areas where DRAT and PARD operate include approximately 30,686 hectares (75,830 acres) and the total water demand is estimated at 35.2 m^{3}/s. Of this total demand, the Ministry of Environment and Energy (MINAE) has granted 1240 concessions for exploiting surface and groundwaters for agricultural use; however, less than 97% of the water in Costa Rica utilized for irrigation comes from surfacewater.

=== Stormwater Drainage ===
The Atlantic side of Costa Rica experiences stormwater drainage problems where water tables are not very deep. The geography is much flatter here, and the propensity for flooding is higher. Total area inflicted with drainage problems is estimated around 300,000 hectares (740,000 acres).

=== Hydropower ===
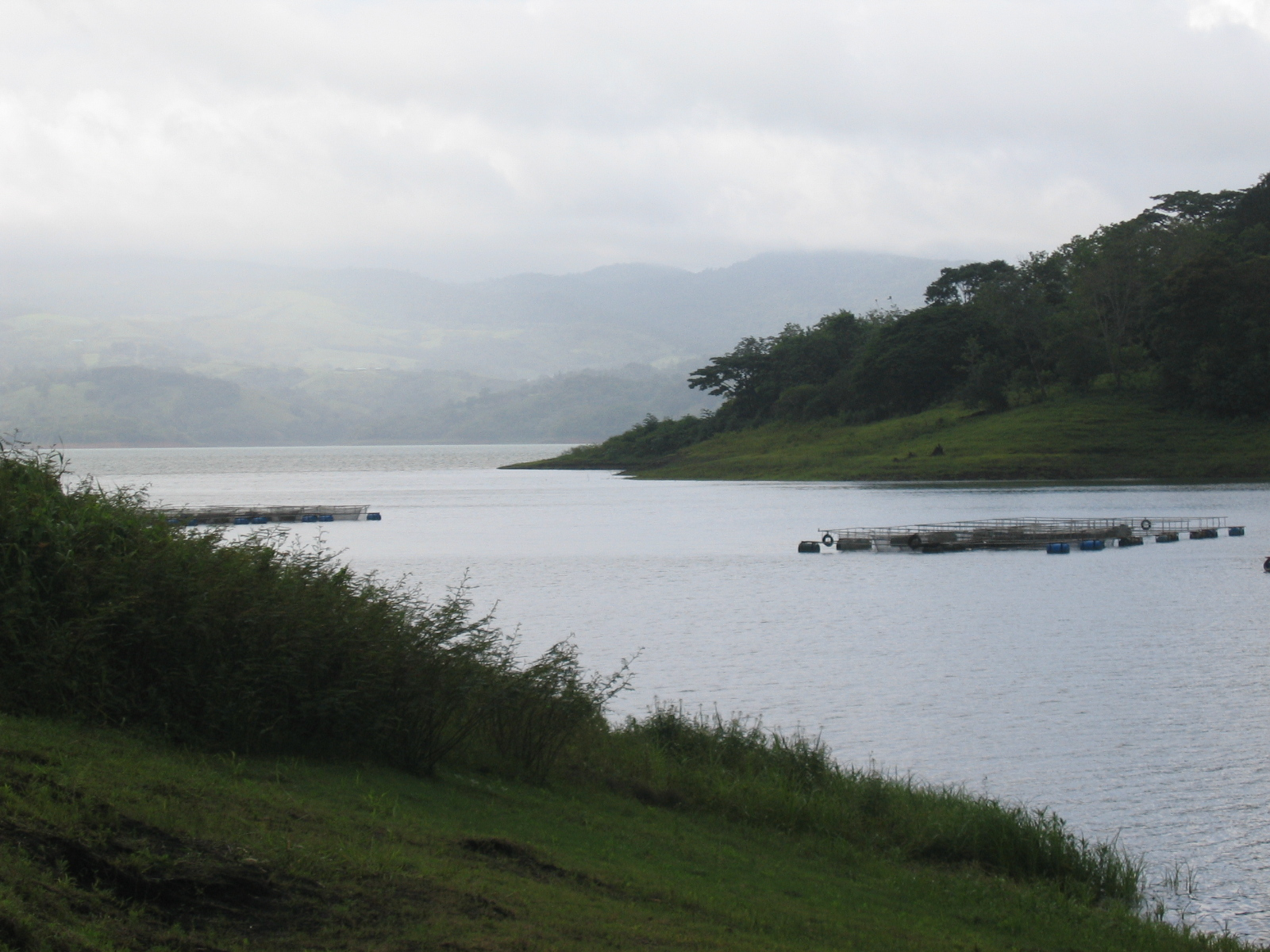
A view from the southwest side of Lake Arenal looking across at the north

In the most recent figures published by FAO, Costa Rica theoretically has the potential to generate 25,400 MW, however more practically, their potential is closer to 10,000 MW. The Lake Arenal Hydroelectric Power Plant has approximately 1,570 BCM of useful capacity and produces roughly 70% of Costa Rica's electricity. The hydroelectric dam on this lake is known as Presa Sangregado Dam, Arenal Dam, or the Sangregado Dam. This dam generates 640 GWh/yr and is located on the south-east shore of Lake Arenal in the Guanacaste Province, northwest Costa Rica. The Arenal hydroelectric project is operated by Instituto Costarricense de Electricidad. Other important hydroelectric operations in Costa Rica include the Cachí (three 34 MW turbines), Angostura (three 70 MW turbines), and Corobici 730 GWh/yr is a component of the Arenal hydroelectric project.

== Legal and institutional framework ==
=== Legal framework ===
- Law 276 of 1942, General water law of both public and private domains.
- Law 1634 of 1953, General Drinking Water Law declaring planning and implementation of water projects for the population of Costa Rica.
- Law 2726 of 1961, Law establishing the Costa Rica Institute of Water and Sewerage (AyA). There have been thirteen reforms to this law between 1966 and 1995.
- 2006 'Doctrine of water concepts'. By Decree 32868. This is an economic instrument for the regulation of usage and administration of water for achieving better availability to water resources.
- 2006 'Doctrine of environmental waste in landfills'. By Decree 31176 is for the regulation of water resource use and the dumping of contaminated substances into bodies of water.
- Rule by Decree 32327 in 2006 governing the quality of water.

(Source for all above and a complete list of Costa Rica Water laws in Spanish for viewing and download: ARESEP (Autoridad Reguladora de los Servicios Públicos))

=== Institutional framework ===
Water administration and management is the responsibility of the Environmental Ministry in Costa Rica and although the administration is defined in practice it has not functioned as well. Due to the lack of clear laws and strong institutions, management and administration is carried out by sectors and also falls on the water users. The institutional framework has at times been characterized as fragmented and dispersed, with poorly defined roles and functions, and with overlapping responsibilities.

- SENARA (Servicio Nacional de Aguas Subterráneas, Riego y Avenamientos) is the National Irrigation and Drainage Service. SENARA was created by Law 6877 on 18 July 1983 and was given the authority and direct responsibility for developing infrastructure, administration, and operation of irrigation and storm water systems. Additionally, SENARA conducts research on the preservation of aquifers so that optimal and efficient water resource management practices are maintained.
- AyA (Instituto Costarricense de Acueductos y Alcantarillados) is the Costa Rica Institute of Aqueducts and Sewer. Manages and operates the potable water, sewerage, and sanitation systems in both rural and urban settings. Additionally, AyA works in the conservation of water basins and reducing water pollution.
- ARESEP (Autoridad Reguladora de los Servicios Públicos) is the Regulatory authority for public services in Costa Rica. Water and sewer tariffs are approved by ARESEP.
- MINAE (Ministerio de Ambiente y Energia) is the Ministry of Environment and Energy where duties include the promotion of management, conservation, and sustainable development of natural elements and resources including water throughout the country.
- Asociaciones Operadoras de Sistemas de Acueductos y Alcantarillado Sanitario (ASADAS) is the national association of water system and sewerage operators.
- Arenal-Tempisque Irrigation District (DRAT) (see description above in "Irrigation")
- The Irrigation and Drainage of Small Areas (PARD) (see description above in "Irrigation")

== External Assistance ==
In a recent project from 2004 to 2007, the World Bank and the Japan Bank for International Cooperation (JBIC) co-sponsored a Costa Rica Water sector modernization project aimed at improving water coverage, quality and sustainability. JBIC committed $160 million and also supported the Costa Rica government with "special assistance for project formation" which in practice was a comprehensive project preparation study.

The Inter-American Development Bank (IDB) has various projects currently approved or in the implementation phases. Examples include a national plan for water resources management that was completed in 2005 and a water and sanitation project that is still being implemented as of 2010. The water resources management project supported the Costa Rica Government in implementing national water policies aimed at improving integrated water resource management strategies, increasing revenue generated from water, and decreasing poverty. The water and sanitation project is creating an investment program for the municipal level of government.

== Water users fees ==
Excerpts below taken from: Water supply and sanitation in Costa Rica

Water and sewer tariffs in Costa Rica are approved by the regulatory agency ARESEP and instituted by AyA, the water and sewer agency for Costa Rica. Revenues from user fees do not cover operation and maintenance costs and the financial situation of the sector is weak. Furthermore, tariff levels do not allow for full cost recovery. In the case of AyA, there are cross-subsidies from San José to the other urban and rural areas of the country. The tariff is set based on short term cash flow needs rather than on real economic costs of service provision. AyA requests tariff increases when its financial situation is precarious and not a result of long-term investment planning. The regulator, ARESEP tends to approve a partial percentage of these requests.

Water rates and fees for maintenance of irrigation systems are set by the National Irrigation and Drainage Service (SENARA). The water is not paid for by volume but per unit of area irrigated as in the case of DRAT above. As a contractual agreement with the Inter-American Development Bank (IDB), Costa Rica initiated a tariff adjustment by net area irrigable. The tariff adjustments are designed to increase investment recovery, improve operation and maintenance, is an incentive for the efficient use of water resources strengthen and strengthen water administration.

== Ramsar wetland sites in Costa Rica ==
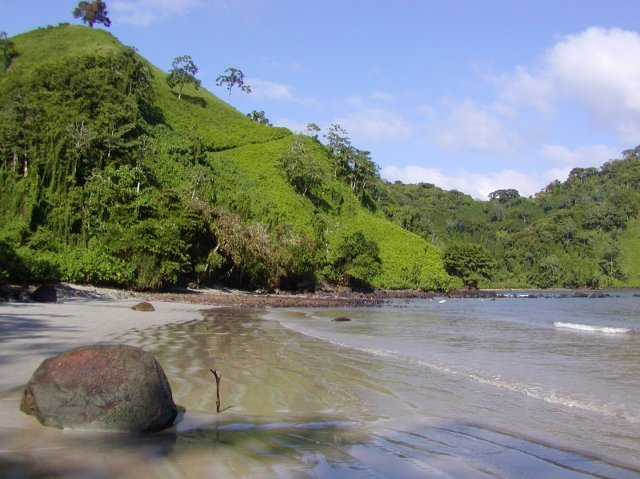
Chatham beach on Cocos Island.

In 2008 the Interdisciplinary Program of Research and Management of Water (PRIGA) of the National University of Costa Rica, in collaboration with the Program for the management of the River Basin Morote, organized a meeting with representatives of the National University and other national entities that are struggling with management of water resources. The goal was to discuss wetlands and their importance to water resources management, and participate in presentations on projects about research and management of wetlands and water resources in general.

=== Ramsar sites in Costa Rica ===
Costa Rica has the most Ramsar sites out of all the countries in Central America with twelve total sites.

- Caño Negro, 9,969 ha
- Cuenca Embalse Arenal, 67,295 ha
- Gandoca-Manzanillo, 9,445 ha
- Humedal Caribe Noreste, 75,310 ha
- Humedal Maquenque, 59,692 ha
- Isla del Coco, 99,623 ha
- Laguna Respringue, 75 ha
- Manglar de Potrero Grande, 139 ha
- Palo Verde, 24,519 ha
- Tamarindo, 500 ha
- Térraba-Sierpe, 30,654 ha
- Turberas de Talamanca (Distributed across Chirripó National Park, Tapantí National Park, Los Quetzales National Park, Los Santos Forest Reserve, Vueltas Hill Biological Reserve, Macho River Forest Reserve), 192,520 ha

(Source: Ramsar 2009)

== Potential climate change impacts ==
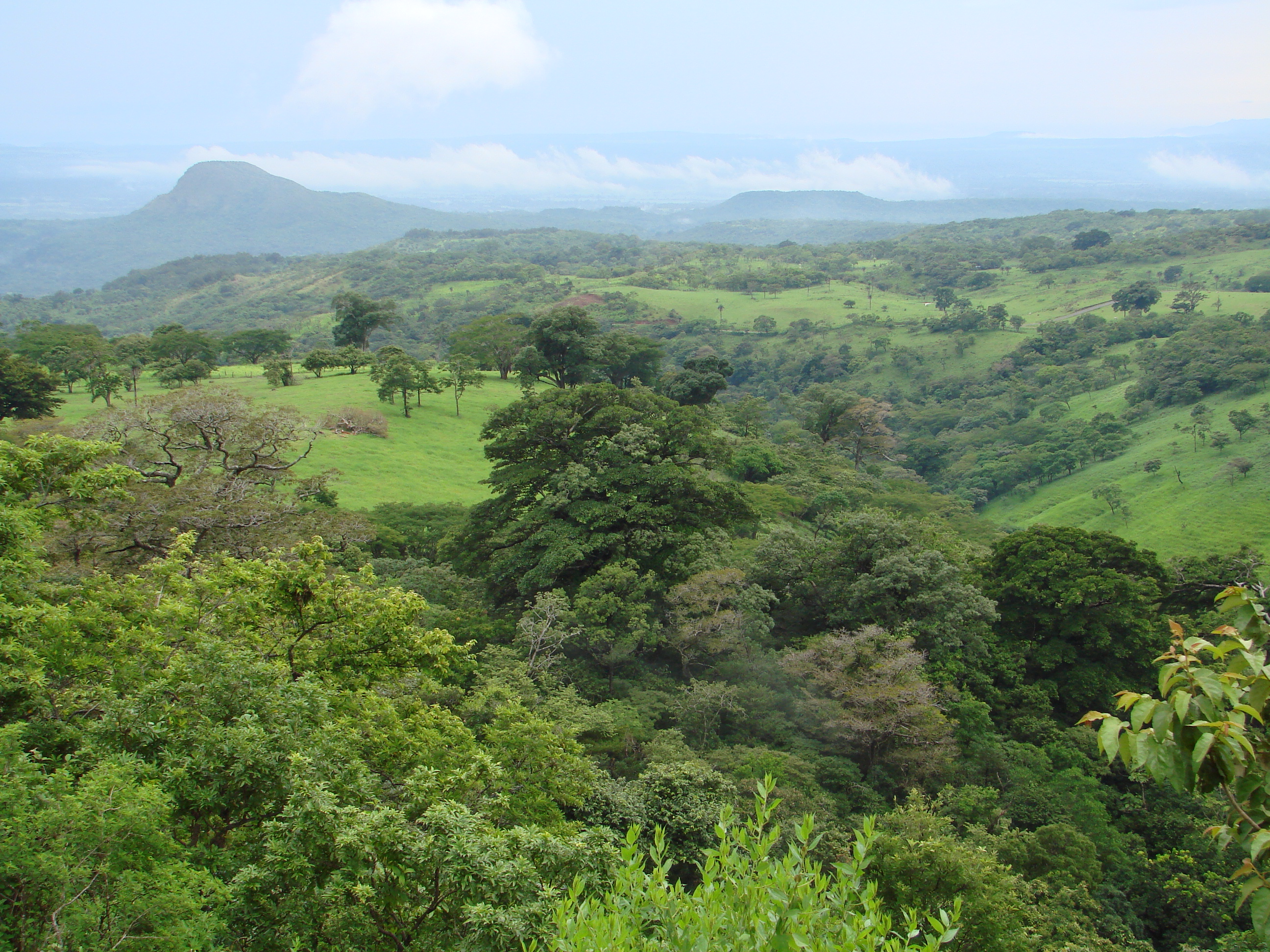
Costa Rica's tropical landscape

Work completed in 2008 by a team of researchers from the University of Massachusetts Amherst Climate System Research Center indicates that highland forests in Costa Rica could be seriously affected by any future changes in climate, reducing the number of species in a region famous for its biodiversity. Regional climate models predict that the area would become warmer and drier if climate change occurred. As the elevation increases from sea level to the mountains, differences in temperature and precipitation caused by elevation create an array of distinct ecosystems stacked on top of each other, each one housing a unique biological community. A doctoral candidate with the Amherst Climate System Research Center noted, "if carbon dioxide levels double, this region will not only experience an increase in temperature of more than five degrees F, but all future temperatures will likely be higher than the complete range of present-day temperatures. In addition, the model simulation indicates that high elevation Pacific slopes and the Caribbean lowlands will receive up to 30% less precipitation. Simulations also indicate an overall increase in the height of the cloud base of up to 300 meters.

== See also ==
- List of rivers of Costa Rica
