= Tricholosporum violaceum =

Scientific classification
- Kingdom: Fungi
- Division: Basidiomycota
- Class: Agaricomycetes
- Order: Agaricales
- Family: Tricholomataceae
- Genus: Tricholosporum
- Species: T. violaceum

Binomial name
- Tricholosporum violaceum Halling & Franco-Mol. (1996)

Species of fungus

Tricholosporum violaceum is a species of fungus in the family Tricholomataceae. Found in Costa Rica, the species was described as new to science in 1996.

== Taxonomy ==
The fungus was first described scientifically by mycologists Roy Halling and Ana Franco-Molano. The type collection was made in June, 1995, from Hacienda La Amistad in Coto Brus (Costa Rica), at an elevation of 1,300 m (4,300 ft). Based on morphology, Tricholosporum violaceum is most similar to T. pseudosordidum and T. tropicalis.

== Description ==
Fruit bodies have caps that are initially convex before flattening out, sometimes developing a slight umbo, and typically attain a diameter of 8–13 cm (3.1–5.1 in). The cap surface is moist, smooth or somewhat covered in tiny scales, and violet in color. The flesh is white to yellowish white, with a mild taste and odor ranging from sour to radish-like to spermatic. Gill attachment ranges from adnexed to emarginate to free. They are closely spaced, white with a lilac tint, and have even to irregular edges. The stipe measures 5–11 cm (2.0–4.3 in) by 1.5–2 cm (0.6–0.8 in) thick, and is either equal in width throughout, or tapers towards the base. The upper half of the stipe is violet, while the lower half is white. The spore print is white. Spores are smooth, rhomboid shaped, inamyloid, and measure 3.6–5 μm long by 2.8–4.3 μm wide. Clamp connections are present in the hyphae. The basidia are narrowly club-shaped, four-spored, and measure 21–30 by 5–6 μm. Both pleurocystidia and cheilocystidia are present in the hymenium; they are similar in morphology, with dimensions of 31–60 by 7–9 μm.

== Habitat and distribution ==
Fruit bodies of Tricholosporum violaceum grow on the ground, and may associate with oaks, although its mycorrhizal status is unknown. The fungus is found in Costa Rica, where it has been recorded from Las Tablas Protected Zone and near the Monteverde Cloud Forest Preserve.
