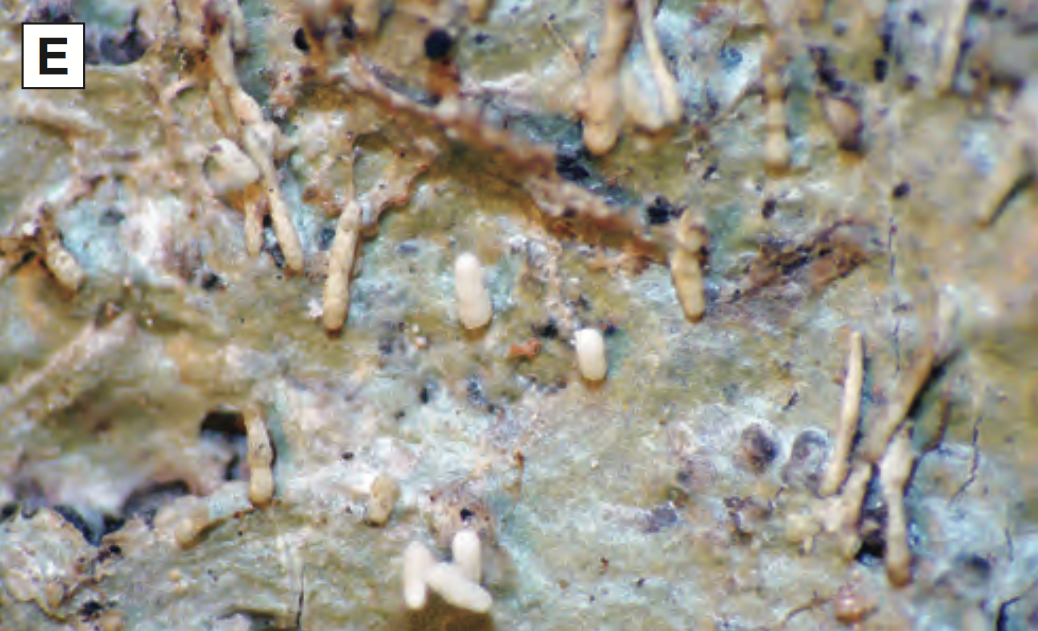

Scientific classification
- Domain: Eukaryota
- Kingdom: Fungi
- Division: Ascomycota
- Class: Lecanoromycetes
- Order: Graphidales
- Family: Graphidaceae
- Genus: Acanthotrema
- Species: A. alboisidiatum

Binomial name
- Acanthotrema alboisidiatum Mercado-Díaz, Lücking & Parnmen (2014)

= Acanthotrema alboisidiatum =

Species of lichen

Acanthotrema alboisidiatum is a species of corticolous (bark-dwelling) crustose lichen in the family Graphidaceae. Described as a new species in 2014, it is primarily distinguished by its striking white isidia that contrast with its light olive-green thallus. The lichen was recognized as a new species despite the absence of ascomata and ascospores, usually crucial for taxonomic identification. Its DNA sequence data confirms its place in the Acanthotrema genus but distinguishes it from other known members of this genus. The species grows up to a diameter of 5 cm (2 in) and bears short, white isidiate outgrowths that resemble insect eggs. The lichen appears to favour the shaded understory of Tabonuco forests in El Yunque National Forest, Puerto Rico, particularly towards the base of Dacryodes excelsa trees.

== Taxonomy ==
This species was first formally described in 2014 by lichenologists Joel Mercado-Díaz, Robert Lücking, and Sittiporn Parnmen. The holotype, the original specimen from which the description is derived, was discovered in Río Grande, Puerto Rico, on the trunk of a Dacryodes excelsa tree. The species name alboisidiatum refers to the lichen's striking white isidia, a distinguishing feature of this species, which contrasts with the olive-green thallus.

Even in the absence of ascomata and ascospores, Acanthotrema alboisidiatum was formally recognised as a new species. Its unique, white isidia, especially noticeable in their early stages of growth, are a standout feature that defines this taxon. Mitochondrial small subunit rDNA sequence data indicate that the available collections of this lichen belong to the genus Acanthotrema (family Graphidaceae) but represent a species distinct from the other known members of this genus, including A. brasilianum, A. frischii, and A. kalbii.

== Description ==
Acanthotrema alboisidiatum can extend to a diameter of up to 5 cm (2 in). The thallus, or body, of the lichen is light olive-green, smooth to uneven and shiny. What stands out are the white isidia, short outgrowths on the lichen's surface that, especially when not fully matured, bear a resemblance to insect eggs. These isidia range from 0.2 to 1.0 mm long and 0.1–0.15 mm wide.

Despite careful examination, ascomata, the reproductive structures where spores are produced, were not observed in this species. The lichen's photobiont, the component responsible for photosynthesis, is a form of green alga known as Trentepohlia. The cells of Trentepohlia are irregular and grouped together, with a yellowish-green hue.

No chemical substances were detected by thin-layer chromatography during the analysis of this species.

== Habitat and distribution ==
Acanthotrema alboisidiatum was discovered in the shaded understory of Tabonuco forests in El Yunque National Forest, Puerto Rico. It was particularly found towards the base of Dacryodes excelsa trees, suggesting a preference for this type of environment. An additional specimen was examined from Luquillo, Puerto Rico. Tabonuco forests in Puerto Rico have a diverse lichen biota, with 76 corticolous species having been identified from this habitat.
