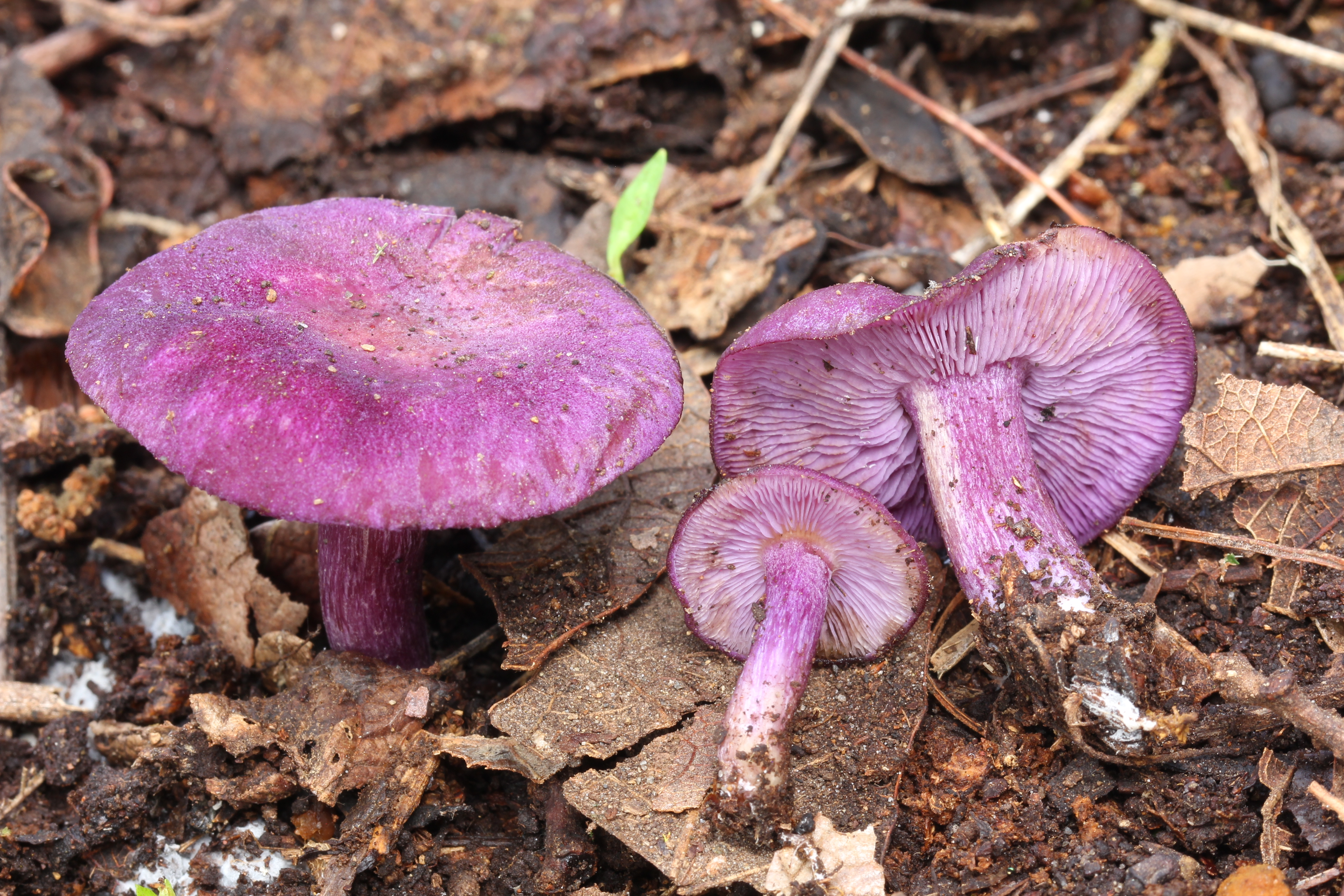
- Tricholosporum tropicale

Scientific classification
- Kingdom: Fungi
- Division: Basidiomycota
- Class: Agaricomycetes
- Order: Agaricales
- Family: Tricholomataceae
- Genus: Tricholosporum
- Species: T. tropicale

Binomial name
- Tricholosporum tropicale Guzmán, Bandala & Montoya (1994)

= Tricholosporum tropicale =

Species of fungus

Tricholosporum tropicale is a species of fungus in the family Tricholomataceae. It is found in Mexico.

== Taxonomy ==
The species was described as new to science in 1994 by mycologist Gastón Guzmán and colleagues. It was originally named Tricholosporum tropicalis.

== Description ==
The cap is convex to flattened to slightly concave, measuring up to 6 cm (2.4 in) in diameter. The color is bluish violet to greyish violet, drying to brownish. It is dry and smooth, although dry specimens may show radial grooves at the margin corresponding to the gills on the underside. The closely spaced gills have an adnate attachment to the stipe, and are pinkish brown to violet brown. The stipe measures about 3.5 cm (1.4 in) long by 0.8 cm (0.3 in) thick, and is somewhat bulbous at the base. It has a smooth surface that is whitish to light gray when fresh, drying to the same color as the cap. The flesh is whitish with a pleasant odor and taste.

Spores are cross-shaped, thin-walled, hyaline (translucent), and typically measure 4.8–5.6 by 3.2–4 μm. They have a negative staining reaction with Melzer's reagent, and feature a conspicuous hilar appendage. The basidia (spore-bearing cells) are club-shaped with clamps at the base, and measure 24–32 long by 4.8–5.6 μm wide. Clamp connections are common in the hyphae. The hymenium contains an abundance of cystidia on both the gill edges (cheilocystidia) and faces (pleurocystidia).

=== Similar species ===
The subtropical fungi Tricholosporum atroviolaceum and T. pseudosordidum are similar species with small spores. They can be distinguished from T. tropicale by their less robust fruit bodies, and microscopically by the relative dearth of cystidia.

== Habitat and distribution ==
The type collection of Tricholosporum tropicale was discovered in September, fruiting singly on the ground in a cacao plantation. The location was a tropical rainforest in the State of Chiapas, Mexico.
