= Water supply and sanitation in Costa Rica =

Data
- Access to an improved water source: 97% (2010)
- Access to improved sanitation: 95% (2010)
- Share of collected wastewater treated: 4% (2007)
- Average urban water and sanitation tariff (US$/m^{3}): 5/month
- Share of household metering: 96%
- Annual investment in WSS: 5/capita (1991-1998 average)
- Share of self-financing by utilities: 40%
- Share of tax-financing: 30%
- Share of external financing: 30%

Institutions
- Decentralization to municipalities: Very limited
- National water and sanitation company: AyA
- Water and sanitation regulator: ARESEP
- Responsibility for policy setting: Ministry of Health and Ministry of Environment
- Sector law: None
- No. of urban service providers: 2
- No. of rural service providers: 1,827

Costa Rica has made significant progress in the past decade in expanding access to water supply and sanitation, but the sector faces key challenges in low sanitation connections, poor service quality, and low cost recovery.

== Access ==
In 2015, in Costa Rica, 98% of the population had access to "improved" water, 99.5% and 92%, in urban and rural areas, respectively. In 2015, there were still around 111 thousand people lacking access to "improved" water. Regarding sanitation, in 2015, around 274 thousand people did not have access to "improved" sanitation. In the same year, 95% of the population had access to "improved" sanitation, 95% and 92%, in urban and rural areas, respectively.

Costa Rica has made meaningful progress in expansion of water services in urban areas over the past decades. Approximately 99% of the urban population is connected to water supply (as compared to an average of 90% in the LAC region), a significant increase from 92% in 1990. Around 48% had urban sanitation connections to public sewerage or had individual septic tanks.

Rural coverage is lower, with about 95% of the 1.7 million rural inhabitants connected to public water supply, although not all of the water provided is safe. 96% of the population has access to improved sanitation, mostly through the use of septic tanks. Because of its achievements in increasing access to water supply and sanitation, the UN Special Rapporteur for the human right of water and sanitation has said after a visit in 2009, "Costa Rica (is placed) among the most advanced countries in the Latin American and Caribbean region."

== Service quality ==
The countrywide increase in coverage rates in water and sanitation masks shortcomings in the quality of service.

=== Drinking water quality ===
In 2007, 18% of the population did not receive water of potable quality through 1,032 water systems in rural areas and small towns, operated by municipalities and community-based organizations, called ASADAS by their Spanish acronym, that consist of volunteers without specialized training. The quality of drinking water of some communities is affected by pesticides used on pineapple plantations. For example, about 6,000 people in Siquirres are unable to drink local tap water and have to be supplied by tanker trucks since 2007.

A survey of rural residents in the watersheds of the Baru and Guabo Rivers conducted in 2005 showed that illnesses from poor-quality piped water were common and that the community-based organizations in charge of operating the systems lacked adequate support as well as appropriate expertise. Furthermore, the vast majority of indigenous peoples living in the 24 reserves in the country do not have access to safe drinking water or sanitation services.

=== Continuity of supply ===
In most of the regions of the country, water production capacity is close to current demand, so the risk of facing water deficits future is high and, in fact, various cities already suffer from water shortages and rationing. For example, a water crisis was generated by tourist and real estate developments in the area of the popular Manuel Antonio National Park: Since the existing water supply systems could not cope with the substantial increase in demand, for more than a year hotels and real estate developments had to receive water from AyA water tankers.

=== Wastewater treatment ===
As of 2015 21% of all households were connected to a sewer system. However, only 15% of the collected sewerage is being treated, so that most of the wastewater collected is discharged into rivers and the sea without any treatment, generating public health risks and water resources contamination. As of 2007, some wastewater treatment plants were out of operation. At the time only 7 small towns had wastewater treatment plants, all of which had been built before 1975. As of 2011, bidding was underway for a large wastewater treatment plant for the metropolitan area of San José with Japanese financing.

=== Septage management ===
The existing on-site sanitation installations, such as septic tanks, are not always an adequate solution. Some of them contaminate aquifers which are used as water supply sources. Furthermore, the sludge (septage) removed while cleaning septic tanks is usually disposed of in rivers and constitutes a source of pollution.

== Responsibility for water supply and sanitation ==
The responsibility for water and sanitation is spread over a wide number of institutions and is regulated by numerous laws and regulations, some of which are outdated. According to a 2009 report by the UN Special Rapporteur on the human right to water and sanitation after a visit to Costa Rica, there is a "duplication of responsibilities, lack of inter-agency coordination and, at times, conflicting competencies in the planning and development of water and sanitation policies." Furthermore, "several institutions with competencies to monitor compliance with the existing normative framework do not have sufficient human, technical and financial resources to carry out their monitoring functions effectively".

=== Policy and regulation ===
Responsibility for water and sanitation policy is shared by the Ministry of Health (MINSALUD) and the Ministry of Environment, Energy and Telecommunications (MINAET). Other Ministries also have a role in the sector, sometimes with overlapping functions and responsibilities.

The economic regulation of the major service providers - AyA and ASADAS - is the responsibility of the Regulatory Authority for Public Services (ARESEP) created in 1999, which is responsible for tariff setting, setting technical regulations, and monitoring the compliance with these regulations.

AyA de facto has an important indirect policy and regulatory role since it monitors the compliance with technical norms, can take over failing systems and advises the Ministry in the development of the sector. This double role implies a conflict of interest. AyA's management is politically nominated and frequently replaced on the basis of political cycles.

=== Service provision ===
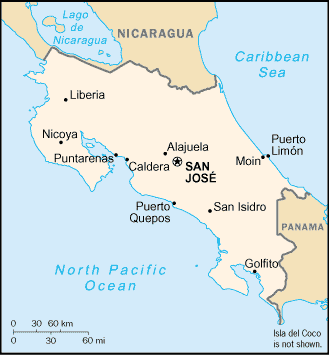
Map of Costa Rica

According to the Drinking Water Law of 1953 the country's 81 municipalities (called cantons) are responsible for the provision of water and sanitation services. In reality municipalities operate only 240 mostly small water systems reaching only 17% of the population, while most of the population is provided by the following entities:

- The Costa Rican Water and Sanitation Institute (AyA), which is a centralized public institution reporting to the Minister of Health. AyA is in charge of directly administering and operating 180 water systems serving 46% of the population, mostly in urban areas. AyA directly serves 3% of the rural population;
- Administrative Committees of Rural Water Systems (CAARs) and Administrative Associations of Rural Water and Sanitation Systems (ASADAS), which serve a total of 26% of the country's population through in 1,827 water systems in rural communities.
- The Heredia Public Services Company (ESPH S.A.), which is an autonomous multi-services public utility constituted under private law that provides water, sewer and electricity services to Heredia 10 km north of the capital. It serves almost 5% of the country's population;
- other private organizations that operate water systems, such as housing developers, serving about 5% of the population.

In addition to its role of service provider, AyA is responsible for providing support to water and sanitation associations in rural communities outside of AyA's service area and monitoring their compliance with technical norms. AyA can assume the operation of failing systems in order to guarantee the continuity of provision of services. The Rural Works Department within AyA is responsible for the planning, design, financing and construction of rural water supply and sanitation systems and the provision of technical assistance to the ASADAS.

== Economic efficiency (water losses) ==
Non-revenue water ("water losses") in Costa Rican water companies is high, as most systems are operating with losses usually over 50%, a value which reflects a high level of inefficiency and compromises continuity of service.

== Financial aspects ==
=== Tariffs and cost recovery ===
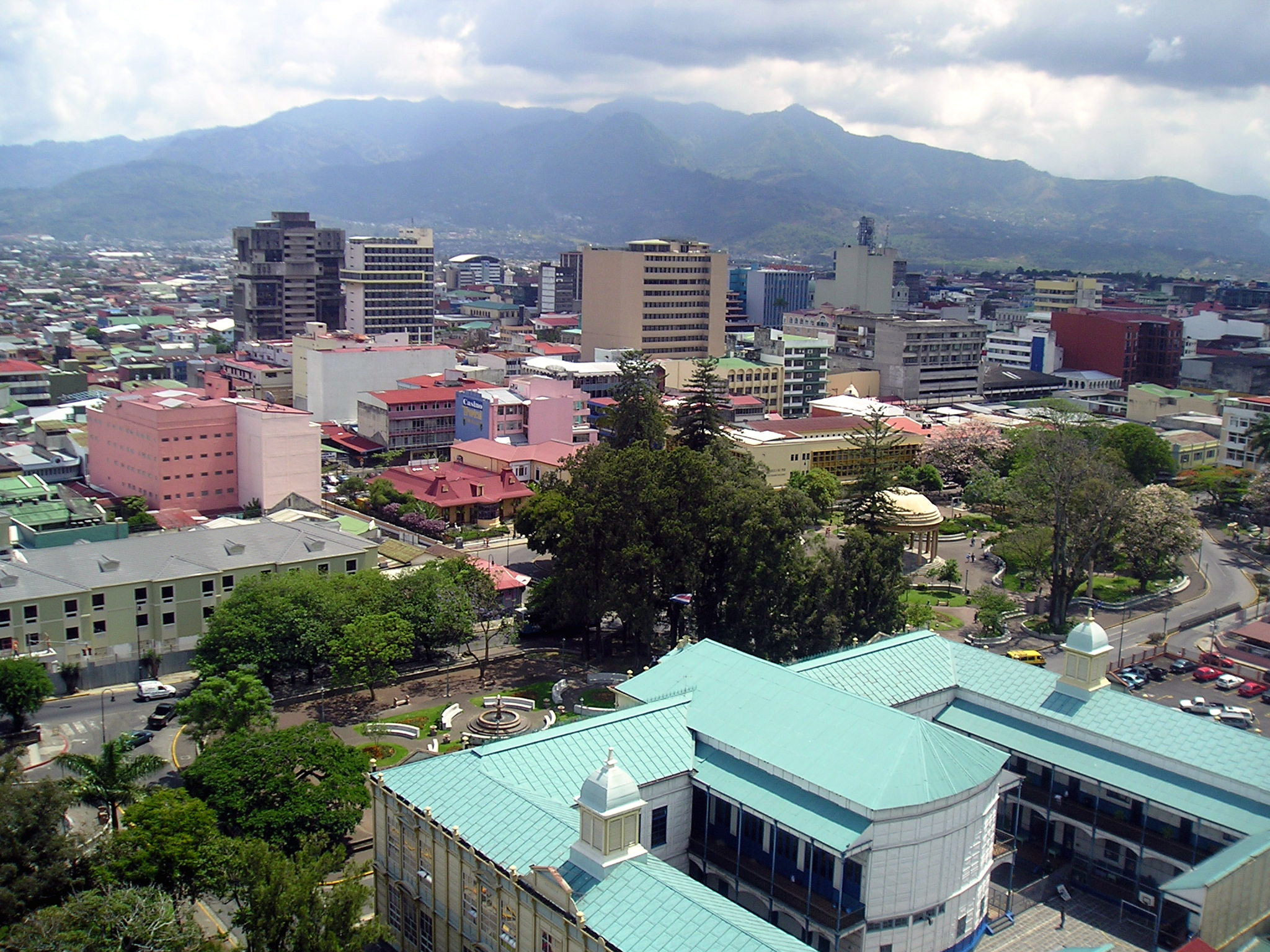
San José, Capital of Costa Rica

Water and sewer tariffs in Costa Rica are approved by the regulatory agency ARESEP. Revenues in the Costa Rican water and sanitation sector do not cover operation and maintenance costs, and the financial situation of the sector is precarious.

Tariff levels do not allow for full cost recovery. In the case of AyA, there are cross-subsidies from the metropolitan area of San José to the other urban and rural areas of the country. The tariff is set based on short term cash flow needs rather than on real economic costs of service provision. AyA requests tariff increases when its financial situation is precarious and not a result of long-term investment planning. The regulator tends to approve these requests only partially.

AyA has not been compensated by the government for assuming its role played as the main subsidy provider to the rural sector. This situation puts a high financial burden on AyA and is one of the reasons for AyA's financial problems. Since the government does not directly subsidize the rural sector it is not aware of the magnitude of the problem and of its financial impact on AyA.

In rural areas tariffs do not allow for cost recovery either. Rural tariffs vary and stood at an average equivalent to US$0.18 per cubic meter in 2001, compared to US$0.25-0.28 per cubic meter charged by AyA.

=== Investment and financing ===
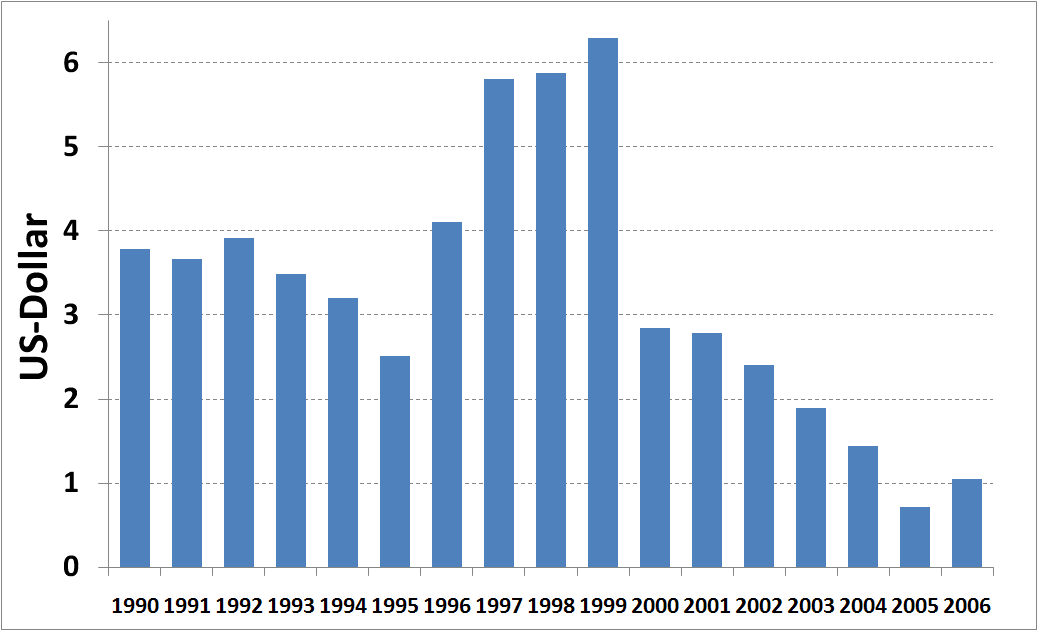
Costa Rican investment per capita in water supply and sanitation from 1990 to 2006 in constant US Dollars of 2006

Great efforts and large investment to the Costa Rican water and sanitation sector are required to improve water and sanitation services. In the past, over 60% of the sector investments came from government resources, half of which was financed by multilateral loans. However, given the current investment needs of the sector, the government can no longer maintain such a high share of sector financing. Consequently, there is a need for increasing internal cash generation by service providers and for the mobilization of commercial financing.

According to the Controlaría General de la República, US$203 million were invested in water supply and sanitation from 1990 to 2006, which is on average US$3.3 per capita and year. The investment reached its peak in 1999, when it was US$6.3 per capita. Since 2000, it fell back substantially until reaching only US$0.7 in 2005 and US$1.1 in 2006. Compared to other Latin American countries, this investment level is very low.

Most of the investments in rural areas are being financed through grants channeled through AyA.

In 2002 AyA proposed a sector modernization program (2001–2020), which envisages maintaining urban water coverage at 98.5% and drastically increasing coverage of urban sewerage to 89% by 2020. It also envisages an increase in rural water coverage to 90% by 2020. The total investment required for implementing this program amounts to US$1.6 Billion or approximately US$80 million per year, and reflects the many years of neglect in the maintenance of AyA's assets. This corresponds to four times the average annual investment during 1991–1998. AyA estimated in 2002 that, taking into account increased cash generation and efficiency improvements, only about 40% of the investment would still have to be financed by the government.

== External support ==
The major donors involved in the water and sanitation sector are Japanese JICA, German KfW, and CABEI, the Central American Bank for Economic Integration.

=== Central American Bank for Economic Integration ===
AyA is aiming to increase rural coverage to 98% in the next three or four years with the agreement between the Banco Popular and the Central American Bank for Economic Integration (CABEI) signed in March 2007. The main goals of the agreement are to promote ASADAS sustainability and to help it achieve 100% coverage, as well as to register ASADAS into an automated information system to improve operations records and tariff collections.

=== Inter-American Development Bank ===
The IDB assisted the government in designing a water and sanitation subnational program.

=== Japanese Bank for International Cooperation ===
In 2006 the Japanese Bank for International Development (JBIC) and the government of Costa Rica signed the Metropolitan San José Environment Improvement Project loan to develop a wastewater treatment plant, installation of sewerage, and consulting services.

== Relevant laws ==
Relevant laws include the following:

- Law No. 276 of 1942, the law governing water resources (Water Law),
- Law No. 1634 of 1953, the General Drinking Water Law,
- Law No. 2726 of 1961, the Law creating AyA.
- Law No. 5395 of 1973, The General Health Law, in particular articles 264–277.

== See also ==
- Water resources management in Costa Rica
