= Pacific La Amistad Conservation Area =

Conservation area in Costa Rica

- Área de Conservación La Amistad Pacífico
- Location of the area, labeled ACLAP in the southeast of the country.
- Location: Puntarenas Province, Costa Rica
- Coordinates: 9.0°N 83.2°W
- Governing body: National System of Conservation Areas (SINAC)
- Website: Pacific La Amistad Conservation Area

Pacific La Amistad Conservation Area (ACLA-P; Spanish: Área de Conservación La Amistad Pacífico) is an administrative area which is managed by SINAC for the purposes of conservation in the southern part of Costa Rica, on the Pacific side of the Continental Divide. It contains several National Parks, and a number Wildlife refuges and other types of nature reserve.

== Protected areas ==
- La Amistad International Park (shared with Panama and Caribbean La Amistad Conservation Area)
- Chirripó National Park
- Las Tablas Protected Zone
- Los Santos Forest Reserve (shared with Central Conservation Area)
- Paraguas Lake Lacustrine Wetland
- San Vito Wetland
