= Tricholosporum tetragonosporum =

Scientific classification
- Kingdom: Fungi
- Division: Basidiomycota
- Class: Agaricomycetes
- Order: Agaricales
- Family: Tricholomataceae
- Genus: Tricholosporum
- Species: T. tetragonosporum

Binomial name
- Tricholosporum tetragonosporum (Maire) Contu & Mua

Synonyms
- 1945 Tricholoma tetragonosporum Maire; 1989 Tricholoma goniospermum f. tetragonosporum (Maire) Bon

Species of fungus

Tricholosporum tetragonosporum is a species of fungus in the family Tricholomataceae. Found in Morocco, the species was first described as Tricholoma tetragonosporum by René Maire in 1945, and transferred into Tricholosporum in 2000.
