= San Vito Wetland =

Protected area in Costa Rica

- Humedal San Vito
- Location within Costa Rica
- Location: Costa Rica
- Coordinates: 8.828°N 82.954°W
- Area: 0.44 square kilometres (0.17 sq mi)
- Established: 22 February 1994
- Governing body: National System of Conservation Areas (SINAC)

San Vito Wetland (Spanish: Humedal San Vito), is a protected area in Costa Rica, managed under the Pacific La Amistad Conservation Area, it was created in 1994 by decree 22879.
