= Tricholosporum subgoniospermum =

Scientific classification
- Kingdom: Fungi
- Division: Basidiomycota
- Class: Agaricomycetes
- Order: Agaricales
- Family: Tricholomataceae
- Genus: Tricholosporum
- Species: T. subgoniospermum

Binomial name
- Tricholosporum subgoniospermum Bohus, Vasas & Locsmándi

Species of fungus

Tricholosporum subgoniospermum is a species of fungus in the family Tricholomataceae. Known from Hungary, the species was described as new to science in 1999.
