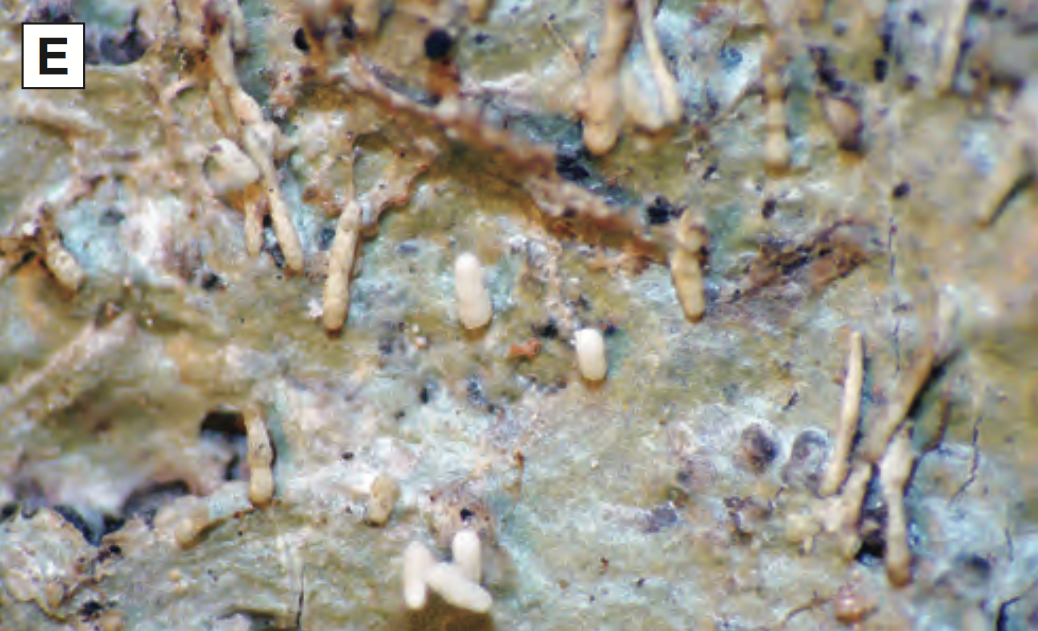
- Closeup of the white isidia characteristic of Acanthotrema alboisidiatum

Scientific classification
- Domain: Eukaryota
- Kingdom: Fungi
- Division: Ascomycota
- Class: Lecanoromycetes
- Order: Graphidales
- Family: Graphidaceae
- Genus: Acanthotrema; Frisch (2006)

Type species
- Acanthotrema brasilianum (Hale) Frisch (2006)

= Acanthotrema =

Genus of lichen

Acanthotrema is a genus of lichens in the family Graphidaceae. The genus was circumscribed by German lichenologist Andreas Frisch in 2006, with Acanthotrema brasilianum assigned as the type species. Acanthotrema species are commonly found in rainforests ranging from lowland to montane environments.

== Description ==
Acanthotrema has a grey-olive thallus with a dense, prosoplectenchymatous cortex that can occasionally split. The apothecia are erumpent, taking on angular-rounded to lobate (chroodiscoid) forms, with a visible disc and a margin that is lobulate and merged. Acanthotrema lacks a columella, and its excipulum has a paraplectenchymatous, uncarbonized structure. Spinulose-tipped periphysoids are present, as are unbranched paraphyses with spinulose tips.

The ascospores of Acanthotrema range from septate to muriform and come in shapes ranging from fusiform to ellipsoid, with thin septa and rectangular lumina. They are non-amyloid. This lichen genus does not contain any secondary chemical compounds.

Characteristics that differentiate Acanthotrema apart from other genera that possess similar fruiting structures are its chroodiscoid apothecia, spinulose periphysoids, and paraphyses. Ascospores in Acanthotrema have notably thin walls, a characteristic shared only with the genus Chroodiscus. However, Chroodiscus does not have periphysoids, possesses paraphyses with smooth apices, and is strictly foliicolous (leaf dwelling). While certain Chapsa species, such as C. astroidea, may bear a resemblance to Acanthotrema due to the similarity in apothecia and the near-thin-walled, non-amyloid ascospores, these taxa consistently have paraphyses with smooth apices.

== Species ==
Species Fungorum accepts six species of Acanthotrema:

- Acanthotrema alboisidiatum Merc.-Díaz, Lücking & Parnmen (2014)
- Acanthotrema bicellulare Sipman & Lücking (2012)
- Acanthotrema brasilianum (Hale) Frisch (2006)
- Acanthotrema frischii Lücking (2010)
- Acanthotrema kalbii Lücking (2012)
- Acanthotrema minus Aptroot (2020) – Brazil
