= Tricholosporum goniospermum =

Scientific classification
- Kingdom: Fungi
- Division: Basidiomycota
- Class: Agaricomycetes
- Order: Agaricales
- Family: Tricholomataceae
- Genus: Tricholosporum
- Species: T. goniospermum

Binomial name
- Tricholosporum goniospermum (Bres.) Guzmán ex T.J.Baroni

Synonyms
- 1881 Tricholoma goniospermum Bres. 1961 Tricholoma personatum var. goniospermum (Bres.) Rick; 1975 Tricholosporum goniospermum (Bres.) Guzmán

Species of fungus

Tricholosporum goniospermum is a species of fungus in the family Tricholomataceae, and the type species of the genus Tricholosporum. First described scientifically by Giacomo Bresadola in 1881 as Tricholoma goniospermum, it was transferred to the genus Tricholosporum, established in 1975 by Mexican mycologist Gaston Guzman. As was pointed out in a 1982 publication by Tim Baroni, the transfer was not valid, "because complete reference to the authors and the original publications of the basionyms was not provided". Baroni made the new combination official in his publication.
