= Tricholosporum laeteviolaceum =

Scientific classification
- Kingdom: Fungi
- Division: Basidiomycota
- Class: Agaricomycetes
- Order: Agaricales
- Family: Tricholomataceae
- Genus: Tricholosporum
- Species: T. laeteviolaceum

Binomial name
- Tricholosporum laeteviolaceum D.A.Reid, Eicker, Clémençon & Cec.Roux

Species of fungus

Tricholosporum laeteviolaceum is a species of fungus in the family Tricholomataceae. Found in South Africa, it was first described as new to science in 1998.
