= Lepanthes machogaffensis =

Scientific classification
- Kingdom: Plantae
- Clade: Tracheophytes
- Clade: Angiosperms
- Clade: Monocots
- Order: Asparagales
- Family: Orchidaceae
- Subfamily: Epidendroideae
- Genus: Lepanthes
- Species: L. machogaffensis

Binomial name
- Lepanthes machogaffensis Pupulin & Jiménez, 2009

Species of orchid

Lepanthes machogaffensis is a species of Neotropical orchid described in 2009. It is endemic to Costa Rica and has so far only been found in Tapantí National Park. It has red petals and may flower several times during the year, yet its flowers only last for three days. It is named after the MachoGaff virgin forest within the park where it was found.
