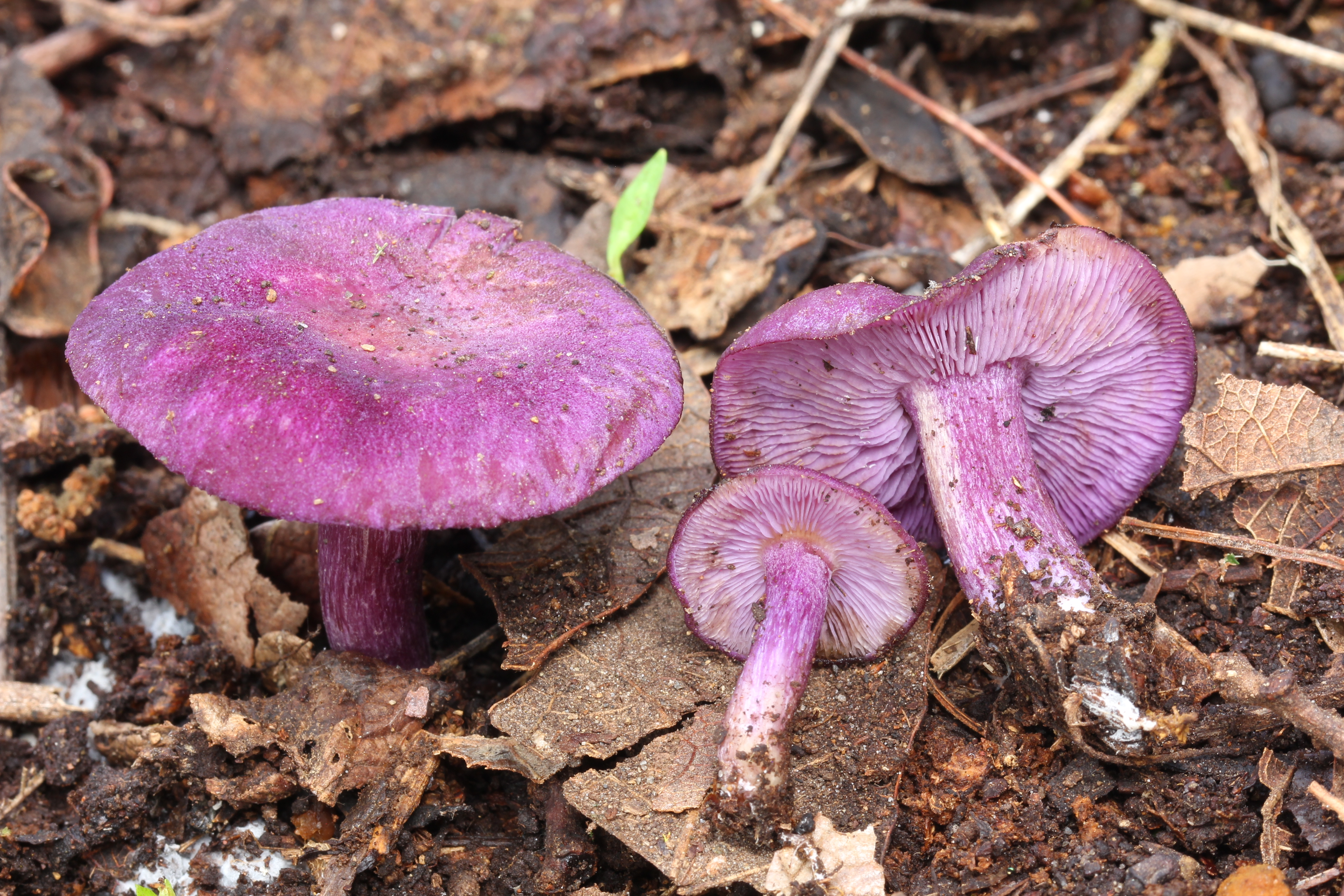
- Tricholosporum tropicale

Scientific classification
- Kingdom: Fungi
- Division: Basidiomycota
- Class: Agaricomycetes
- Order: Agaricales
- Family: Tricholomataceae
- Genus: Tricholosporum; Guzmán (1975)

Type species
- Tricholosporum goniospermum (Bres.) Guzmán ex T.J.Baroni (1982)

Species
- T. atroviolaceum T. cossonianum T. goniospermum T. laeteviolaceum T. longicystidiosum T. porphyrophyllum T. pseudosordidum T. subgoniospermum T. subporphyrophyllum T. tetragonosporum T. tropicale T. violaceum

= Tricholosporum =

Genus of fungi

Tricholosporum is a genus of fungi in the family Tricholomataceae. It was circumscribed by Mexican mycologist Gastón Guzmán in 1975.

== See also ==
- List of Tricholomataceae genera
