= Tricholosporum cossonianum =

Scientific classification
- Kingdom: Fungi
- Division: Basidiomycota
- Class: Agaricomycetes
- Order: Agaricales
- Family: Tricholomataceae
- Genus: Tricholosporum
- Species: T. cossonianum

Binomial name
- Tricholosporum cossonianum (Maire) P.-A. Moreau & Contu

Synonyms
- 1926 Tricholoma cossonianum Maire; 1953 Lyophyllum cossonianum (Maire) Kühner & Romagn.

Species of fungus

Tricholosporum cossonianum is a species of fungus in the family Tricholomataceae.

== Taxonomy ==
The species was first described as Tricholoma cossonianum by René Maire. Robert Kühner and Henri Romagnesi transferred it to Lyophyllum in 1953, and it was again transferred into Tricholosporum in 2007.
