= Tricholosporum longicystidiosum =

Scientific classification
- Kingdom: Fungi
- Division: Basidiomycota
- Class: Agaricomycetes
- Order: Agaricales
- Family: Tricholomataceae
- Genus: Tricholosporum
- Species: T. longicystidiosum

Binomial name
- Tricholosporum longicystidiosum Guzmán, Montoya & Bandala

Species of fungus

Tricholosporum longicystidiosum is a species of fungus in the family Tricholomataceae. Found in Mexico, it was described as new to science in 1990.
