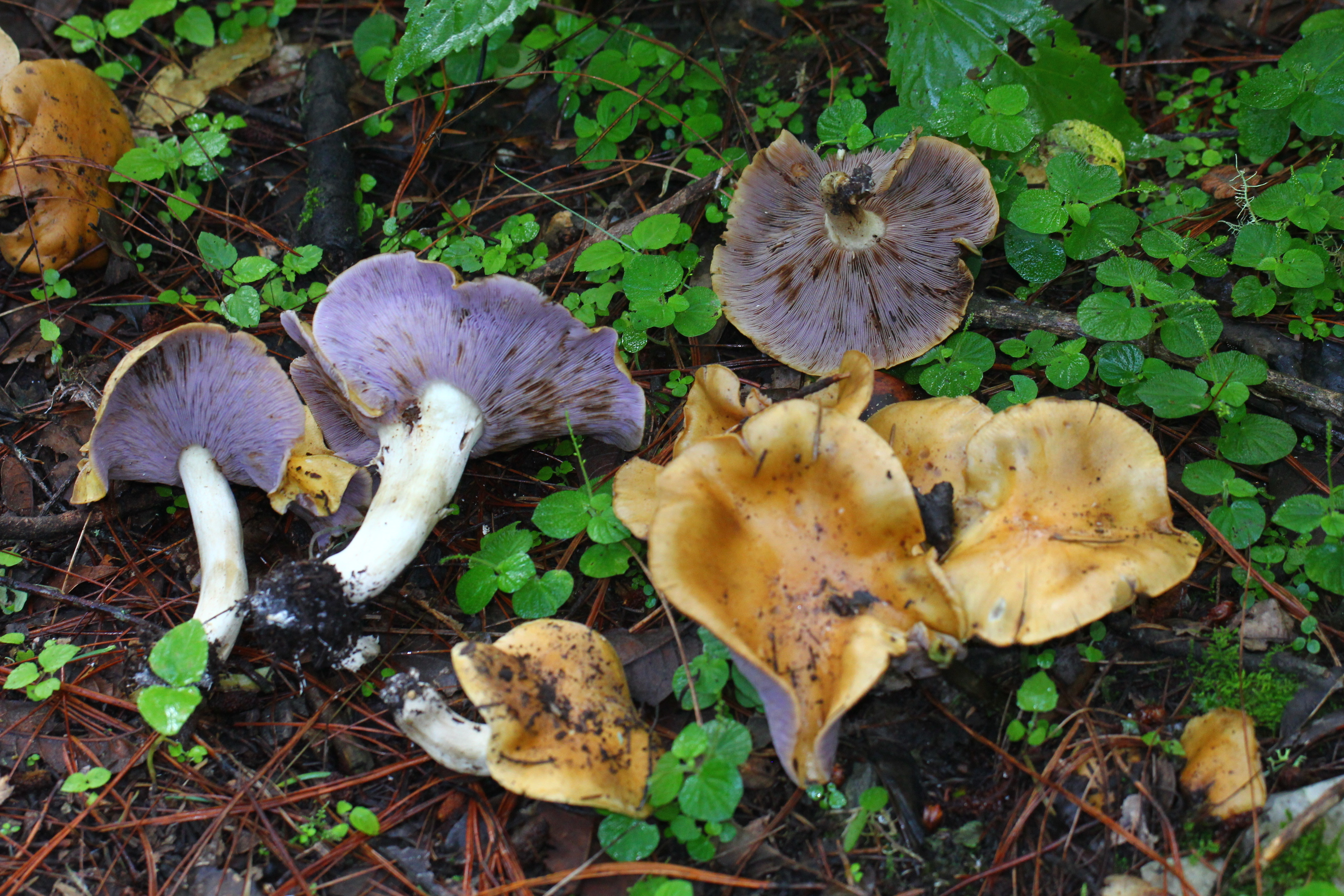
- Tricholosporum porphyrophyllum

Scientific classification
- Kingdom: Fungi
- Division: Basidiomycota
- Class: Agaricomycetes
- Order: Agaricales
- Family: Tricholomataceae
- Genus: Tricholosporum
- Species: T. porphyrophyllum

Binomial name
- Tricholosporum porphyrophyllum (S.Imai) Guzmán ex T.J.Baroni

Synonyms
- 1938 Tricholoma porphyrophyllum S.Imai; 1975 Tricholosporum porphyrophyllum (S.Imai) Guzmán

= Tricholosporum porphyrophyllum =

Species of fungus

Tricholosporum porphyrophyllum is a species of fungus in the family Tricholomataceae. It is found in Asia.

== Taxonomy ==
The species was originally described as Tricholoma porphyrophyllum in 1938 by the Japanese mycologist Sanshi Imai. Gaston Guzman transferred it to Tricholosporum in 1975, but this was deemed invalid according to the rules of botanical nomenclature, so Tim Baroni made the transfer official in a 1982 publication.
