= Acanthotrema kalbii =

Scientific classification
- Kingdom: Fungi
- Division: Ascomycota
- Class: Lecanoromycetes
- Order: Graphidales
- Family: Graphidaceae
- Genus: Acanthotrema
- Species: A. kalbii

Binomial name
- Acanthotrema kalbii Lücking (2012)

Species of lichen

Acanthotrema kalbii is a species of corticolous (bark-dwelling) lichen in the family Graphidaceae. First classified as a new species in 2012, the lichen is found in Costa Rica, where it grows in partially shaded areas of disturbed primary forest within the montane rainforest zone. This lichen stands out from its close relative, A. brasilianum, primarily due to the internal structure of its larger ascospores. The inaugural specimen of A. kalbii used for the species' formal description, was located on tree bark in a montane rainforest in the Las Tablas Protected Zone. The lichen is recognisable by its grey-green thallus, which varies from smooth to uneven and produces slender isidia, tiny outgrowths, up to 2 mm in length.

== Taxonomy ==
Lichenologist Robert Lücking first formally described Acanthotrema kalbii as a new species in 2012. Distinguished from A. brasilianum by its larger, regularly submuriform ascospores, A. kalbii is uniquely identifiable. The species was named in recognition of Klaus Kalb, in acknowledgement of his substantial contributions to the study of tropical lichens. The holotype, the original specimen used for the description, was discovered by the author on tree bark in a montane rainforest zone in Las Tablas Protected Zone, Costa Rica, at a height of 1,600 m (5,200 ft).

== Description ==
The thallus, or body, of Acanthotrema kalbii has a grey-green colour and a surface that ranges from smooth to uneven. This lichen produces slender isidia, which are tiny outgrowths, up to 2 mm in length. Within its internal structure, clusters of calcium oxalate crystals can be found in the photobiont layer and/or the medulla. The apothecia, which are typically where the lichen's spores are produced, are erumpent and angular-rounded to lobate, measuring 1–2 mm in diameter. The apothecia bear a grey-purple disc and a pale grey-brown margin. The species' ascospores, fusiform to narrowly ellipsoid in shape, measure 14–20 by 6–8 μm and have 3–5 transverse septa with 0–1 longitudinal septa per segment.

Acanthotrema kalbii and A. brasilianum share a certain degree of similarity. However, revision of collections has shown that the Neotropical collections of A. brasilianum present fusiform to narrowly ellipsoid ascospores, differing from the submuriform ascospores observed in A. kalbii. Moreover, ascospore size among these lichen populations varies greatly, which further contributes to their differentiation. No secondary chemical compounds have been detected in A. kalbii, as per thin-layer chromatography analysis.

== Habitat and distribution ==
Found in Costa Rica's montane rainforest zone, within the Las Tablas Protection Zone, Acanthotrema kalbii prefers the bark of trees in areas of disturbed primary forest. It has been specifically documented near the Las Alturas Station, located in the Talamanca Ridge area. Partial shade seems to be beneficial for its growth, highlighting the lichen's adaptation to understory ecosystems.
