= Los Quetzales National Park =

Costa Rican protected area

- IUCN category II (national park)
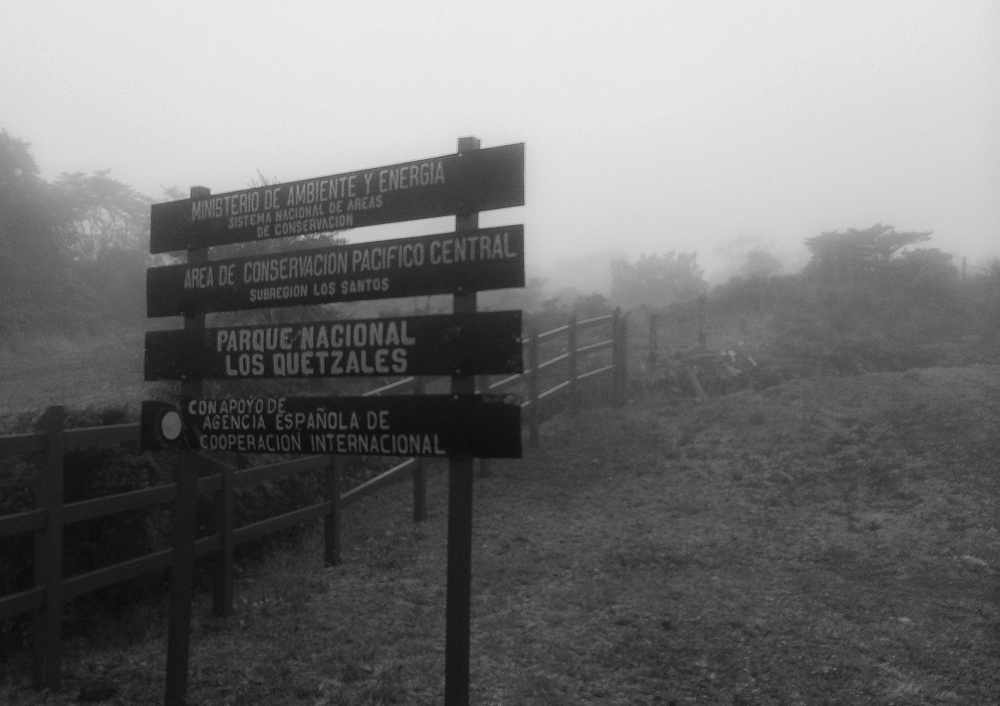
- Visitor entrance to Los Quetzales National Park.
- Los Quetzales National Park area.
- Location: Costa Rica
- Nearest city: San Isidro de El General, Costa Rica
- Coordinates: 9°35′10″N 83°54′26″W
- Area: 50.00 square kilometres (19.31 sq mi)
- Established: 2006
- Governing body: National System of Conservation Areas (SINAC)
- Location in Costa Rica

Ramsar Wetland
- Official name: Turberas de Talamanca
- Designated: 2 February 2003
- Reference no.: 1286

The Los Quetzales National Park (Spanish: Parque Nacional Los Quetzales), located 97 kilometers from San Isidro de El General, in Costa Rica, was created in 2006 by Decree 32981-MINAE. It is managed under the Central Conservation Area of the National System of Conservation Areas.

Stretching across 50.00 square kilometres (19.31 sq mi), the national park has limited facilities including a small ranger station and a single, highly mountainous main road.

The national park is surrounded by the Los Santos Forest Reserve on its north, west and south sides, and by the Tapantí National Park on its northeast side. The park was created by allocating area from the Los Santos Forest Reserve.

== Ecology ==
The park predominantly protects cloud forest and is named for the resplendent quetzal, which inhabits the area.

Part of the Turberas de Talamanca Ramsar site is located within this protected area and shared with Chirripó National Park, Tapantí National Park, Los Santos Forest Reserve, Vueltas Hill Biological Reserve and Macho River Forest Reserve. When the Ramsar site was designated in 2003, the park was still part of Los Santos Forest Reserve.

== Access ==
The northeast border of the protected area corresponds partially to Route 2, Carretera Interamericana Sur (South Inter-American Highway), which is part of the Pan-American Highway and is used to access the park from either the north, coming from the Greater Metropolitan Area (San José and Cartago), or from the south (Pérez Zeledón).
