= Paraguas Lake Lacustrine Wetland =

Protected area in Costa Rica

- Humedal Lacustrino Laguna del Paraguas
- Location within Costa Rica
- Location: Costa Rica
- Coordinates: 8.788°N 82.988°W
- Area: 0.50 square kilometres (0.19 sq mi)
- Established: 23 February 1994
- Governing body: National System of Conservation Areas (SINAC)

Paraguas Lake Lacustrine Wetland (Spanish: Humedal Lacustrino Laguna del Paraguas), is a protected area in Costa Rica, managed under the Pacific La Amistad Conservation Area, it was created in 1994 by decree 22880-MIRENEM.
