= Tricholosporum subporphyrophyllum =

Scientific classification
- Kingdom: Fungi
- Division: Basidiomycota
- Class: Agaricomycetes
- Order: Agaricales
- Family: Tricholomataceae
- Genus: Tricholosporum
- Species: T. subporphyrophyllum

Binomial name
- Tricholosporum subporphyrophyllum Guzmán

Species of fungus

Tricholosporum subporphyrophyllum is a species of fungus in the family Tricholomataceae. Found in Mexico, the species was described as new to science in 1975 by Mexican mycologist Gaston Guzman.
