= Tricholosporum atroviolaceum =

Scientific classification
- Kingdom: Fungi
- Division: Basidiomycota
- Class: Agaricomycetes
- Order: Agaricales
- Family: Tricholomataceae
- Genus: Tricholosporum
- Species: T. atroviolaceum

Binomial name
- Tricholosporum atroviolaceum (Murrill) T.J.Baroni

Synonyms
- 1938 Gymnopus atroviolaceus Murrill; 1938 Collybia atroviolacea (Murrill) Murrill

Species of fungus

Tricholosporum atroviolaceum is a species of fungus in the family Tricholomataceae.

== Taxonomy ==
The species was first described as Gymnopus atroviolaceus by American mycologist William Alphonso Murrill in 1938, based on a collection made in Gainesville, Florida. It was transferred to the genus Tricholosporum in 1982 by Tim Baroni.
