= Los Santos Forest Reserve =

Protected area in Costa Rica

- Reserva Forestal Los Santos
- IUCN category VI (protected area with sustainable use of natural resources)
- Location: Costa Rica
- Coordinates: 9.573°N 83.847°W
- Area: 561.03 square kilometres (216.61 sq mi)
- Established: 12 October 1975
- Governing body: National System of Conservation Areas (SINAC)

Ramsar Wetland
- Official name: Turberas de Talamanca
- Designated: 2 February 2003
- Reference no.: 1286

The Los Santos Forest Reserve (Spanish: Reserva Forestal Los Santos) is a protected area in Costa Rica, managed under the Central Conservation Area and Pacific La Amistad Conservation Area. It was created in 1975 by Decree 5389-A.

This forest reserve borders the Los Quetzales National Park on the north, west and south sides.

== Ecology ==
Part of the Turberas de Talamanca Ramsar site, designated in February 2003, is located within this protected area and shared with Tapantí National Park, Los Quetzales National Park, Macho River Forest Reserve, Vueltas Hill Biological Reserve and Chirripó National Park.
