= Macho River Forest Reserve =

Protected area in Costa Rica

- Reserva Forestal Río Macho
- IUCN category VI (protected area with sustainable use of natural resources)
- Location within Costa Rica
- Location: Costa Rica
- Coordinates: 9.675°N 83.686°W
- Area: 227.10 square kilometres (87.68 sq mi)
- Established: 23 January 1964
- Governing body: National System of Conservation Areas (SINAC)

Ramsar Wetland
- Official name: Turberas de Talamanca
- Designated: 2 February 2003
- Reference no.: 1286

The Macho River Forest Reserve (Spanish: Reserva Forestal Río Macho) is a protected area in Costa Rica, managed under the Central Conservation Area. It was created in 1964 by Executive Decree 3417.

== Ecology ==
Part of the Turberas de Talamanca Ramsar site, designated in February 2003, is located within this protected area and shared with Chirripó National Park, Los Quetzales National Park, Tapantí National Park, Los Santos Forest Reserve and the Vueltas Hill Biological Reserve.
