= Tapantí National Park =

National park of Costa Rica

Tapantí - Cerro de la Muerte Massif National Park
- IUCN category II (national park)
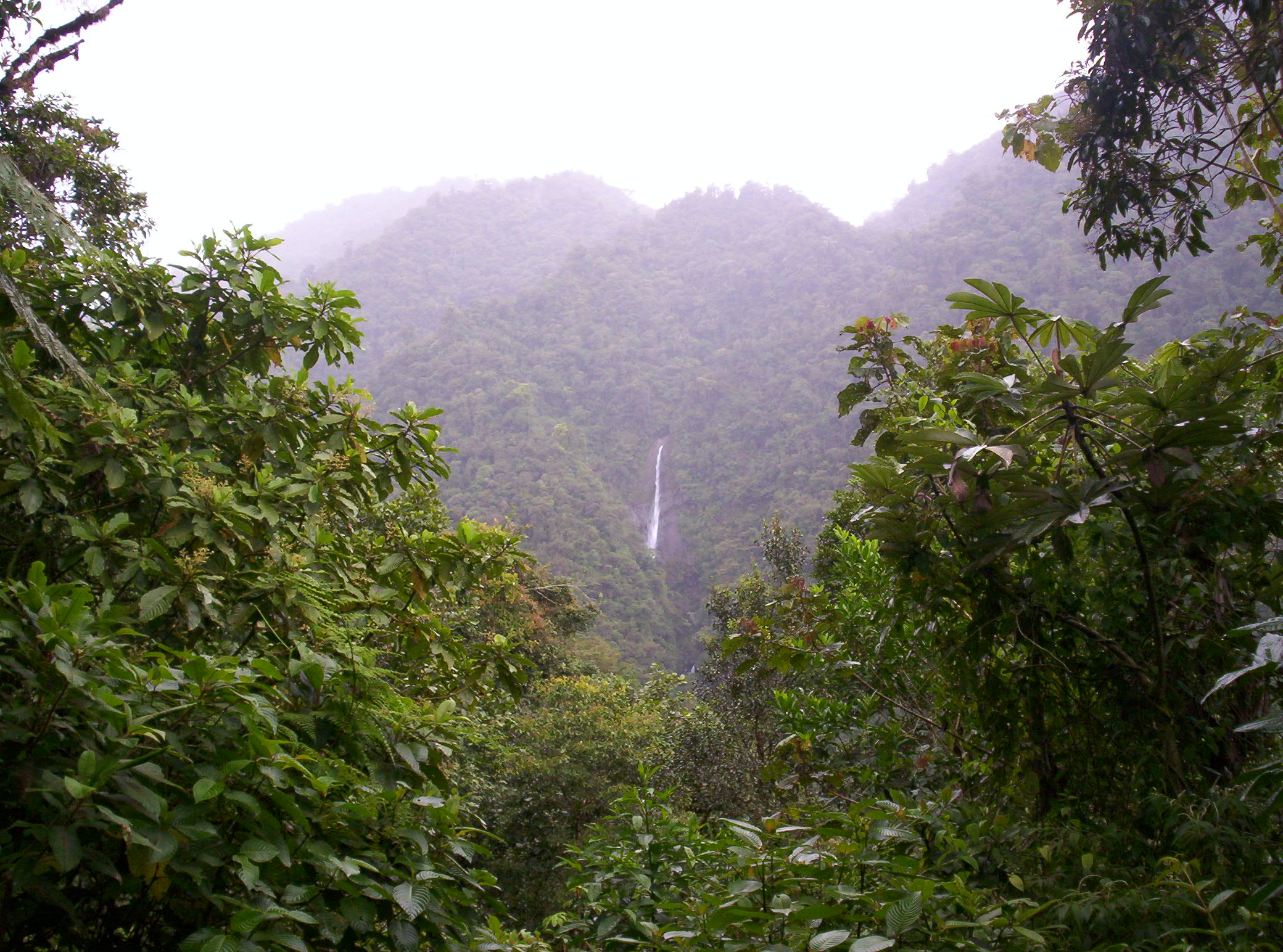
- Waterfall seen from the visitor observatory
- Interactive map of Tapantí - Cerro de la Muerte Massif National Park
- Location: Costa Rica
- Nearest city: Cartago
- Coordinates: 9°46′14″N 83°47′59″W
- Area: 583.20 square kilometres (225.17 sq mi)
- Established: February 1, 1982
- Governing body: National System of Conservation Areas (SINAC)
- Website: Parque Nacional Tapantí

Ramsar Wetland
- Official name: Turberas de Talamanca
- Designated: 2 February 2003
- Reference no.: 1286

UNESCO World Heritage Site
- Official name: Talamanca Range-La Amistad Reserves / La Amistad National Park
- Type: Natural
- Criteria: vii, viii, ix, x
- Designated: 1983 (7th session)
- Reference no.: 205bis
- Region: Latin America and the Caribbean
- Extensions: 1990

Tapantí - Cerro de la Muerte Massif National Park, (Spanish: Parque Nacional Tapantí - Macizo Cerro de la Muerte), is a national park in the Central Conservation Area of Costa Rica located on the edge of the Talamanca Range, near Cartago. It protects forests to the north of Chirripó National Park, and also contains part of the Orosí River. The area known as Cerro de la Muerte Massif was added to the park on January 14, 2000.

The southwest border of the protected area corresponds partially to the Route 2, Carretera Interamericana Sur (South Inter-American Highway). The Los Quetzales National Park and Los Santos Forest Reserve are located on the other side of this road.

== Ecology ==
The park covers 583.20 square kilometres (225.17 sq mi) and two ecosystems: lower montane rain forest and pre-montane rain forest. These forests provide habitat for some 45 mammal species, including the Baird's tapir, kinkajou, white-faced capuchin monkey, paca, agouti, ocelot, and jaguarundi. The park is home to about 260 bird species, including sparrow hawks, resplendent quetzals, emerald toucanets, and violaceous trogons. There are 28 species of reptiles and 28 species of amphibians, and a large insect population that includes the Thysania agrippina, the largest moth in the Americas.

In 2009, three new species of Lepanthes orchids were discovered in the park, which is so far their only known habitat. All three species, L. graciosa, L. machogaffensis, and L. pelvis, are miniature orchids and none is longer than 5 mm. They were discovered by a team from the Lankester Botanical Garden and the University of Costa Rica.

Part of the Turberas de Talamanca Ramsar site is located within this protected area and shared with Chirripó National Park, Los Quetzales National Park, Macho River Forest Reserve, Vueltas Hill Biological Reserve and Los Santos Forest Reserve.
