= Acanthotrema frischii =

Scientific classification
- Domain: Eukaryota
- Kingdom: Fungi
- Division: Ascomycota
- Class: Lecanoromycetes
- Order: Graphidales
- Family: Graphidaceae
- Genus: Acanthotrema
- Species: A. frischii

Binomial name
- Acanthotrema frischii Lücking (2010)

Species of lichen

Acanthotrema frischii is a species of corticolous (bark-dwelling) lichen in the family Graphidaceae. Found in the East Province of Cameroon, A. frischii has a smooth, olive-green thallus, and its broadly oval, glass-like ascospores. Although initially believed to represent Acanthotrema brasilianum, a Neotropical species, it was identified as a distinct species due to differences in ascospore structure.

== Taxonomy ==
Acanthotrema frischii was formally described as a new species by lichenologist Robert Lücking. This species was found in Yokadouma, in the East Province of Cameroon in April 1999. It was initially thought to represent Acanthotrema brasilianum, a species native to the Neotropics. However, differences in the ascospores, a crucial feature of lichens, revealed that it was, in fact, a separate species. The species name honours Andreas Frisch, in recognition of his contributions to the study of the Graphidaceae. In later molecular phylogenetic analysis, A. frischii was shown to be a close relative to the clade containing Diploschistes species.

== Description ==
The thallus of Acanthotrema frischii is smooth with an olive-green colour. The unique trait of this lichen lies in its ascospores, which are broadly oval with blunt ends. These ascospores feature thin septa and walls, measuring around 8–12 by 5–6 μm. They are hyaline, characterised by a transparency that gives them a glassy appearance, and are surrounded by a halo up to 4 μm thick. The apothecia, which are the structures responsible for producing spores, start as fissurinoid (i.e., with the apothecia opening by irregular cracks in thallus) but become round to irregular when mature, measuring 1–2 mm in diameter. The species was found not to produce any lichen secondary metabolites.

== Similar species ==
Although it shares similarities with Acanthotrema brasilianum, a Neotropical species, Acanthotrema frischii is distinguished by its ascospores. The ascospores of A. frischii are broadly oval with blunt ends and a thick halo, unlike the fusiform ascospores with acute ends and a thin or indistinct halo found in the A. brasilianum.

== Habitat and distribution ==
Acanthotrema frischii was discovered in Yokadouma located in the East Province of Cameroon. At the time of its publication, additional information about the species' distribution or preferred habitats had not been reported.
