= Tricholosporum pseudosordidum =

Scientific classification
- Kingdom: Fungi
- Division: Basidiomycota
- Class: Agaricomycetes
- Order: Agaricales
- Family: Tricholomataceae
- Genus: Tricholosporum
- Species: T. pseudosordidum

Binomial name
- Tricholosporum pseudosordidum (Singer) T.J.Baroni

Synonyms
- 1945 Tricholoma pseudosordidum Singer; 1949 Melanoleuca pseudosordida (Singer) Murrill

Species of fungus

Tricholosporum pseudosordidum is a species of fungus in the family Tricholomataceae. It is known from Florida.

== Taxonomy ==
The species was originally described as Tricholoma pseudosordidum by Rolf Singer in 1945, and William Murrill transferred it to Melanoleuca in 1949. Tim Baroni moved it to Tricholosporum in 1982.
