= Las Tablas Protected Zone =

Protected area in Costa Rica

- Zona Protectora Las Tablas
- IUCN category VI (protected area with sustainable use of natural resources)
- Location within Costa Rica
- Location: Costa Rica
- Coordinates: 8.966°N 82.833°W
- Area: 199.81 square kilometres (77.15 sq mi)
- Established: 9 September 1981
- Governing body: National System of Conservation Areas (SINAC)

Las Tablas Protected Zone (Spanish: Zona Protectora Las Tablas), is a protected area in Costa Rica, managed under the Pacific La Amistad Conservation Area, it was created in 1981 by law 6638.
