= Autoridad Reguladora de Servicios Públicos =

Autoridad Reguladora de Servicios Públicos (ARESEP) (English Public Service Regulating Authority) is the Costa Rican government institution that is in charge of regulating prices for public services within the country.

These services include:

- Public transportation services
- Telecommunication services
- Water and sewage services
- Post office and mail services
- Electricity Services
