= Vueltas Hill Biological Reserve =

Protected area in Costa Rica

- Reserva Biológica Cerro Vueltas
- IUCN category Ia (strict nature reserve)
- Location within Costa Rica
- Location: Costa Rica
- Coordinates: 9.616°N 83.860°W
- Area: 7.93 square kilometres (3.06 sq mi)
- Established: 19 May 1994
- Governing body: National System of Conservation Areas (SINAC)

Ramsar Wetland
- Official name: Turberas de Talamanca
- Designated: 2 February 2003
- Reference no.: 1286

Vueltas Hill Biological Reserve (Spanish: Reserva Biológica Cerro Vueltas) is a protected area in Costa Rica, managed under the Central Conservation Area. It was created in 1994 by Decree 23260-MIRENEM.

== Ecology ==
Part of the Turberas de Talamanca Ramsar site, designated in February 2003, is located within this protected area and shared with Chirripó National Park, Tapantí National Park, Los Santos Forest Reserve and Macho River Forest Reserve.
