= Chirripó National Park =

National park in Costa Rica

- IUCN category II (national park)
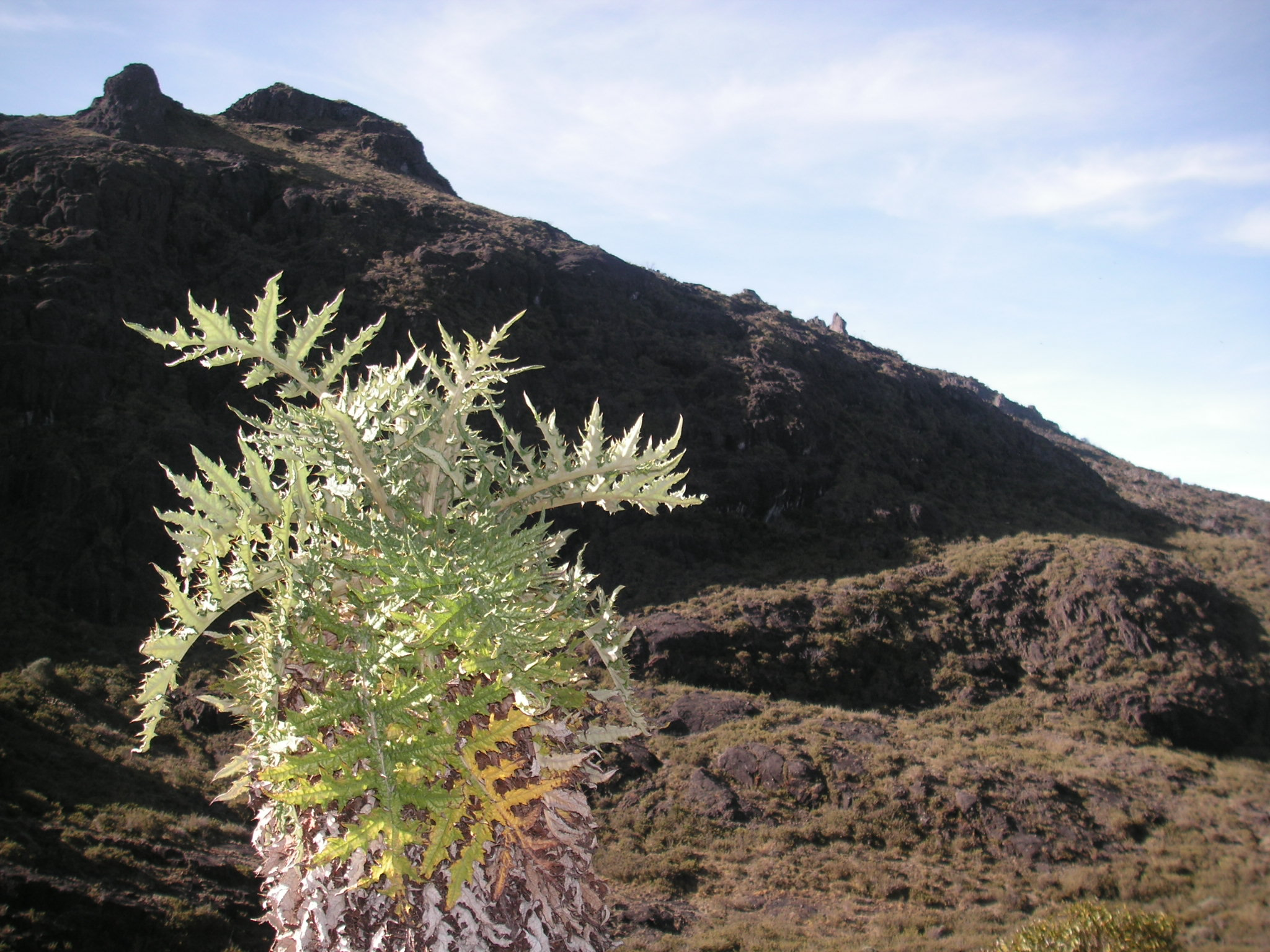
- Páramo climate plants in Chirripó National Park.
- Interactive map of Chirripó National Park
- Location: Costa Rica
- Nearest city: San Isidro del General
- Coordinates: 9°28′48″N 83°28′48″W
- Area: 508.49 km^{2} (196.33 sq mi)
- Established: 19 August 1975
- Governing body: National System of Conservation Areas (SINAC)

Ramsar Wetland
- Official name: Turberas de Talamanca
- Designated: 2 February 2003
- Reference no.: 1286

UNESCO World Heritage Site
- Official name: Talamanca Range-La Amistad Reserves / La Amistad National Park
- Type: Natural
- Criteria: vii, viii, ix, x
- Designated: 1983 (7th session)
- Reference no.: 205bis
- Region: Latin America and the Caribbean
- Extensions: 1990

Chirripó National Park is a national park of Costa Rica, encompassing parts of three provinces: San José, Limón and Cartago. It was established in 1975. It is part of the Talamanca Range-La Amistad Reserves/La Amistad National Park UNESCO World Heritage Site due to its unique environment and outstanding biological diversity.

It is named for its most prominent feature, Cerro Chirripó, which at 3,821 m (12,536 ft) is the highest mountain in Costa Rica and the 38th most prominent peak in the world.

== Climate ==
The climate is dominated by two seasons: a dry season lasting from December to April and a wet season from May to November.

During the dry season, the upper regions are susceptible to fires. The latest recorded fires have occurred in 1953, 1958, 1976, 1977, 1981 and 1992. The 1992 fire affected over 20 km^{2} (7.7 sq mi) of vegetation and forced the administration to close the park for four months.

The park is one of the coldest places in Costa Rica. In fact, the coldest temperature (−9 °C (16 °F)) ever documented in Costa Rica was recorded here.

== Ecology ==
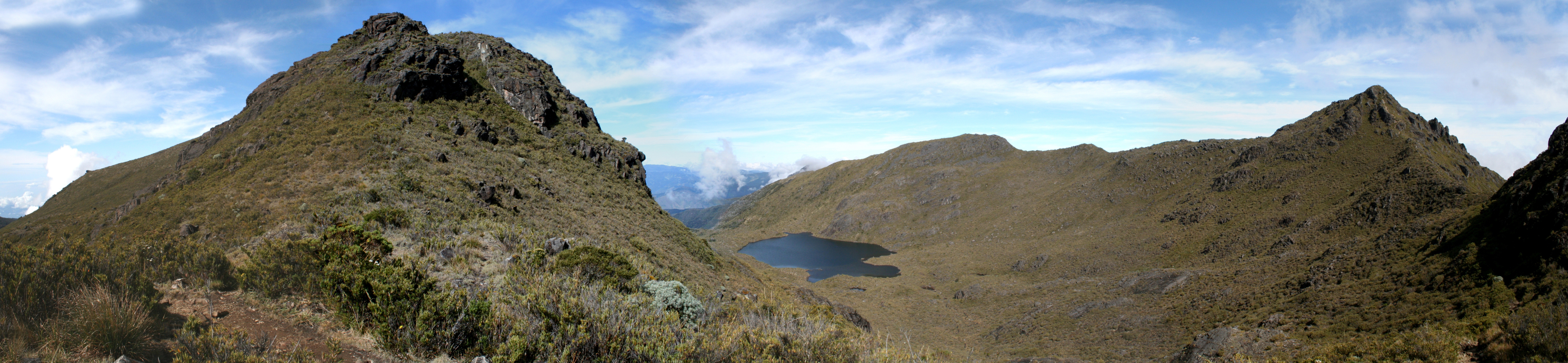
The Valle de los Lagos in Chirripó National Park.

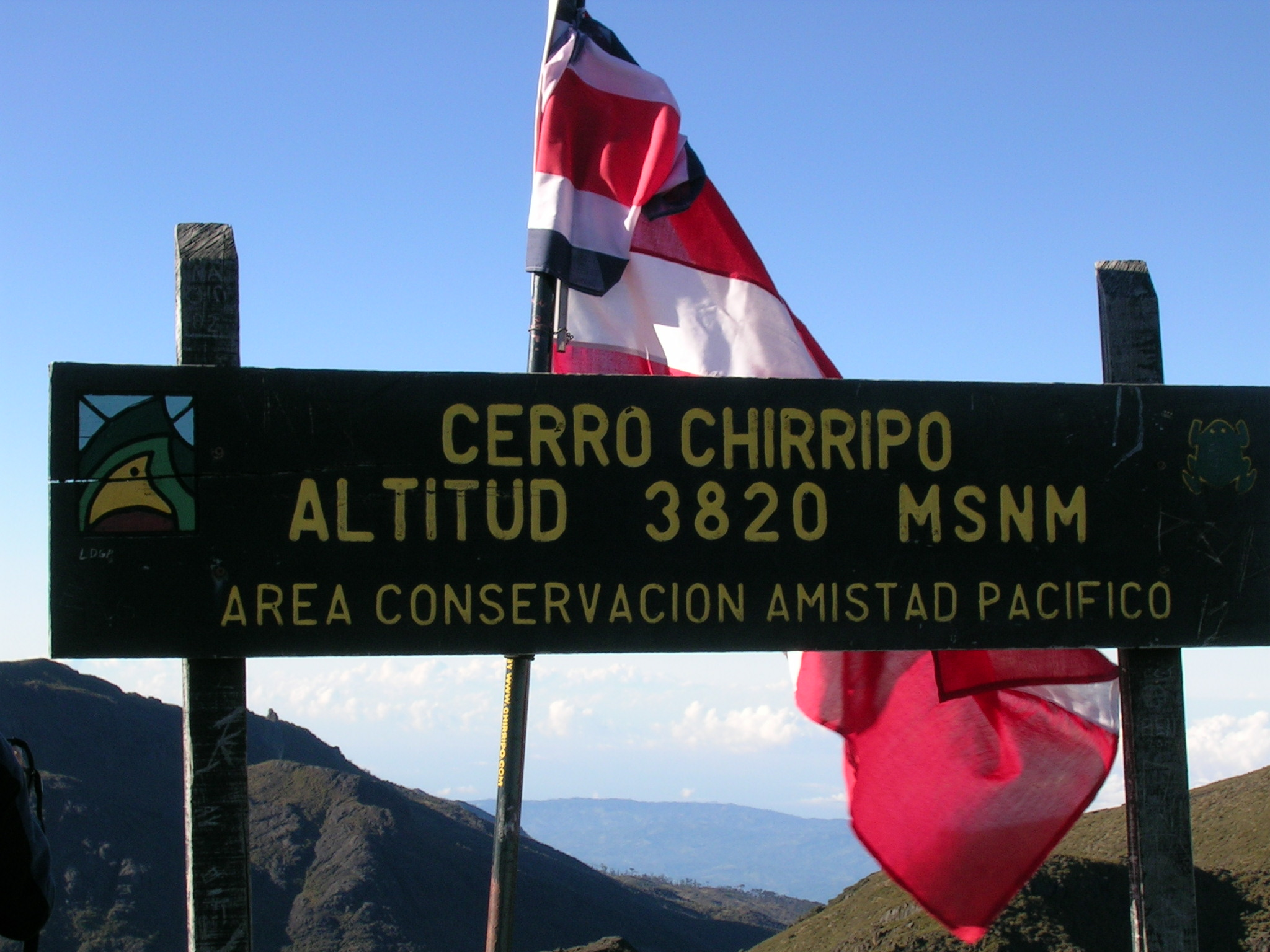
Cerro Chirripó.

In terms of Holdridge life zones, the park can be categorized into five ecosystems: lowland tropical wet forest, premontane tropical wet forest, lower montane wet forest, montane wet forest and subalpine wet forest (páramo). Most of the park consists of both primary rain forests and primary cloud forests. Around 2,740 m (8,990 ft) it changes to wet desert. Part of the Turberas de Talamanca Ramsar site, designated in February 2003, is located within this protected area and shared with Tapantí National Park, Los Quetzales National Park, Macho River Forest Reserve, Vueltas Hill Biological Reserve and Los Santos Forest Reserve.

Notable landscape features within the park include The Crestones, a series of distinctive rock formations declared a national symbol of Costa Rica, and Sabana de los Leones, the only high-altitude savannah in the country.
