= List of power stations in Costa Rica =

Map

The following page lists power stations in Costa Rica. Most of them are managed by Instituto Costarricense de Electricidad.

== Installed generating capacity and production ==
Costa Rica had an estimated installed generating capacity of 3,039 MW in 2012 and produced an estimated 10.05 billion kWh in 2012. According to La Nación, Costa Rica in 2014 had an installed capacity of 2,732 MW with a peak consumption of 1,604 MW.

== Geothermal ==
Geothermal power plants with a nameplate capacity > 100 MW.

Name	Capacity (MW)
Miravalles	115

There are further geothermal power plants with a smaller capacity.

== Hydroelectric ==
Hydroelectric power plants with a nameplate capacity > 30 MW.

Name	Capacity (MW)	River/lake
Angostura	210	Reventazón
Cachí	102	Reventazón
Corobici	180	Arenal
La Garita	30	Virilla
La Joya	50	Reventazón
Peñas Blancas	38	Peñas Blancas
Pirrís	134	Pirrís
Sangregado	157	Arenal
Reventazón	305	Reventazón
Río Macho	120	Macho
Sandillal	32	Arenal
Toro II	65	Toro
Ventanas-Garita	97	Virilla

There are further hydroelectric power plants with a smaller capacity. The proposed 630 MW El Diquís dam was not built.

== Thermal ==
Thermal power plants with a nameplate capacity ≥ 200 MW.

Name	Location	Capacity (MW)	Fuel	Owner
Planta Térmica Garabito	Montes de Oro, Puntarenas	200	Heavy fuel oil (bunker)	Instituto Costarricense de Electricidad

There are further thermal power plants with a smaller capacity.

== Wind ==
Currently, there are 13 wind farms in Costa Rica. The three wind farms with the biggest capacity are:

Name	Capacity (MW)	Turbines
Chiripa	49.5	33
La Gloria	49.5	55
Orosi	50	25

== Exhaustive list ==
This list includes all known power plants of any kind of fuel source in Costa Rica, some minor power plants might be missing, and locations and coordinates must be provided for minor projects, also included are recently closed or decommissioned plants, as well as projects under construction as of 2020.

Name	Type	Capacity (MW)	Location	Coordinates	Operator, notes
Arenal	hydroelectric	157.39	Guanacaste	10.475389°N 84.998988°W	ICE (opened 4 December 1979)
Aguas Zarcas	hydroelectric	14.47	La Palmera, Aguas Zarcas, San Carlos, Alajuela	10.424087°N 84.364701°W	COOPELESCA
Angostura	hydroelectric	210.00		9.870036°N 83.640611°W	ICE
Cachí	hydroelectric	102.00		9.840047°N 83.804215°W	ICE
Chiripa	wind	49.50	Tilarán	10.443127°N 84.917187°W	Accione, BOP 20 years, then ICE. 33 towers.
Chocosuela I	hydroelectric	8.00	Alajuela	10.294293°N 84.462734°W	COOPELESCA
Chocosuela II	hydroelectric	10.00	Alajuela	10.326648°N 84.484375°W	COOPELESCA
Chocosuela III	hydroelectric	5.00	Alajuela	10.347126°N 84.491195°W	COOPELESCA
Chucás	hydroelectric, Tárcoles River	50.00	Balsa, Atenas, San José	9.932170°N 84.382983°W	P.H. Chucás, will transfer to ICE 20 years later.
Corobicí	hydroelectric	180.00		10.469500°N 85.076300°W	ICE
El Diquís	hydroelectric	0.00		9.082222°N 83.295556°W	ICE, cancelled project
Garabito	thermal, bunker	200.00		10.044014°N 84.760111°W	ICE
La Garita	hydroelectric	30.00		9.989096°N 84.340904°W	ICE
La Joya	hydroelectric	50.00		9.854085°N 83.686804°W	ICE
Moín	thermal, diesel	0.00		9.993492°N 83.100049°W	ICE, was 266MW, closed 2016 after Reventazón.
Peñas	hydroelectric	38.00		10.391447°N 84.437978°W	ICE
Pirrís	hydroelectric	134.00		9.642691°N 84.102316°W	ICE
Sangregado	hydroelectric	157.00		10.475500°N 84.998900°W	ICE
Reventazón	hydroelectric	305.00		10.088530°N 83.570852°W	ICE
Río Macho	hydroelectric	120.00		9.775700°N 83.841400°W	ICE
Sandillal	hydroelectric	31.97		10.464500°N 85.103400°W	ICE, opened 1992
Dengo	hydroelectric	174.01		10.469558°N 85.076375°W	ICE, opened 1982
Toro I	hydroelectric	27.00		10.261757°N 84.265149°W	ICE
Toro II	hydroelectric	65.00		10.281508°N 84.263132°W	ICE
Toro III	hydroelectric	48.00		10.335075°N 84.247014°W	ICE
Ventanas-Garita	hydroelectric	97.00		9.934241°N 84.359443°W	ICE
Las Pailas I	geothermal	35.00	Guanacaste	10.756744°N 85.359527°W	BCIE-ICE
Las Pailas II	geothermal	55.00	Guanacaste	10.757839°N 85.346397°W	ICE
Río Lajas	hydroelectric	11.00	Turrialba	9.942638°N 83.633161°W	Hidroelectrica Rio Lajas S.A., 9.954603°N 83.649552°W
Sigifredo Solís Solís Hydroelectric Center	hydroelectric	26.00	San Ramón, Alajuela	10.365099°N 84.629682°W	CONELECTRICAS R.L.
San Lorenzo Hydroelectric Center	hydroelectric	17.73	San Ramón, Alajuela	10.312445°N 84.546914°W	CONELECTRICAS R.L.
Los Negros Hydroelectric Plant	hydroelectric	17.00	Aguas Claras, Upala, Alajuela	10.853849°N 85.205025°W	ESPH S.A. and GELA-BC Marshall
Los Negros II Hydroelectric Plant	hydroelectric	28.00	Cuatro Bocas, Aguas Claras, Upala, Alajuela	10.884509°N 85.186457°W	ESPH S.A.
Balsa Inferior Hydroelectric Plant	hydroelectric	37.50	Florencia, San Carlos	10.302213°N 84.524703°W	CNFL
Belén	hydroelectric	10.50	Pozos, Santa Ana	9.960766°N 84.212648°W	CNFL
Brasil	hydroelectric	27.00	Brasil, Santa Ana	9.940538°N 84.234863°W	CNFL
Cote	hydroelectric	6.80	Tilarán	10.555756°N 84.914941°W	CNFL
Daniel Gutiérrez	hydroelectric	21.00	Los Ángeles, San Ramón	10.254066°N 84.519064°W	CNFL
El Encanto	hydroelectric	8.60	Acapulco y Pitahaya, Puntarenas	10.151646°N 84.778535°W	CNFL 2009- Reservoir at 10.182469°N 84.742603°W
Electriona	hydroelectric	5.80	Uruca, San José	9.966192°N 84.162564°W	CNFL
Río Segundo	hydroelectric	1.00	Río Segundo, Alajuela	9.999720°N 84.179877°W	CNFL
Ventanas	hydroelectric	10.00	Guácima, Alajuela	9.925437°N 84.304293°W	CNFL
Planta Eólica Valle Central	wind	15.30	Salitral, Santa Ana	9.892037°N 84.198686°W	CNFL
Nuestro Amo	hydroelectric	0.00		9.938417°N 84.265547°W	CNFL Destroyed in 2010, reservoir is empty. 8.80 MW capacity.
Miravalles Solar Park	solar	0.94		10.718467°N 85.179528°W	ICE, opened 2012 4300 panels rated 235w
Borinquen (project)	geothermal	0.00			ICE, JICA
Miravalles III	geothermal	26.00		10.717899°N 85.181374°W	ICE
Vientos del Este	wind	12.00	Tilarán	10.500519°N 84.963393°W	Ecoenergía
Parque Solar Juanilama	solar	5.00	Belen, Carrillo, Guanacaste	10.393004°N 85.588314°W	COOPEGUANACASTE
Parque Eólico Cacao	wind	6.85	Cacao, Santa Cruz, Guanacaste	10.298766°N 85.553588°W	COOPEGUANACASTE 60 GWh (under construction)
Parque Eólico Río Naranjo	wind	9.00	Río Naranjo, Bagaces, Guanacaste	10.690067°N 85.105301°W	COOPEGUANACASTE, approximated coordinates
Solid Waste Gasification (project)	gasification, waste-to-energy	0.00 (8.00)	Belen, Carrillo, Guanacaste		COOPEGUANACASTE (under construction, 9.00MW - 1.00MW operation)
Bijagua	hydroelectric	17.58	Bijagua, Upala, Alajuela	10.767730°N 85.039018°W	COOPEGUANACASTE
Canalete	hydroelectric	17.50	Bijagua, Upala, Alajuela	10.765184°N 85.038922°W	COOPEGUANACASTE
Planta Eólica Guanacaste	wind	50.00	Bagaces, Guanacaste	10.726437°N 85.267410°W	ICE
Central Hidroeléctrica Cubujuquí	hydroelectric	22.40	Horquetas, Sarapiquí, Heredia	10.285643°N 83.947962°W	COOPELESCA
Central Hidroeléctrica Platanar	hydroelectric	15.50	San Carlos, Alajuela	10.405560°N 84.443107°W	COOPELESCA
Central Hidroeléctrica La Esperanza	hydroelectric	5.51	La Tigra, San Carlos, Alajuela	10.331353°N 84.580158°W	COOPELESCA
Torito	hydroelectric, Reventazón	50.00	Pavones, Turrialba, Cartago	9.949481°N 83.622542°W	Gas Natural Fenosa, 2015 then BOT to ICE
Caño Grande I	hydroelectric, Caño River	2.50	Venecia, San Carlos, Alajuela	10.373408°N 84.282039°W	Hidro Venecia
Caño Grande II	hydroelectric, Caño River	0.25	Venecia, San Carlos, Alajuela		Hidro Venecia
Caño Grande III	hydroelectric, Caño River	3.00	Venecia, San Carlos, Alajuela		Hidro Venecia
El Embalse	hydroelectric	2.00	San Carlos, Alajuela		1997
Santa Rufina	hydroelectric	0.32	Sarchí, Alajuela		
Hospital	hydroelectric	1.60	San Carlos, Alajuela		
Chimurria (project)	hydroelectric	0.00 (5.20)	Upala, Alajuela		
Aguas Zarcas Superior (project)	hydroelectric	0.00 (8.05)	San Carlos, Alajuela		
San Joaquín-Los Santos (project)	hydroelectric	0.00 (29.00)	Dota San José and Tarrazú San José		
Choco Florencia (project)	hydroelectric	0.00 (54.00)	San Carlos, Alajuela and San Ramón, Alajuela		
Torito (project)	hydroelectric	0.00 (9.00)	Sarchí, Alajuela		
Campos Azules	wind	14.00	Tilarán, Guanacaste		
Altamira	wind	14.00	Tilarán, Guanacaste		
Vientos de Miramar	wind	14.00	Liberia, Guanacaste		
Vientos de la Perla	wind	14.00	Liberia, Guanacaste		
Los Santos	wind	12.00	San Cristóbal, Desamparados	9.777102°N 83.995826°W	
Mogote	wind	21.00	Bagaces, Guanacaste		
Tilawind	wind	21.00	Tilarán, Guanacaste	10.485396°N 85.004851°W	
Orosí	wind	50.00	Liberia, Guanacaste	10.863167°N 85.432110°W	(25 × 2MW)
San Rafael (closed)	hydroelectric	0.00 (0.30)	Naranjo, Alajuela		
Parque Solar Cooperativo	solar	5.00	Santa Rosa, Pocosol, Alajuela	10.593347°N 84.511786°W	COOPELESCA
Tuis	hydroelectric (Tuis river)	1.89	Turrialba, Cartago	9.831909°N 83.571877°W	JASEC
Birris	hydroelectric (Tuis river)	1.89	Turrialba, Cartago	9.831909°N 83.571877°W	JASEC
Barro Morado	hydroelectric (Tuis river)	1.89	Agua Caliente, Cartago	9.831909°N 83.571877°W	JASEC
Tejona (2002)	wind	20.00	Santa Rosa, Tilarán	10.522829°N 84.990917°W	ICE (30x0.660), VESTAS V42-660
Poás I	hydroelectric			10.07515°N 84.23593°W	Losko S.A.
Poás II	hydroelectric				Losko S.A.
Don Pedro	hydroelectric			10.288327°N 84.171232°W	
PESA	wind			10.52587°N 84.98564°W	CMI Energía
Doña Julia	hydroelectric				
Peñas Blancas	hydroelectric	38.17	Peñas Blancas, San Ramón, Alajuela	10.38408°N 84.57932°W	

== See also ==
- Renewable energy in Costa Rica
- List of power stations
