= Renewable energy in Costa Rica =

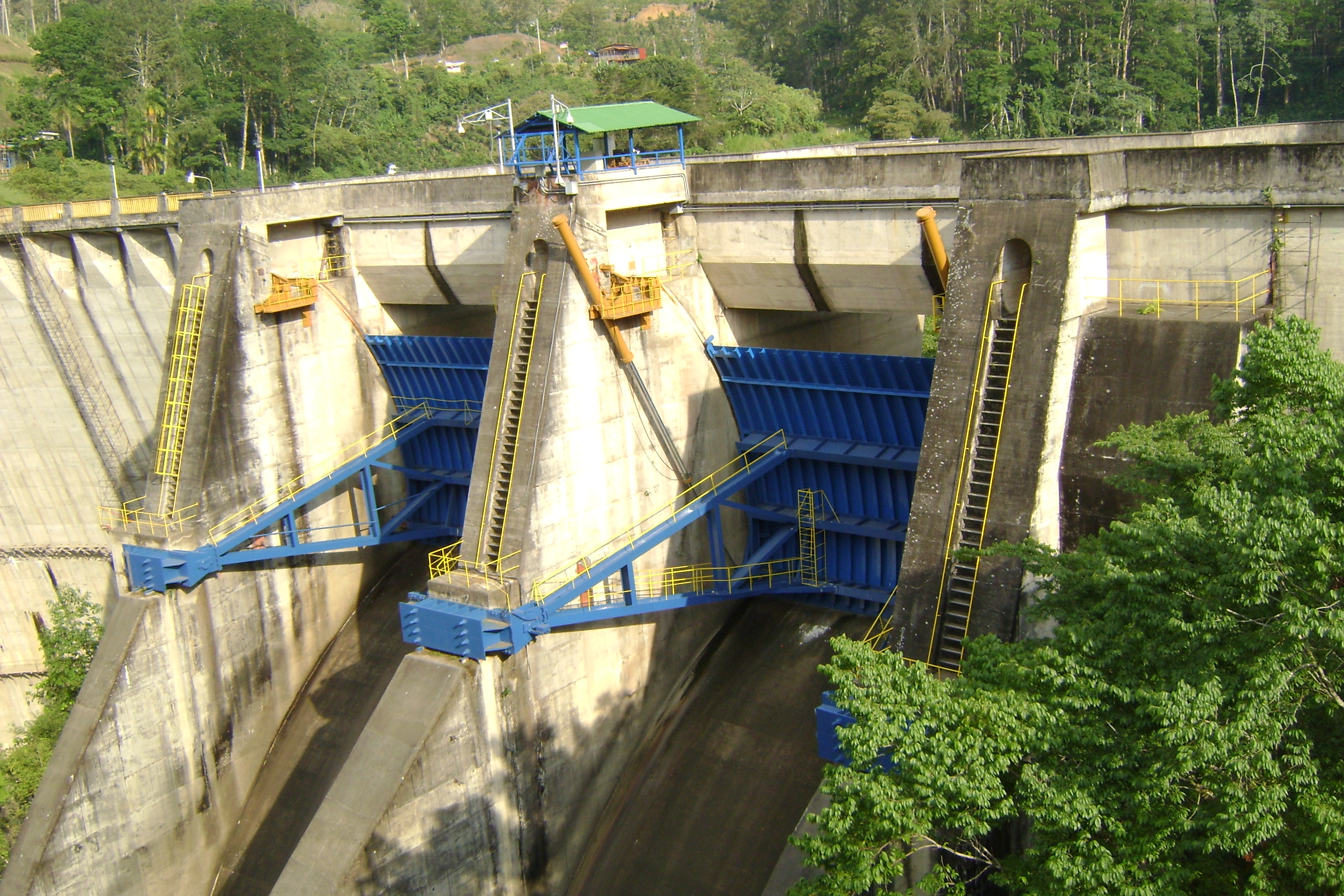
Cachi Hydroelectric Plant, Cachi, Province of Cartago, Costa Rica

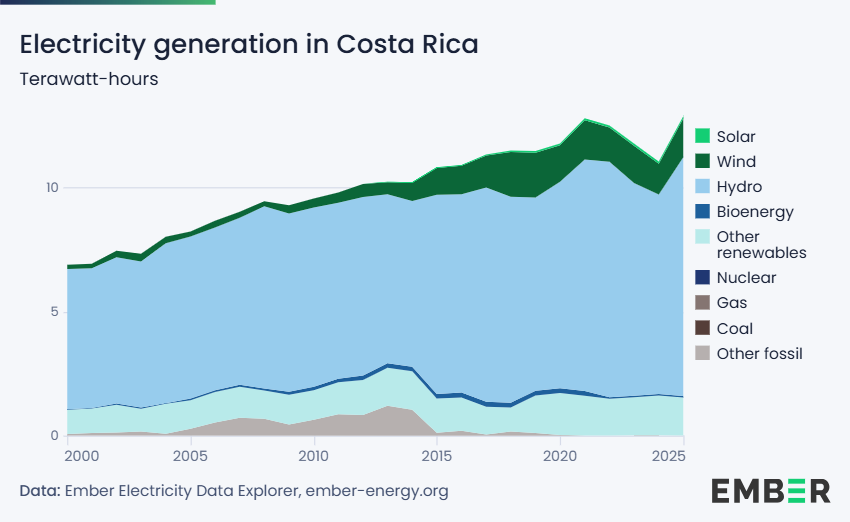
Electricity generation in Costa Rica in terawatt-hours

Renewable energy in Costa Rica supplied about 98.1% of the electrical energy output for the entire nation and imported 807000 MWh of electricity (covering 8% of its annual consumption needs) in 2016. Fossil fuel energy consumption (% of total energy) in Costa Rica was 49.48 as of 2014, with demand for oil increasing in recent years. In 2014, 99% of its electrical energy was derived from renewable energy sources, about 80% of which from hydroelectric power. For the first 75 days of 2015, 100% of its electrical energy was derived from renewable energy sources and in mid 2016 that feat was accomplished for 110 consecutive days despite suboptimal weather conditions.

The 1948 elimination of the military of Costa Rica freed up millions of dollars from the government defense budget which are now invested in social programs and renewable energy generation. As president of Costa Rica in 1948, José Figueres announced that the nation's former military budget would be refocused specifically in healthcare, education, and environmental protection.

Costa Rica has a geographic advantage over others in that its high concentration per capita of rivers, dams, and volcanoes allows for a high renewable energy output. In addition, Costa Rica is the fourth highest nation in terms of rainfall per capita: it receives an average of 2,926 mm of precipitation per year. As a smaller nation with a population of only 5 million and no major industry, the need for strong energy infrastructure is less than for larger countries of higher population density. While Costa Rica's largest source of energy is hydroelectricity, other sources include geothermal energy, biomass, solar power, and wind power.

== Energy consumption in Costa Rica ==
The commercial consumption of energy in Costa Rica has tripled from 1980 to 2009. The electricity consumption has increased by 4.2 times due to a high level of electrification. According to the World Bank, 99.5% of the country's population has access to electricity. Meanwhile, fossil fuel's consumption has increased by 2.4 times, caused by a significant growth of the number of motor vehicles.

The average yearly growing of hydrocarbons consumption in the last 20 years has been about 4.7% and electricity of 5.3%. At this rate, demand of electricity will double in 13 years and hydrocarbons in 15 years. The dependency of Costa Rica for fossil fuels reached in 2009 the 64% of commercial energy while electricity 22%. The rest of the basket consumption is completed by biomass (12%) and other energy products (2%). According with the World Bank, as of 2013, the energy use per capita of Costa Rica was 1029 kg of oil equivalent and the electric power consumption per capita 1955 kWh.

Costa Rica’s new Minister of Environment and Energy, Mónica Navarro del Valle was appointed to office in May 2026. Some see her as a way to reset the country's energy policies and align them with environmental organizations. Others see her as more of the same. As a lawyer, she has represented both environmental organizations and private interests. While some environmentalists remain skeptical due to her ties to real estate and development, many industry groups view her appointment as a positive move toward reducing bureaucratic friction for major infrastructure projects.

== Sources ==
Costa Rica electricity generation by source (2019)
1. Hydropower (67.5%)
2. Wind (17.0%)
3. Geothermal (13.5%)
4. Biomass and solar (0.84%)
5. Non-renewables (1.16%)

=== Hydroelectricity ===
Costa Rica receives about 65% of its energy from hydroelectric plants alone due to its extreme amounts of rainfall and multiple rivers. As the largest source of energy, hydropower represents the most important source of energy in the country, but after inauguration of the Reventazon Dam, the only big hydro project remaining in the planning stage by the Instituto Costarricense de Electricidad (Costa Rican Institute of Electricity) is the El Diquís Hydroelectric Project, which has been suffering significant delays due to pending environmental studies and the indigenous consultation that the state-owned company should conduct in the framework of the United Nations procedures.

Dams

Costa Rica's largest dams include The Lake Arenal Dam, Lake Cachi Dam, the Rio Macho Dam, the Pirrís Dam, the Reventazón Dam and the proposed El Diquís Hydroelectric Project. The Lake Arenal Dam was built in 1979 as the first dam intended solely for hydroelectric power usage. It is located on Lake Arenal next to the famous Arenal Volcano, one of the major tourist attractions in Costa Rica. At about 33 square miles, Lake Arenal provides enough electricity to power 12% of the country. The Lake Cachi, Rio Macho, and Pirrís Dams are all powered by the Rio Reventazón (Reventazón River) and its tributaries.

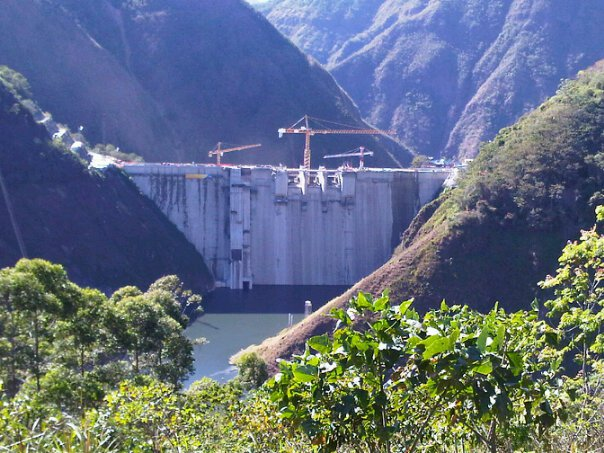
Pirrís Dam under construction in 2011 by the Costa Rican Institute of Electricity (ICE)

The Cachi dam is situated on an artificial lake that was built in the 1970s and produces enough energy to power about 330,000 homes in Costa Rica. It also controls floods and provides recreational activities in the lake. Upstream of Cachi, the Rio Macho hydroelectric power plant has been operating since 1963 to provide hydroelectric power for central Costa Rica. On the downstream, the Pirrís dam is one of the largest dams in Costa Rica and has the potential to power 160,000 homes. It also employs 3,000 Costa Ricans and provides drinking water to 40% of the metropolitan city area. The El Diquís Hydroelectric Project is a proposed hydroelectric system that Costa Rica plans to build as one of the largest Central American hydroelectric plant, located in the Southern Pacific area of the country and is intended to provide the nation with 631MW, enough energy to reach at least one million consumers. The recently opened Reventazón Dam, the current largest hydroelectric project of Central America is located on the Reventazón River, with a generation contribution of 305.5MW to the National Electric System, enough for providing electricity to more than 500,000 families.

=== Geothermal power ===
Geothermal power is a natural energy source that provides subterranean heat and power as a byproduct of volcanic energy. Costa Rica has six currently active volcanoes and dozens of inactive volcanoes. Unlike many other forms of renewable energy, geothermal can be continuously generated and is not dependent on weather. Geothermal energy contributes to about 15% of the energy in the country.

Plants

The North Volcanic Mountain Ridge in Guanacaste is the region of Costa Rica with the most potential for geothermal power generation. Volcanoes in the region include Miravalles, Rincón de la Vieja, and Tenorio.

The Miravalles Geothermal Field, opened in 1994, contains five plants and results in the production of 14% of the National Electric System's power capacity, or about 163 MW. The Pailas Geothermal Power Plant, established in July 2011, produces a total of 55MW and is located just outside Rincón de la Vieja National Park. Rincón de la Vieja is a 600,000 year old volcano and the largest in the northwestern region of Costa Rica. In 2014, Costa Rica's government approved legislation for a $958 million geothermal project in the region to offset the country's reliance on hydropower.

=== Wind power ===
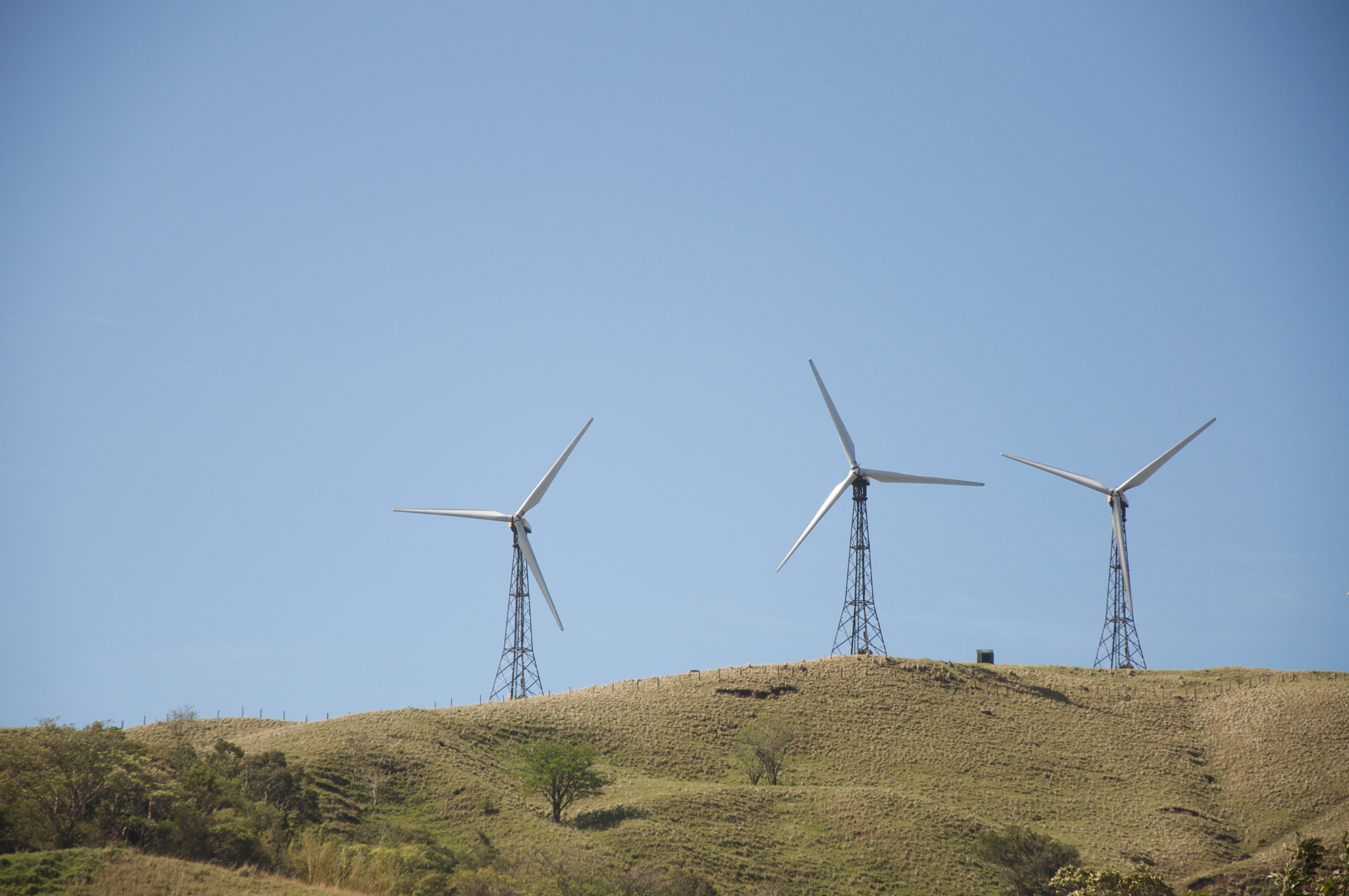
Tejona wind farm, Lake Arenal, Costa Rica

While Costa Rica is not known specifically for its wind power, it was the first country in Latin America, starting in 1996, to harness this resource. There have been a few different wind energy projects developed in the past decade. In March 2015, The Costa Rican Institute of Electricity stated that they plan on doubling the installed wind capacity in the nation by 2017. As of 2011, only 2.1% of energy produced in the nation came from wind power.

Wind Power is primarily used in Costa Rica during the months of December to March, or the dry season. During this period, there is a general decreased rainfall in the nation and hydropower output decreases.

Costa Rica finished 2015 with an additional 59 MW of power generation in wind energy, after the inauguration of the Orosi plant (50 MW) in October and “Vientos del Oeste” project (9 MW). As such, the wind power total capacity in the country is planned to grow from 194 MW in 2015 to 393 MW by 2017, an increase that would represent approximately 10.5% of total electricity production.

Between 1996 and 1999 the first three private wind power plants began operation and in 2002 Tejona plant, built by the Instituto Costarricense de Electricidad. Later, the following plants were opened: Guanacaste (private 2009), Los Santos Wind Farm (built by the public cooperative Coopesantos in 2011 in the heart of Los Santos region, in San José), the “Valle Central” (built by the Compañía Nacional de Fuerza y Luz, or CNFL, a Grupo ICE subsidiary in 2011) and “Chiripa” (private, 2015).

In addition, the construction of five private plants during 2016 (Altamira, Campos Azules, Mogote, Vientos de la Perla y Vientos de Miramar) is planned, as well as another by the Compañía Nacional de Fuerza y Luz in 2017 (Ventus Project).

Farms

Currently, there are nine large wind farms operating in Costa Rica. The Tejona Wind Power Project (TWPP) is a 19.8 MW project, fully operational since 2003, that consists of thirty wind turbines. Most recently, Tila Wind, an even larger 20-MW farm, opened in 2015. Three of the remaining eight are owned by ICE and Compania Nacional de Fuerza y Luz SA (CNFL) and CoopeSantos RL. The remaining five are privately owned, and nearly all of the wind power plants are in the province of Guanacaste.

=== Solar power ===
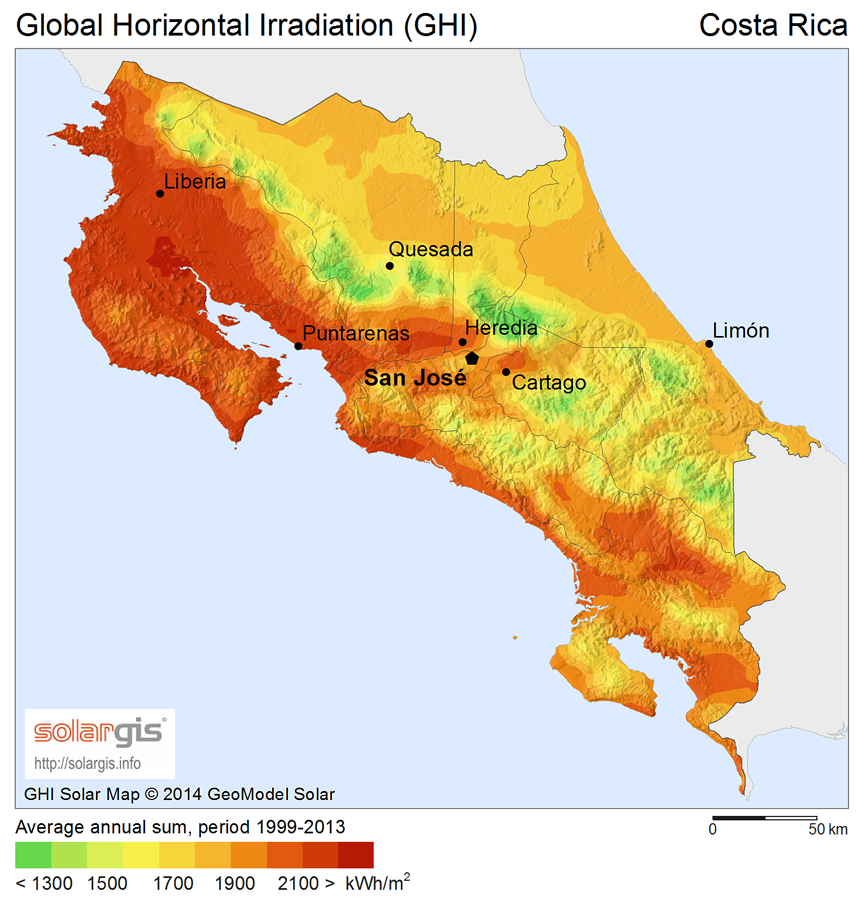
Solar potential of Costa Rica

Like wind power, solar power is another newer energy source in the country. The first solar power projects in the country were established in 1978 by just a few researchers from public universities at the Solar Power Laboratory at the National University. Though still on a smaller scale and mostly privately owned, plans for larger more commercial projects are beginning to break through.

Despite the country has a privileged position near the equator that, combined with the sunny weather during the year, made a solar power potential of more than 144 million MWh/year, solar energy in Costa Rica is in its early stages, and is even falling shorter than the rest of its Central American neighbors. According with an Instituto Costarricense de Electricidad (ICE) study in 2006, the national photovoltaic potential of electric generation for the projected population for 2015 is 222,000 MWh/year.

In 2012, Costa Rica inaugurated the Miravalles Solar Park on the hillside of the Miravalles Volcano. At that time, it was the first of its kind in Costa Rica and the largest solar project in Central America. It was built with the help of the Japanese International Cooperation Agency (JICA). The project's totaling was $11.5 million ($10 million from JICA and $1.5 million from ICE). This plant of 1MW only represents 0.03% of all the capacity installed in the country of 2872 MW.

In 2013, China and Costa Rica signed agreements of US$30 million for financing the installation of 50 thousand solar panels, including a power plant of 10 MW. In addition, in 2014, ICE announced a pilot program for solar energy use in housing that aimed to reach 600,000 clients, but in 2015, the institution ended the plan arguing that the maximum capacity was already reached, rising criticism from the solar energy distributed generation sector. According with ACESOLAR, more than 1000 jobs were at risk for such a decision.

Differences of bureaucracy procedures and technical aspects related to the official national norm "Planeación, Operación y Acceso al Sistema Eléctrico Nacional" (POASEN, in Spanish) on introducing distributed generation have been occurring and causing delays in its implementation through the last years among the main actors of the solar sector: the Ministry of Environment and Energy (MINAE), the Autoridad Reguladora de Servicios Públicos (ARESEP, in Spanish, a public entity that fixes prices and standards on public services), the electricity agencies of the country and the private companies that supply solar panels. One of the main discrepancies between MINAE and ARESEP was the legal nature of net metering, being solved by the Attorney General of the Republic (Procuraduría General de la República, in Spanish) in June 2015. The final resolution stated that distributed generation for self-consumption is not considered a public service in Costa Rica. In October 2015, the government finally published the required regulatory framework that entered into operation in April 2016.

By 2013, countries like Guatemala or Honduras have 85 MW and 388 MW of solar power capacity installed respectively, and Nicaragua and Panama are also ahead of Costa Rica with 1.4 MW and 42.7 MW, according with a report released in July 2016 by the Economic Commission for Latin America and the Caribbean (CEPAL, in Spanish). ICE's position is that the maximum capacity that could be allowed in the National Electric System is 60 MW, distributed in plants of no more than 5 MW across the territory. However, the institution is not reporting to develop more solar projects in the next 10 years in their expansion plan.

=== Biomass ===
As of 2011, only 0.25% of energy produced in Costa Rica came from biomass. The Jorge Manuel Dengo Obregon National Development Plan proposes the development of sustainable biomass for energy. Currently, biomass is primarily used for cooking and heating kitchen appliances to reduce the reliance on petroleum in the household.

== Energy organizations ==
=== Ministry of Environment and Energy ===
The Ministry of Environment and Energy of Costa Rica (MINAE, in English), is the governmental institution responsible of the management of the resources of Costa Rica in the environmental and energy field. The president of Costa Rica, Luis Guillermo Solis Rivera, appointed engineer Irene Cañaz Díaz – a former consultant of the Deutsche Gesellschaft für Internationale Zusammenarbeit - as Vice-minister of Energy in May 2014. According with the Ministry's goals, the energy agenda of Costa Rica aims to generate a more rational and efficient use of energy resources, reduce the dependency to international markets and prepare the country to face climate change and oil depletion. The Viceministry of Energy has three general departments: Sectoral Energy, Hydrocarbons and Transportation and Fuels Marketing.

==== Sectoral Energy Department ====
The Sectoral Energy Department (Dirección Sectorial de Energía, or DSE in Spanish) is responsible to create and promote the integral energy planning, using policies and strategic actions for guaranteeing the supply and quality of energy of Costa Rica. Among the objectives of the DSE, they are responsible of creating the National Energy Plan taking into account the National Development Plan of Costa Rica, as well as the demands of the Ministry of Environment and Energy.

=== Costa Rican Institute of Electricity (ICE) ===
The Costa Rican Institute of Electricity (Spanish: Instituto Costarricense de Electricidad, ICE) was created on 8 April 1949 as an autonomous state-owned institution, as a way to solve the issues of electric energy availability that the country was faced during the 1940s. Since then, the ICE has been executing the electrical development of Costa Rica. In the last years, the institution has evolved as a corporation (Grupo ICE) clustering other public companies that include "Radiográfica Costarricense" (RACSA) and the National Company of Power and Illumination (Compañía Nacional de Fuerza y Luz, CNFL).

"Grupo ICE" has used as primary source the hydroelectricity for developing its infrastructure, but it has also built (and is currently building) several geothermal, wind and solar energy projects. It has more than 15,000 workers and has customer service offices in the whole country. Although the first large-scale hydroelectric station began to function at the beginning of the 1900s, large-scale hydroelectric power and electricity did not begin to be developed until the formation of Grupo ICE.

=== Costa Rican Petroleum Refinery (RECOPE S.A.) ===
The Costa Rican Petroleum Refinery (Refinadora Costarricense de Petróleo, RECOPE in Spanish) is a state-owned institution, considered the biggest company in Central America. Since its creation in 1963 (and nationalized in 1974), RECOPE focuses its operations on import and distribution of fossil fuels in Costa Rica.

In the research field, RECOPE has an experimental plant of biodiesel and through internships and agreements, works with public universities of Costa Rica and research centers in the developing of alternative fuels like biofuels, natural gas and hydrogen.

==== Hydrogen research ====
In 2011, the board of directors of RECOPE signed a partnership with Ad Astra Rocket Company, an American rocket propulsion company with facilities in Costa Rica, to jointly research hydrogen technologies for the transport sector.

The project comprehends three phases: phase A (focused in the development of a feasibility study and to generate capacities for designing a station of compression and storage of hydrogen, delivered in 2012); phase B (designing and implementation of the storage system, delivered in 2013) and phase C (development of the integrated and autonomous system of energy supply from hydrogen).

The research work has been stranded since 2014, when the new administration of RECOPE decided to not continue with the initiative arguing doubts about the legal authority of RECOPE to invest in clean energy. In March 2015, the CEO of Ad Astra Rocket Company and former Costa Rican-American astronaut, Dr. Franklin Chang Diaz, announced the end of relations with RECOPE due their lack of definition and the delays the project was suffering. The announcement was followed by harsh criticism of the population and national media against RECOPE's board of directors as well as other governmental institutions involved in the decision.

=== ACOPE ===
Asociación Costarricense de Productores de Energía (ACOPE) was founded in 1989 and represents more than 40 private hydroelectric, wind, and biomass units generating in the country. Though there are a few large private energy companies in Costa Rica, most primarily generate power to sell to ICE.

=== Consorcio Nacional de Empresas de Electrificación de Costa Rica (CONELECTRICAS R.L.) ===
Consorcio Nacional de Empresas de Electrificacion de Costa Rica (Conelectricas), formed in 1989, is a union that aims to develop hydroelectric projects. The union consists of four smaller agencies: Coopeguanacaste, R.L, Coope Alfaro Ruiz, R.L, Coopelesca, R.L, and Coopesantos, R.L. Together, these four cooperatives provide electricity to around 500,000 people, or 22% of the country.

This consortium operates the San Lorenzo Hydroelectric Center and the Sigifredo Solís Solís Hydroelectric Center, both in San Ramón.

=== Costa Rican Association of Solar Energy (ACESOLAR) ===
The Asociación Costarricense de Energía Solar (ACESOLAR, in Spanish) is a NGO which its main objective is to promote the use and development of solar energy in the country. The organization collaborate with the private and public representatives related to the sector.

== 2017: 300 days of renewable energy ==
At the start of January 2017, Costa Rica's 4.9 million-person population ran entirely on renewable energy power for 75 days straight. This was a record-breaking achievement in that Costa Rica was the first nation to power itself completely clean of fossil fuels for this long a timeframe. This summer was an exceptionally rainy one for Costa Rica: while usually the dry season, the sheer amount of power provided from an unusually high amount of precipitation led to a higher than usual amount of hydroelectricity generated.

== Carbon neutrality ==
In 2007, the administration of former president of Costa Rica Oscar Arias Sánchez announced the national goal to become Costa Rica the second carbon neutral country in the world (first one was Bhutan) by 2021, the same year when the country will celebrate 200 years of independence from Spain. The proposal was officially presented to the United Nations Framework for Climate Change Convention (UNFCCC) in 2010. The initiative has been kept by the next administrations of President Laura Chinchilla Miranda and Luis Guillermo Solís Rivera and aims to evolve the national economy's carbon footprint to no more than 1 ton of CO_{2} emissions per capita.

Costa Rica aims to generate 100% carbon neutral electricity by 2021. Apart from relying 99% on renewable (low carbon) electricity, carbon neutrality is to be achieved by resort to electric and hybrid transportation. In addition, the Costa Rican government is also beginning to offset the country's carbon dioxide emissions with new budgeting, laws, and incentives, including measures to promote biofuels, hybrid vehicles, and clean energy. Another way of offsetting emissions will be a "C-Neutral" levy which will certify that ecotourism and other industrial practices are offsetting their carbon emissions. At $10 per one ton of carbon, the money will fund conservation, reforestation, and research.

The proposal requires the substitution of low emission technologies for fossil hydrocarbon (FHC) energy in the country and the transformation of the transport subsector – which represents 66% of national FHC emissions and 54% of the total CO_{2} emissions – into lower carbon footprint technologies such as electric vehicles, biofuels, hybrid cars and hydrogen vehicles, as well as the promotion among the population of greater reliance on the public transport system. 41% of the total CO_{2} emissions in the transport subsector come from particular vehicles, according to the government. These measures could allow the country to save between US$1.5 and $2 billion per year. In order to achieve the goal, Costa Rica also needs to improve its waste management practices and agriculture methods as these account for significant proportions of national GHG emissions.

In recent years, the private sector has been actively involved in adoption of energy efficiency policies and developing low carbon certification. The National Institute of Technical Norms of Costa Rica (INTECO, in Spanish) published the regulations that private companies should follow to get carbon neutral certification.

== Regulatory framework ==
The energy policy of the current administration is guided by the concept of energy sustainability with low emissions. The "VII Plan Nacional de Energía 2015-2030" was designed according to the priorities of the National Development Plan 2015-2018 and the government plan of President Luis Guillermo Solís Rivera.

The plan is based in five main objectives that are: 1) introducing changes in the National Power System for increasing energy efficiency, savings and improve the management of electricity demand; 2) encouraging the development of distributed generation and self-consumption electricity; 3) to update the law and institutional framework specialized in promoting energy efficiency; 4) to improve the calculation methods of electricity tariffs and 5) to raise the management efficiency of public entities of the electricity sector.

Regarding the transport sector, the national energy plan is also including as its main goals to promote "cleaner systems and clients of collective transport for hence mitigate the effects of global warming as well as encouraging the use of alternative fuels in the transport system, reducing the dependency of hydrocarbons, the emission of polluting gases and improve the regulations for importing new and used vehicles in order to promote energy efficiency and polluting reduction".

In addition, the National Development Plan of Costa Rica 2015-2018 establish the sectoral objectives for the energy policy: 1) "To promote actions facing global climate change through citizens' participation, technological change, innovation processes, research and knowledge for ensuring the welfare, human security and competitiveness of the country" and 2) "supply energy demand of the country using an energy matrix that ensure an optimal and continuous supply of electricity and fuels, promoting an efficient use of energy for keeping and improve the competitiveness of the country".

Utility private scale projects are regulated by the Law 7200 ("Ley que Autoriza la Generación Eléctrica Autónoma o Paralela", in Spanish), approved by the Legislative Assembly of Costa Rica in 1990. The private sector provides to Instituto Costarricense de Electricidad (ICE) nearly a quarter of the electricity generation capacity available and 10% of generated. However, there is still debate about how much private participation should be in the market.

By 2013, approximately 14.5% of the total generation in the country was provided by private companies and 23% of installed capacity in the National Power System, according with ICE. The Law 7200 establishes that ICE has two ways to buy private electric generation. In Chapter I it is defined the regimen of autonomous or parallel generation, that regulates the BOO (Build, Own and Operate) contracts. Article 7 of the law states that the "ICE will be able to declare eligible a project for the use of a plant of limited capacity, meanwhile the power, with the exception of parallel generation, doesn't represent more than 15% of the collective power of electric plants that constitutes the National Power System".

In Chapter II it is defined the competitive regimen that regulates the BOT (Build, Operate and Transfer) contracts. Article 20 allows the ICE to "buy electric energy from private companies up to an additional 15% of the limit specified in Article 7. This authorization is entitled for acquiring energy from hydro, geothermal, wind and any other non-conventional source, in bundles equal or smaller than 50,000 kW of maximum power (added by Law 7508 on May 9, 1995)". By 2014, ICE had 25 BOO contracts and 9 BOT contracts.

Despite political pressure to increase the participation of private companies and opening the market for reducing the costs of electricity, ICE is opposing the idea arguing their expansion plan is already solving the demand for 20 years ahead and the costs of the generation matrix are the lowest. According to ICE, until 2020 the country will need 850 MW of power generation, and all this demand is already considered with the current on-going projects.

Although the country has abundant renewable energy resources, more than 25% of Costa Rican territory has been entitled as natural protected land, reducing and limiting the possibility to explore and exploit these renewable sources, like geothermal energy in national parks.

In 2016, continuous discussions in the Legislative Assembly of Costa Rica have been occurring for a reform that would allow the ICE to exploit geothermal energy in protected areas. The Project 19.233 was presented by the former candidate to the Presidency of the Republic and incumbent Congress Representative, Ottón Solís from the Citizen Action Party. In turn, the ICE would compensate land used for the projects with land outside the parks. The bill addresses concerns over geothermal electricity generation in Rincón de la Vieja, Tenorio, and Arenal Volcano national parks. This initiative has raising concerns from some activists that claim the environmental controls led in the country by the National Technical Bureau of Environment (Secretaría Técnica Nacional del Ambiente, SETENA in Spanish) are weak. The activists also argue the process of exploration for geothermal energy is similar than those used in oil and mining.

However, in June 2015, the Minister of Environment and Energy, Edgar Gutierrez Espeleta, alleged MINAE is not currently planning to exploit geothermal energy in national parks and will postpone the decision until further research about its impact in the country and its biodiversity is made.

== Conflicts ==
=== Transportation ===
The biggest obstacle to carbon neutrality is the transportation sector. Vehicles consume 70% of the petroleum consumed in the nation, which is 40% of the total carbon emissions. The primary mode of public transportation is diesel-powered buses. More than 50% of Costa Rica's personal passenger cars are over 20 years old with high polluting engines, though the government is beginning to propose new hybrid and plug-in electric vehicle initiatives. The existing rail network is limited to the Central Valley and not electrified. Other proposed solutions include an upgrade of the rail network (including electrification), gondolas (Tiquisia 3S Gondola Mesetransporte), and trolleys in the metropolitan Costa Rican Central Valley.

=== Reliability ===
Though hydroelectricity from dams is a high-density and high-power energy source, it is also highly dependent on weather conditions. Hydropower is reliant on rainfall and is therefore not the most reliable form of energy during seasons of drought. After an extreme season of drought in 2014, Costa Rica was forced to resort to diesel generators since sufficient rainfall was unavailable to power any of the hydroelectric dams.

Solar is an energy source that is highly dependent on weather conditions and has therefore been used on a much smaller scale than hydroelectric, wind and geothermal energy.

=== Environmental and social impact ===
One main barrier to extensive geothermal power is the abundance of national parks and protected areas that prevent excavation near many of Costa Rican's volcanoes. For example, though Rincon de la Vieja has the potential to fuel a high density of geothermal energy, Costa Rican law currently prohibits the extraction of resources inside national parks in order to preserve the land. Hydroelectric dams have also been criticized for their effects on the surrounding ecosystems. Controversy around hydroelectric dam usage stems from both environmental impact on a surrounding region and from human displacement of land. Hydroelectric dams have been equated to interference in fish migration patterns, ecosystem disrupt, interference in water quality, and land degradation from flooding the land.

The Pirrís dam especially caused much controversy regarding the displacement of people who lived in the area, especially in relation to the indigenous peoples of Costa Rica. Though dams provide job opportunities for locals, they also displace large populations of humans.

==== Controversy with El Diquís Hydroelectric Project ====
The El Diquís Hydroelectric Project has been one of the most important projects for the Instituto Costarricense de Electricidad. It will be the biggest hydropower dam in the Central American region and it is designed to provide stability and reliability to the Costa Rican electricity generation grid. Diquís will produce 655 MW, for a total of 3050 MW. Its reservoir will extend over an area of approximately 7.407 ha (900 ha of it in indigenous protected lands) and its tunnel of 9 m diameter will be more than 11 km long. The project will require seven communities to move from the area - that's more than a thousand families. The project's total expected cost is around US$2 billion.

The size of the project and its impact on the local population have raised concerns throughout the years. Among the actions deployed by the activists against the project are lawsuits for environmental damages, protests and communication breaks with the government and Grupo ICE. The Diquís reservoir is projected to flood 10% of the China Kichá territory (104 ha) and 8% of Térraba land (726 ha).

Diquís is currently in the pre-investment phase but its impact on culture, the environment and life in general for the indigenous got the United Nations involved Committee on the Elimination of Racial Discrimination (CERD) as a key actor since 2011, after a letter was sent to it by representatives of the indigenous Térraba community. In their notification letter, CERD reminded Costa Rica of their obligations to consult and allow the participation of all indigenous communities affected by the project. Costa Rica replied to the U.N. to inform it of the status of the project and to highlight that construction has not been initiated yet.

In July 2015, a US$200 million lawsuit against ICE and the Government of Costa Rica was started by one of the associations representing the indigenous communities, alleging presumed environmental damage during the preliminary exploration works. It was dismissed by a court.

In October 2016, after a failed meeting with authorities of the Government of Costa Rica led by the Vice-minister of the Presidency Ana Gabriel Zuñiga, a group of indigenous representatives and local leaders confirmed their non-negotiable position against the project. The Government argued that they are currently working on a decree to facilitate the consultation process, which should be released by January 2017.

In November 2016, the Constitutional Court of Costa Rica declared unconstitutional Article 8 of the presidential decree that established that ICE is allowed to exploit materials for the dam, the powerhouse and collateral works in the areas where indigenous communities are located.

On 2 November 2018, ICE indefinitely suspended the Diquís project.

== See also ==
- List of power stations in Costa Rica
