= Miravalles (disambiguation) =

Miravalles Volcano is an andesitic stratovolcano in Costa Rica.

Miravalles may also refer to:

- Miravalles Jorge Manuel Dengo National Park, natural park in Costa Rica.
- Ugao-Miraballes
- Reynaldo Miravalles (1923–2016), Cuban actor
- Jenaro Quesada, 1st Marquis of Miravalles (1818–1889), Spanish soldier

== See also ==
- Miravalle (disambiguation)
