= List of strikes in Costa Rica =

Throughout the history of Costa Rica, a number of strikes, labour disputes, student strikes, hunger strikes, and other industrial actions have occurred.

== Background ==
A labour strike is a work stoppage caused by the mass refusal of employees to work. This can include wildcat strikes, which are done without union authorisation, and slowdown strikes, where workers reduce their productivity while still carrying out minimal working duties. It is usually a response to employee grievances, such as low pay or poor working conditions. Strikes can also occur to demonstrate solidarity with workers in other workplaces or pressure governments to change policies.

== 20th century ==
=== 1910s ===
- 1919 Costa Rican teachers' strike

=== 1930s ===
- 1934 Costa Rican banana strike

=== 1940s ===
- 1947 Huelga de Brazos Caídos, es, calling for electoral reform.

=== 1990s ===
- 1991 Costa Rican port strike

== 21st century ==
=== 2000s ===
- 2000 Costa Rican protests

=== 2010s ===
- 2014 Costa Rican port strike
- 2018 Costa Rican protests

== See also ==
- Trade unions in Costa Rica
