= Arenal Tempisque Conservation Area =

Costa Rican conservation area

- Área de Conservación Arenal Tempisque
- Location of the area, labeled ACAT in the northwest of the country.
- Location: Guanacaste Province, Puntarenas Province, Alajuela Province Costa Rica
- Coordinates: 10.385393°N 85.335887°W
- Governing body: National System of Conservation Areas (SINAC)
- Website: Arenal Tempisque Conservation Area

Arenal Tempisque Conservation Area (Spanish: Área de Conservación Arenal Tempisque (ACAT)), is an administrative area which is managed by SINAC for the purposes of conservation in the northwest part of Costa Rica, near the Arenal Volcano and covering part of the Cordillera de Tilarán and Cordillera de Guanacaste. It contains a number of National Parks, Wildlife refuges, and Protected Zones. The area was previously known as Arenal Tilarán Conservation Area.

== Protected areas ==
- Abangares River Basin Protected Zone
- Arenal-Monteverde Protected Zone
- Barbudal Hillocks Biological Reserve
- Cipancí Wildlife Refuge
- Madrigal Lake Wetland
- Miravalles Jorge Manuel Dengo National Park
- Miravalles Protected Zone
- Palo Verde National Park
- Taboga Forest Reserve
- Tenorio Protected Zone
- Tenorio Volcano National Park
- Zapandí Riverine Wetlands

== See also ==
- Arenal Huetar Norte Conservation Area, where Arenal Volcano National Park is managed.
- Curi Cancha Wildlife Refuge, a private wildlife refuge located near the area.
- Alberto Manuel Brenes Biological Reserve, previously managed in this area, now in Central Conservation Area
