= Presa Sangregado Dam =

Costa Rican hydroelectric dam

Coordinates: 10.475°N 84.761°W

Presa Sangregado Dam (also known as Arenal Dam and Sangregado Dam) is a high-earthen hydroelectric dam on the northeast shore of Lake Arenal in the Alajuela Province of northwest Costa Rica. The dam is 288 feet (88 m) in length and 184 feet (56 m) in height. The installed hydroelectric capacity is 157 megawatts. The hydroelectric power plant is operated by Instituto Costarricense de Electricidad.

== See also ==
- List of power stations in Costa Rica
