= Miraval =

Miraval may refer to:

- Raimon de Miraval, medieval troubador
- Miraval-Cabardes, French commune
- Studio Miraval, French recording studio
- Château Miraval, Correns-Var, French wine chateau
- Miraval, a luxury resorts and spas chain owned by Hyatt

== See also ==
- Miravalle (disambiguation)
