= Miravalles Jorge Manuel Dengo National Park =

Nature reserve in Costa Rica

- IUCN category II (national park)
- Miravalles Jorge Manuel Dengo National Park
- Location: Costa Rica
- Coordinates: 10°45′0″N 85°9′0″W
- Area: 43 square kilometres (17 sq mi)
- Established: 5 June 2019
- Governing body: National System of Conservation Areas (SINAC)
- Location in Costa Rica

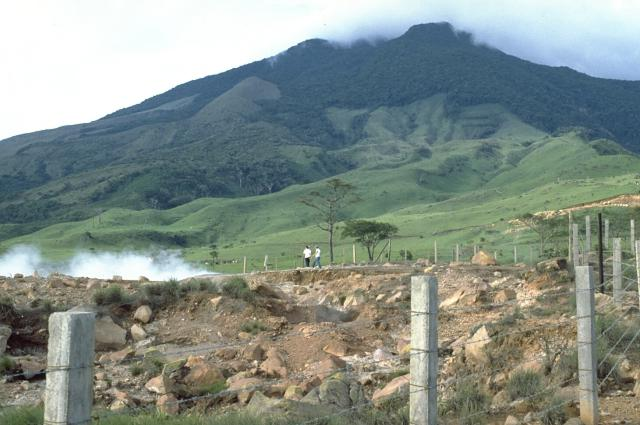
Miravalles volcano, located in the park

Miravalles Jorge Manuel Dengo National Park (Spanish: Parque Nacional Miravalles Jorge Manuel Dengo), is a national park and nature reserve in the northwest part of Costa Rica, which forms part of the Arenal Tempisque Conservation Area. The site contains the Miravalles Volcano, which is still active although the last recorded eruption was only of steam vents in 1946.

On 5 June 2019, it was created by allocating 43 square kilometres (17 sq mi) from Miravalles Protected Zone as declared by Executive Decree 41768-MINAE, it became the twenty ninth national park of Costa Rica.

== Economy ==
Nearby there is a geothermal energy plant which uses the large underground heated reservoir to provide electricity. In the same premises is also located the Miravalles Solar Park.
