= Arenal-Monteverde Protected Zone =

Protected area in Costa Rica

- Zona Protectora Arenal-Monteverde
- IUCN category VI (protected area with sustainable use of natural resources)
- Location within Costa Rica
- Location: Costa Rica
- Coordinates: 10.341°N 84.725°W
- Area: 283.34 square kilometres (109.40 sq mi)
- Established: 2 February 1977
- Governing body: National System of Conservation Areas (SINAC)

Arenal-Monteverde Protected Zone (Spanish: Zona Protectora Arenal-Monteverde), is a protected area in Costa Rica, managed under the Arenal Tempisque Conservation Area, it was created in 1977 by decree 6778-A.
