= Abangares River Basin Protected Zone =

Protected area in Costa Rica

- Zona Protectora Cuenca del Río Abangares
- IUCN category VI (protected area with sustainable use of natural resources)
- Location within Costa Rica
- Location: Costa Rica
- Coordinates: 10.3121°N 84.9009°W
- Area: 43.68 square kilometres (16.86 sq mi)
- Established: 25 August 1995
- Governing body: National System of Conservation Areas (SINAC)

Abangares River Basin Protected Zone (Spanish: Zona Protectora Cuenca del Río Abangares), is a protected area in Costa Rica, managed under the Arenal Tempisque Conservation Area, it was created in 1995 by decree 24539-MIRENEM.
