= Madrigal Lake Wetland =

Protected area in Costa Rica

- Humedal Laguna Madrigal
- Location within Costa Rica
- Location: Costa Rica
- Coordinates: 10.285°N 85.165°W
- Area: 0.47 square kilometres (0.18 sq mi)
- Established: 7 April 1994
- Governing body: National System of Conservation Areas (SINAC)

Madrigal Lake Wetland (Spanish: Humedal Laguna Madrigal), is a protected area in Costa Rica, managed under the Arenal Tempisque Conservation Area, it was created in 1994 by decree 23076-MIRENEM.
