= Taboga Forest Reserve =

Protected area in Costa Rica

- Reserva Forestal Taboga
- IUCN category VI (protected area with sustainable use of natural resources)
- Location within Costa Rica
- Location: Costa Rica
- Coordinates: 10.330°N 85.143°W
- Area: 2.97 square kilometres (1.15 sq mi)
- Established: 23 May 1978
- Governing body: National System of Conservation Areas (SINAC)

Taboga Forest Reserve (Spanish: Reserva Forestal Taboga), is a protected area in Costa Rica, managed under the Arenal Tempisque Conservation Area, it was created in 1978 by decree 8474-A.
