= Tenorio Protected Zone =

Protected area in Costa Rica

- Zona Protectora Tenorio
- IUCN category VI (protected area with sustainable use of natural resources)
- Location within Costa Rica
- Location: Costa Rica
- Coordinates: 10.605°N 84.958°W
- Area: 55.74 square kilometres (21.52 sq mi)
- Established: 16 March 1976
- Governing body: National System of Conservation Areas (SINAC)

Tenorio Protected Zone (Spanish: Zona Protectora Tenorio), is a protected area in Costa Rica, managed under the Arenal Tempisque Conservation Area, it was created in 1976 by decree 5836-A.
