= El Diquís Hydroelectric Project =

Coordinates: 9°04′56″N 83°17′44″W

The El Diquís Hydroelectric Project (known as the PHED for its Spanish acronym) is a cancelled hydroelectric dam project, designed by the Instituto Costarricense de Electricidad (ICE, the Costa Rican Electricity Institute).

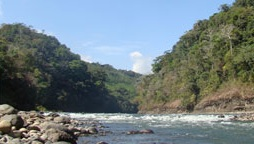
Possible construction site PH el Diquís

The dam was to be located on the Térraba River between Buenos Aires, Osa, and Pérez Zeledón in Puntarenas Province in southwestern Costa Rica. Planned as the largest hydroelectric dam in Central America, the 631 MW El Diquís Hydroelectric Project would have generated renewable electricity for more than one million consumers, dwarfing both the Reventazón Dam that opened in 2016 and the Pirrís hydroelectric plant, completed in 2011. The $2 billion PHED project would have required 7363.506 hectares of land, 915.59 hectares of which are indigenous territories, and displaced 1547 people. The population across the entire region is very sparse. There is almost no industry, employment opportunities is largely restricted to farms for coffee and pineapples, and some tourism. It would have employed in the region of 3,500 people and the electricity produced had the potential to be exported to neighbouring countries.

The PHED was suspended indefinitely by ICE on November 2, 2018. In the announcement, the executive president of ICE, Irene Cañas, cited financial issues as a primary reason for the decision and also announced a series of adjustments to improve the financial conditions of the entity. Previously, in November 2016, the Costa Rican Supreme Court ordered a moratorium on the PHED until ICE completed a consultation with local affected indigenous communities, which it had been stalling on since 2011.

The PHED was to be part of the PPP - Plan Puebla Panama, now known as The Mesoamerica Project, or in Spanish Proyecto Mesoamérica - via SIEPAC.

The dam's electrical operating plant was proposed to have been built at Palmar Norte, some distance from the dam itself. The project included two tunnels. Palmar Norte is a small village located in the Térraba Valley. The region now continues to be served by an old conventional electrical plant at this village.

== History ==
A previous version of this dam was under development for over 30 years, first called the Boruca Dam. The Boruca Dam would have included an aluminum smelting operation. ICE moved the project upstream to the west to the neighboring Térraba Indigenous Territory. Under the old proposal, the Diquís would be built on the General River rather than the Térraba River and would flood some of the Valle de General.

Representatives of some indigenous organizations were against the El Diquís Hydroelectric Project since its inception, stating that their rights have been disregarded. The project would have flooded approximately 685 hectares of their land, which might have forced members of the neighbouring Térraba community out of their homes. A student at the University of Texas School of Law's Human Rights Clinic wrote in an essay that the Costa Rican government had violated the rights of the indigenous people by failing to consult with them and keep them informed of project activities, in spite of international laws requiring them to do so.

In 2010, a former United Nations Special Rapporteur on the rights of Indigenous Peoples, James Anaya, recommended that ICE open a dialogue with affected indigenous communities.

In March 2011, the Teribe indigenous community filed a lawsuit against ICE, and in April 2011 the United Nations Organization also sent a letter to the Costa Rican government echoing the concerns of the Indigenous community. In October 2011, The Constitutional Chamber (Sala IV) of the Supreme Court of Costa Rica gave ICE a six-month deadline to consult with indigenous residents in the Térraba area based on recommendations by the United Nations.

In 2015 a coalition of anti-dam organisations submitted a document to the United Nations Committee on the Elimination of Racial Discrimination. These groups claimed that Costa Rica, having signed the International Labor Organization Convention 169 (Convention on Indigenous and Tribal Peoples), must respect Térraba indigenous lands and obtain free prior informed consent prior to construction.

== See also ==
- List of power stations in Costa Rica
