= 2000 Costa Rican protests =

Civil protest

The protests against the Energy Combo of Costa Rica were a series of demonstrations and popular protests held in Costa Rica as of March 20, 2000 after the approval in the first debate in the Legislative Assembly of the "Law for the Improvement of Public Services and Telecommunications and State Participation", also known as "Combo Energético" and popularly as "Combo ICE". This law was intended to allow competition in the telecommunications industry managed by Instituto Costarricense de Electricidad, and was supported by both major parties of the government.

ICE was popular among the general public of Costa Rica, and they saw the decision as privatizing the agency. Many were also worried about a major intrusion of foreign investment. The protests are considered a historic Costa Rican event for being one of the most significant social protests in recent times.

== See also ==
- 2018 Costa Rican protests
