= Lomas Barbudal Capuchin Monkey Project =

The Lomas Barbudal Capuchin Monkey Project is an ongoing field research project founded in 1990 by primatologist Susan E. Perry of UCLA. The project is dedicated to the study of the ecology, foraging behavior, and social behavior of the white-faced capuchin monkeys of the Lomas de Barbudal Biological Reserve in Guanacaste, Costa Rica.
