= Miravalles Protected Zone =

Nature reserve in Costa Rica

- Location within Costa Rica
- Location: Costa Rica
- Coordinates: 10°45′0″N 85°9′0″W
- Area: 73.72 square kilometres (28.46 sq mi)
- Established: 16 March 1976
- Governing body: National System of Conservation Areas (SINAC)

Miravalles Protected Zone (Spanish: Zona Protectora Miravalles) is a nature reserve in the northwest part of Costa Rica, which forms part of the Arenal Tempisque Conservation Area. The site contains the Miravalles Volcano, which is still active although the last recorded eruption was only of steam vents in 1946. The zone was created on 16 March 1976 by Executive Decree 5836-A.

On 5 June 2019, Miravalles Jorge Manuel Dengo National Park was created through allocating 43 square kilometres (17 sq mi) out of the original 116.72 square kilometres (45.07 sq mi) of this zone.
