= Lomas de Barbudal Biological Reserve =

Nature reserve of Costa Rica

Barbudal Hillocks Biological Reserve
- Reserva Biológica Lomas Barbudal
- IUCN category Ia (strict nature reserve)
- Location within Costa Rica
- Location: Costa Rica
- Nearest city: Bagaces, Guanacaste
- Coordinates: 10°30′37″N 85°22′28″W
- Area: 6,536 acres (26 km^{2})
- Established: 1986
- Governing body: National System of Conservation Areas (SINAC)

Barbudal Hillocks Biological Reserve (Spanish: Reserva Biológica Lomas Barbudal) is a nature reserve of Costa Rica, part of the Arenal Tempisque Conservation Area, that covers an area of 6,536 acres (26 km^{2}) in the Guanacaste Province, 15 kilometers southwest of Bagaces. The Barbudal hillocks are an ignimbritic plateaux which end in rocky cliffs that rise to 125 metres above the Tempisque River.

Many endangered deciduous trees such as ron-ron (Astronium graveolens), pochote (Pachira quinata) and cocobolo are found in the reserve, as well as over 250 different species of bees - comprising almost 25% of the world's bee species. The reserve is the site of a small museum called Casa Patrimonio, which has details of the fauna and flora of the reserve.

Barbudal hillocks are home to several groups of white-faced capuchin monkeys which, since 1990, have been the subject of the Lomas Barbudal Capuchin Monkey Project, an ongoing research project by primatologist Susan Perry of UCLA. As of January 2010 Mr. Manrique Montes Obando is the administrator of the reserve.
