= Toro River =

River in Costa Rica

Coordinates: 10°42′53″N 83°56′13″W

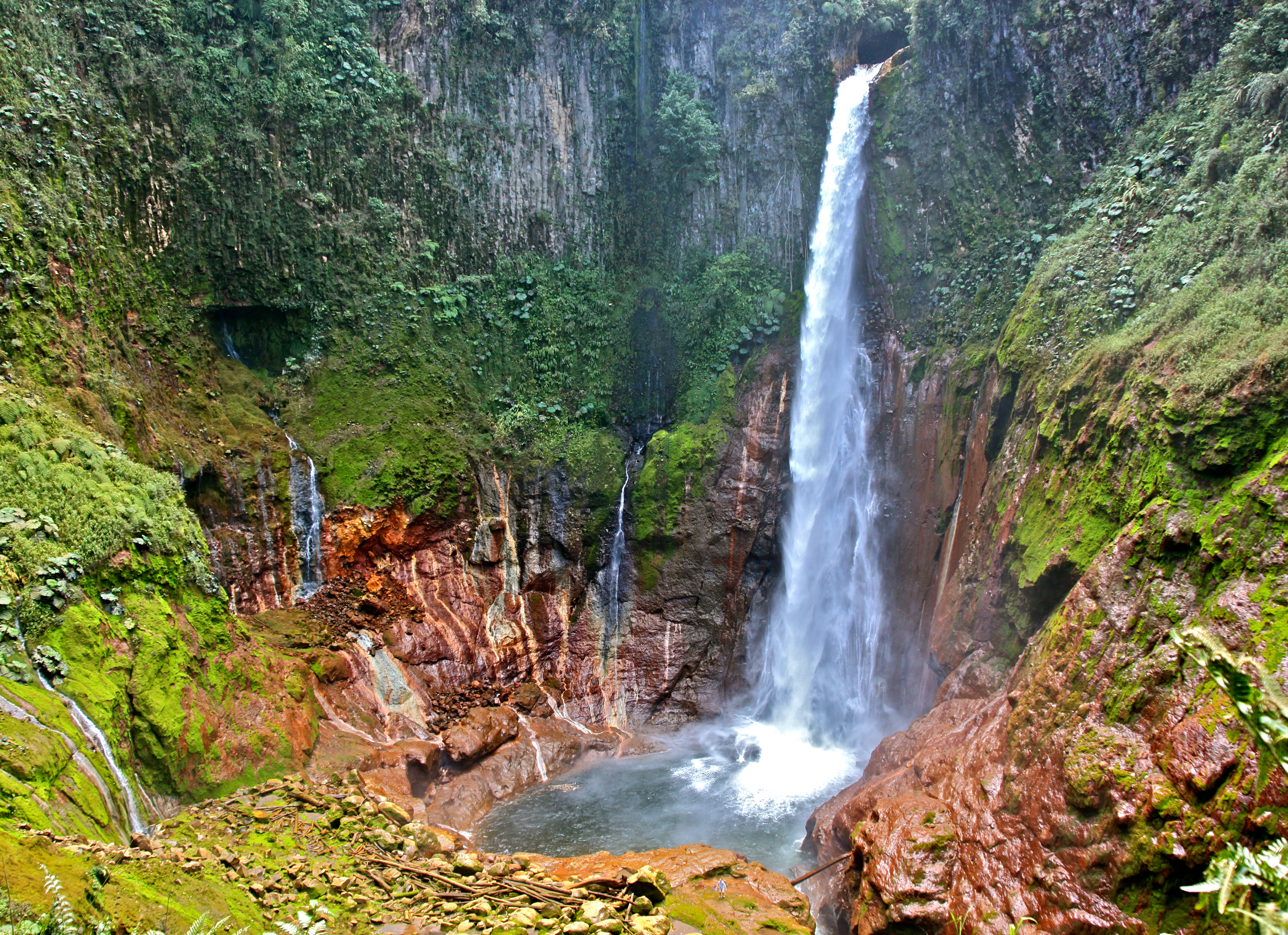
- The Toro waterfall on the Toro River

Location
- Country: Costa Rica

Physical characteristics
- Source: Near Catarata del Toro
  - location: Costa Rica
- Mouth
  - location: Costa Rica

Toro River is a river in Costa Rica.
