= Miravalle (disambiguation) =

Miravalle may refer to:

- The estate of the Spring Mountain Vineyard, California, USA
- Chapultepec Castle, known as Miravalle Castle during the Second Mexican Empire
- Count of Miravalle, Mexican noble title
- Hacienda San José de Miravalle, Mexico
- Mark Miravalle, a theologian

== See also ==
- Miravalles (disambiguation)
