= Miravalles Solar Park =

Solar energy project in Costa Rica

- Official name: Parque Solar Miravalles
- Country: Costa Rica
- Coordinates: 10.718467°N 85.179528°W
- Status: Operational
- Commission date: 2012-11-22
- Owner: Costa Rican Institute of Electricity
- Operator: Costa Rican Institute of Electricity

Solar farm
- Type: Flat-panel PV
- Collectors: 4300
- Site area: 0.027 square kilometres (0.010 sq mi)

Power generation
- Nameplate capacity: 1.0105 MW

Miravalles Solar Park, (Spanish: Parque Solar Miravalles) is a solar energy project located in Guanacaste Province of Costa Rica, near the Miravalles Volcano. It is operated by the Costa Rican Institute of Electricity (ICE).

It has 4300 solar panels, with an individual output of 235 W, for a combined peak total of 1.0105 MW.

At the time of its inauguration, it was the largest solar power plant in Central America. It was constructed with funds donated by the Japan International Cooperation Agency.
