= Curi Cancha Wildlife Reserve =

Privately-owned wildlife refuge in Costa Rica

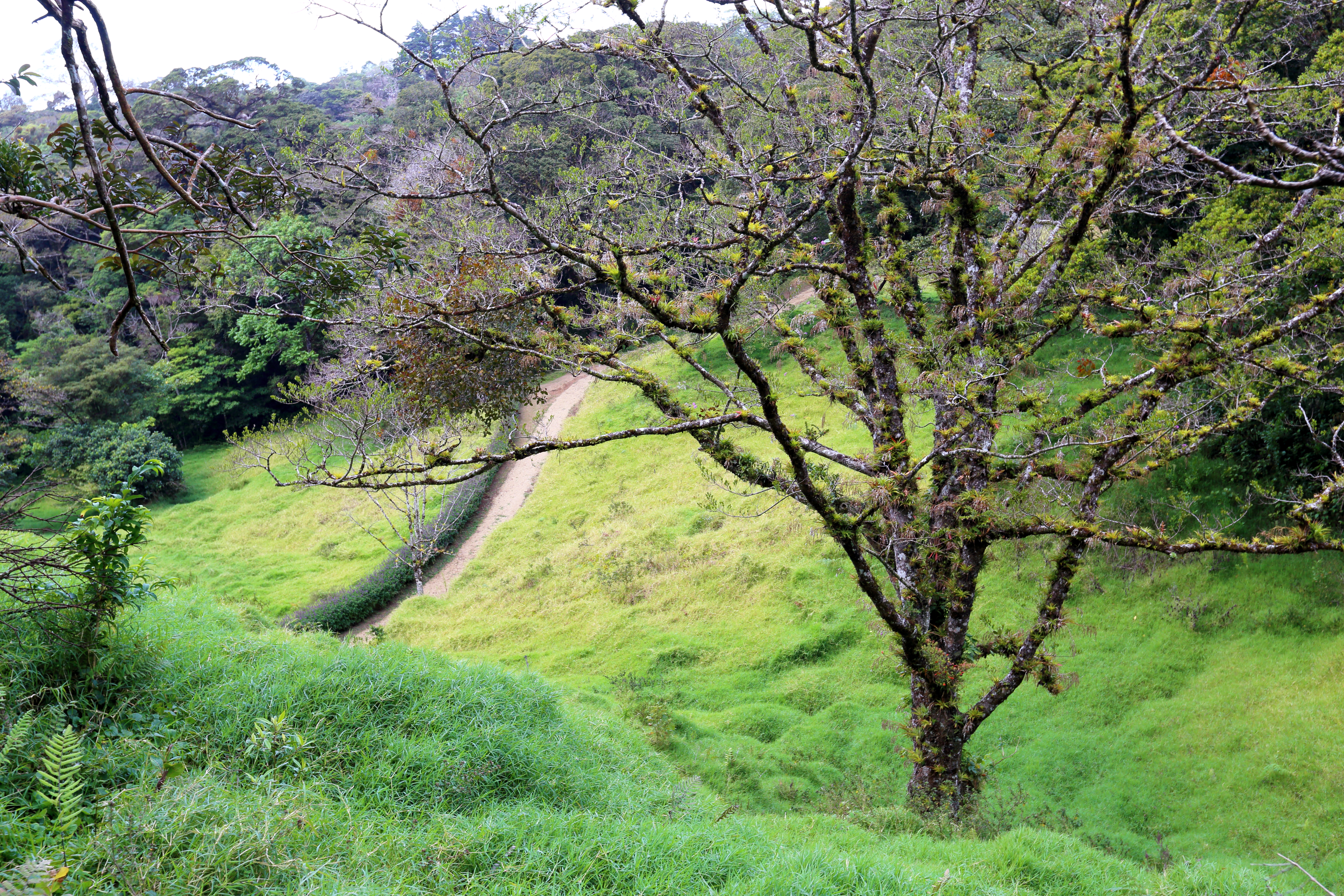
- A clearing in the reserve

- Location within Costa Rica
- Location: Puntarenas, Costa Rica
- Coordinates: 10.3064°N 84.802°W
- Area: 187 acres (0.76 km^{2})
- Established: 1997
- Governing body: National System of Conservation Areas (SINAC)

Curi Cancha Wildlife Reserve is a private wildlife Reserve in the central part of Costa Rica, and protects cloud forest in the Cordillera de Tilarán near Juntas.

The Reserve entrance is about a kilometer before the famous Monteverde Cloud Forest Reserve. The lower portion is drier, with few epiphytes, but the upper portion is cloud forest. While the forest is not quite so pristine as Monteverde, the most spectacular birds are much easier to see. The reserve is particularly good for the resplendent quetzal, the most sought-after bird of the cloud forest. The reserve is also a good place to find keel-billed toucan, Lesson's motmot, collared trogon, and three-toed sloth, as well as monkeys.

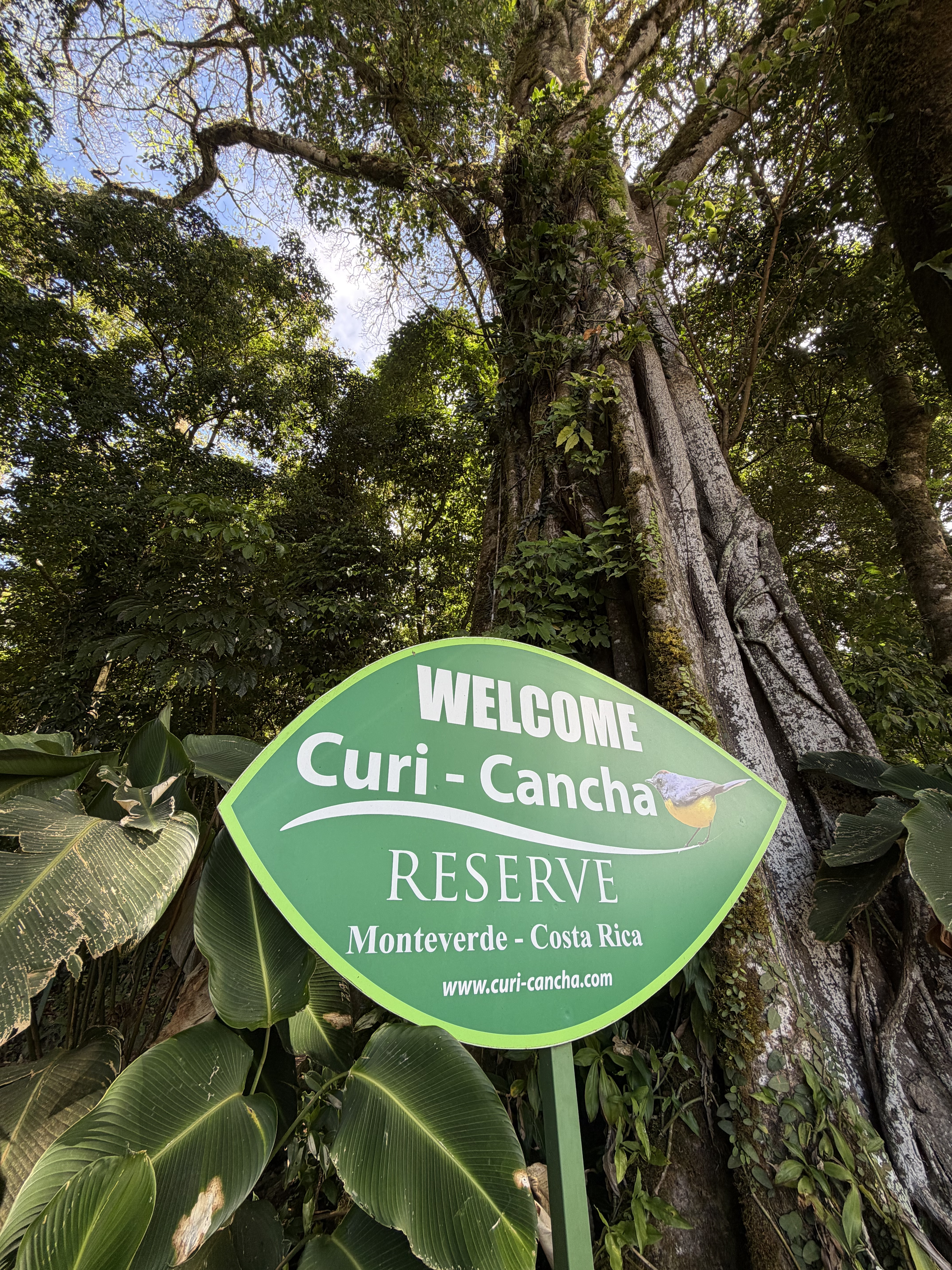
The welcome sign at Curi-Cancha in front of a large ficus tree.

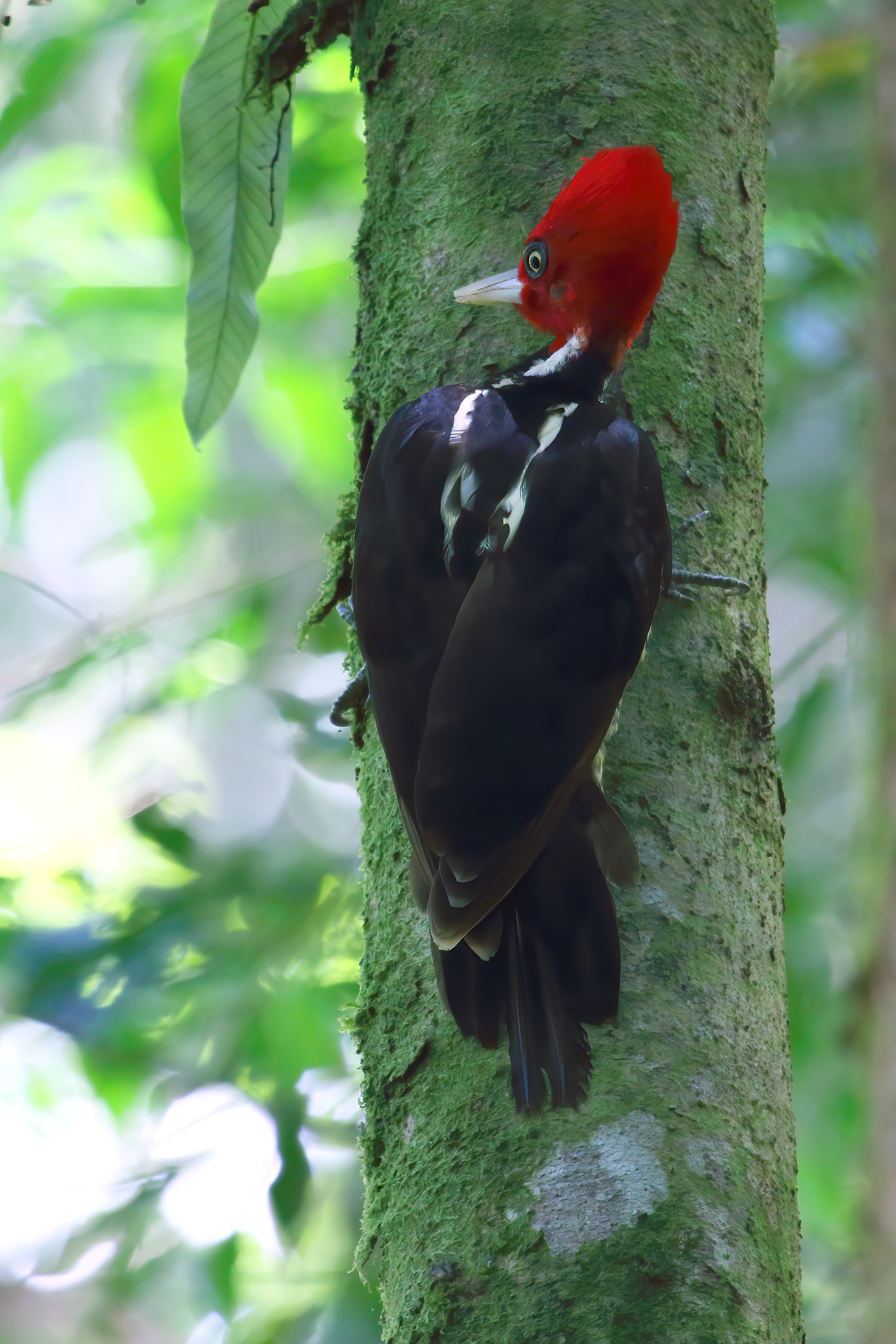
Pale-billed woodpecker along Morpho trail

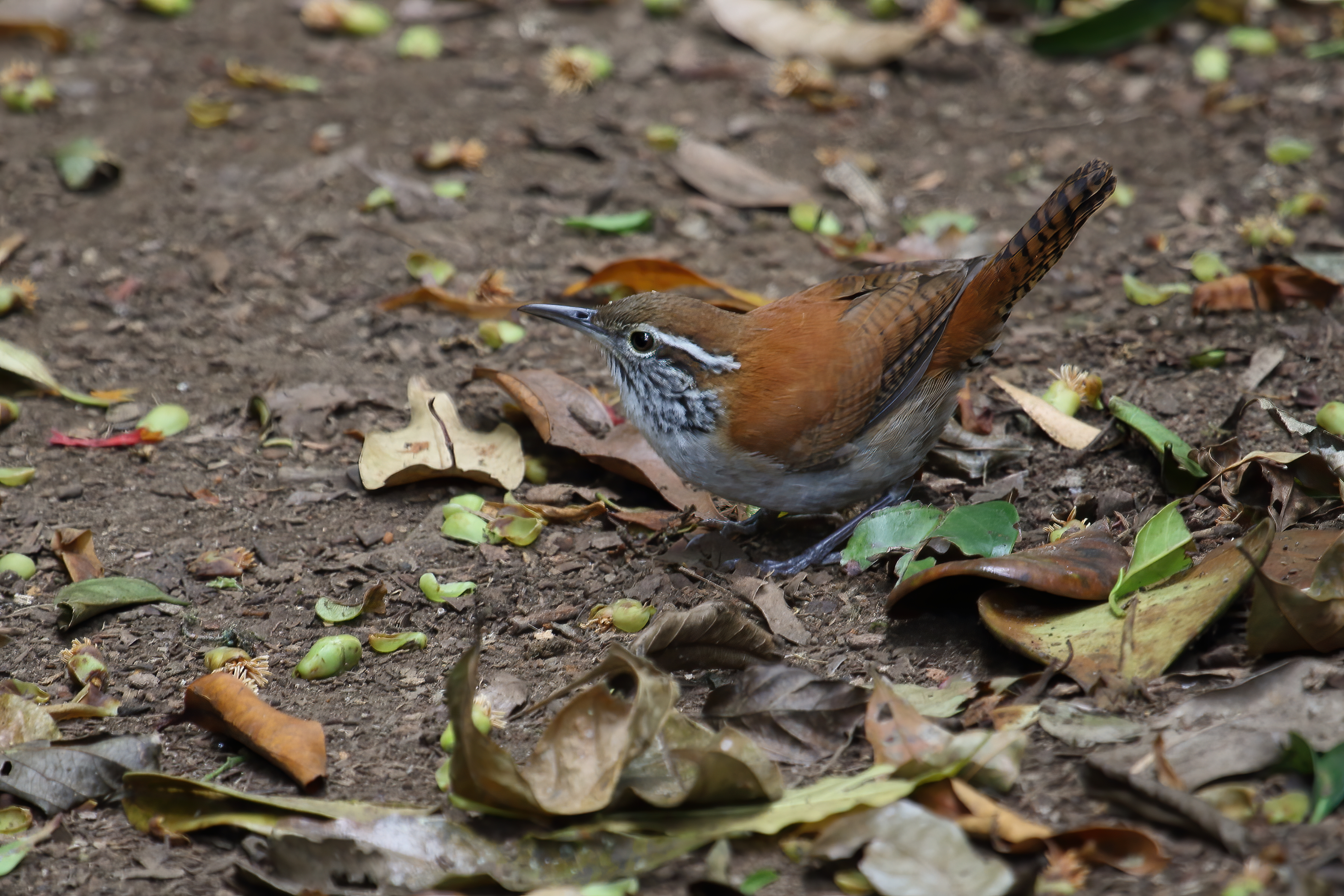
Rufous-and-white wren at the junction of Guacharo and Ficus trails

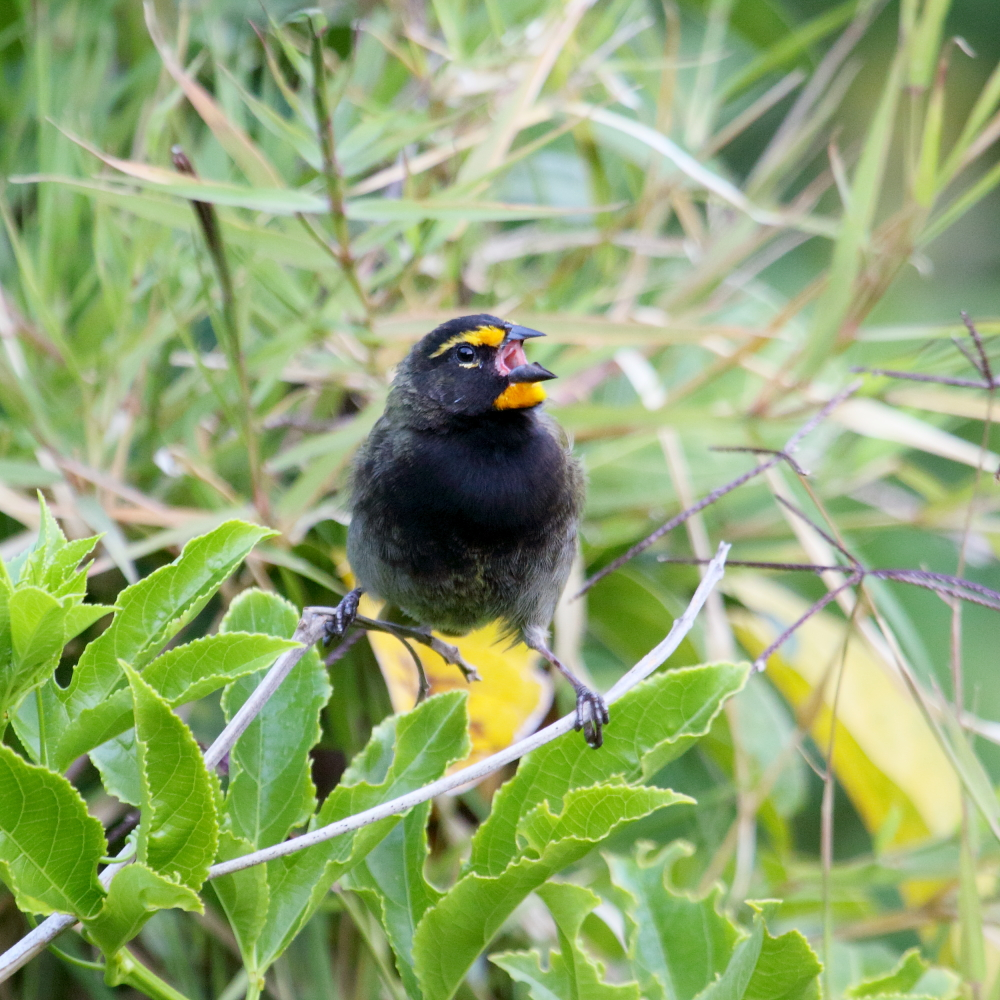
Yellow-faced grassquit in the parking lot

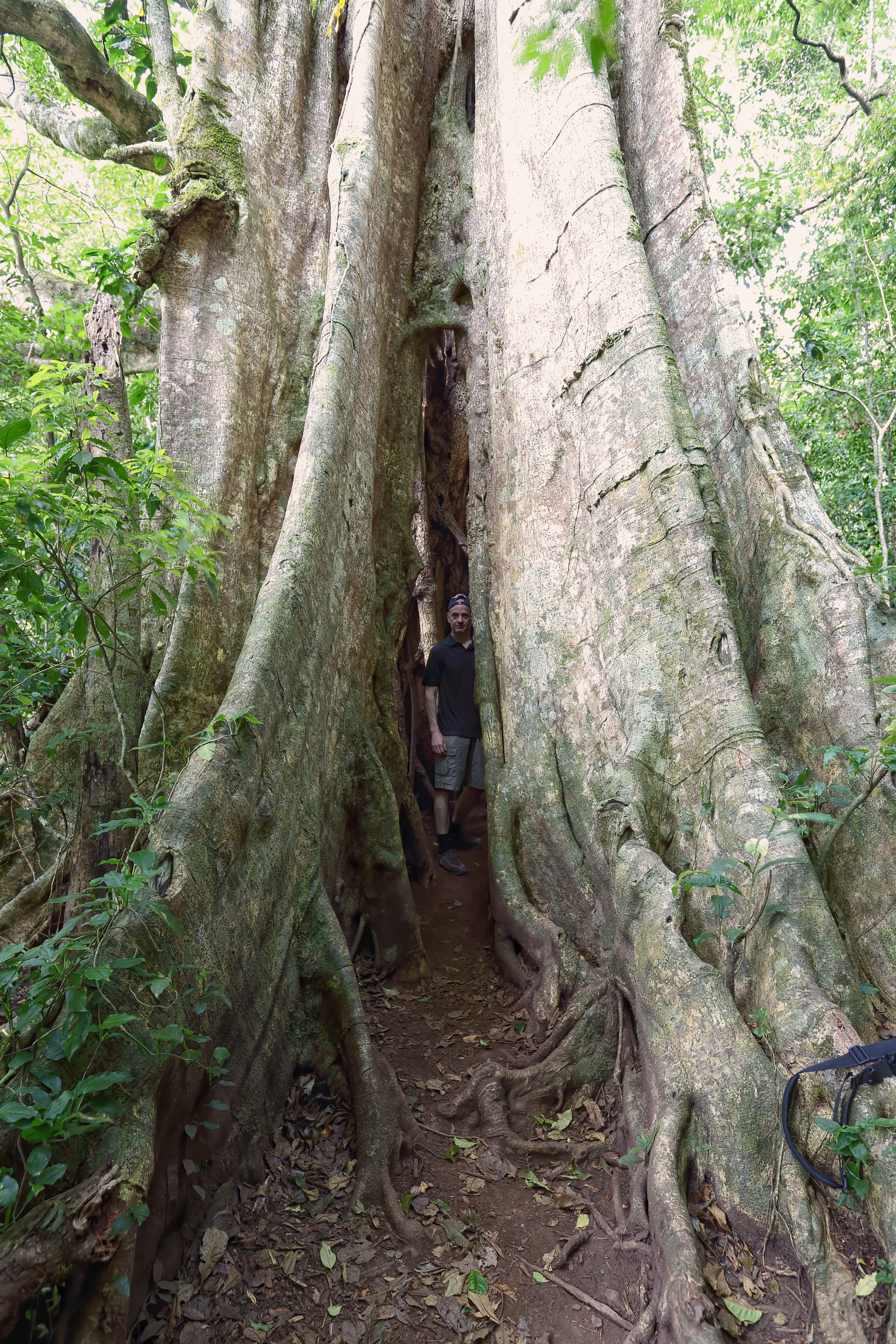
A strangler fig in the reserve
