= Los Santos Wind Farm =

Onshore wind farm in Costa Rica

- Official name: Parque Eólico Los Santos
- Country: Costa Rica
- Coordinates: 9.777102°N 83.995826°W
- Status: Operational
- Commission date: 2011
- Owner: Coopesantos
- Operator: Coopesantos

Wind farm
- Type: Onshore
- Hub height: 44 metres (144 ft)
- Rated wind speed: 10 metres per second (32.8 ft/s)
- Site area: 0.46 square kilometres (0.18 sq mi)

Power generation
- Nameplate capacity: 12.75 MW

External links
- Website: Parque Eólico Los Santos

Los Santos Wind Farm, (Spanish: Parque Eólico Los Santos) is a wind energy project located in Los Santos region of Costa Rica, alongside the Inter-American Highway (Route 2). It is operated by the local public utilities cooperative, Coopesantos, and generates 30% of their distributed energy.

It has 15 wind turbines, at a height of 44 meters each, with an individual output of 0.85 MW, for a combined total of 12.75MW.
