= Sigifredo Solís Solís Hydroelectric Center =

Hydroelectric power center in Costa Rica

- Location within Costa Rica
- Location: San Ramón, Alajuela province, Costa Rica
- Coordinates: 10.365099°N 84.629682°W
- Purpose: Power
- Status: Operational
- Owner: CONELECTRICAS R.L.
- Operator: CONELECTRICAS R.L.

Dam and spillways
- Type of dam: Concrete
- Impounds: Peñas Blancas River
- Dam volume: 127,000 m^{3} (166,000 cu yd)

Power Station
- Turbines: 2× 12 MW; 1× 2 MW
- Installed capacity: 26 MW

Sigifredo Solís Solís Hydroelectric Center is a hydroelectric power project located in San Ramón, Alajuela province, Costa Rica. It is operated by CONELECTRICAS R.L., a consortium of power utilities companies in the north of the country.

== History ==
The project was created under the Law 8345, for the electrification of rural areas in the country. The project name is Proyecto Hidroeléctrico Pocosol – Agua Gata.

== Operation ==
=== Hydroelectric centers ===
There are two small dams with their own power plants in the project, Pocosol and Agua Gata.

Pocosol is 7 m (23 ft) high and 50 m (160 ft) wide. The canal to the power station is 3.6 km (2.2 mi) long for 19.5 m^{3}/s (690 cu ft/s) flow. There are two 12MW generators.

Agua Gata is 5 m (16 ft) high and 30 m (98 ft) wide. The canal is 1.902 km (1.182 mi) long for a 3.1 m^{3}/s (110 cu ft/s) flow. There is one 2MW generator.
