= Miravalles Volcano =

Volcano in Costa Rica

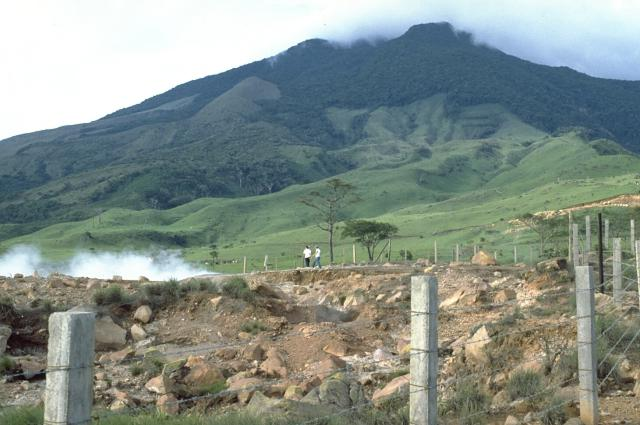
- Miravalles Volcano in 1988

Highest point
- Elevation: 2,028 m (6,654 ft)
- Listing: List of volcanoes in Costa Rica
- Coordinates: 10°44′54″N 85°09′10″W

Geography
- Location within Costa Rica
- Location: Costa Rica
- Parent range: Cordillera de Guanacaste

Geology
- Rock age: 1.5 Myr
- Mountain type: Stratovolcano
- Volcanic arc: Central America Volcanic Arc
- Last eruption: September 1946

The Miravalles Volcano is an andesitic stratovolcano within the Miravalles Protected Zone, a nature reserve in Costa Rica. The Miravalles Volcano reaches an elevation of 2,028 metres (6,654 ft) and is the tallest volcano in the Cordillera de Guanacaste mountain range. It is the site of the most developed and productive geothermal field in Costa Rica, with a plant capable of generating 161.5 or 162.7 MW of power.

== Geology ==
Miravalles is one of five post-caldera cones within the 15-by-20-kilometre (9.3 by 12.4 mi) Guayapo caldera, the latter formed between about 1.5 and 0.6 million years ago. There are two andistic lava flows on its northern flank, one descending west towards a geothermal power plant (see section below), the other to the north into the Guayapo caldera. Lava flows also cover the western and southwestern flanks of the Miravalles complex. There are parasitic cones near the crater at altitudes of 5,098 feet (1,554 m), 5,059 feet (1,542 m) and 3,280 feet (1,000 m). Twin cones named Cerro la Giganta stand at 4,888 feet (1,490 m). On the southern face, there are three small cones, among them Gota de Agua at 3,550 feet (1,080 m) and Espiritu Santo at 3,212 feet (979 m).

The only reported historical eruptive activities are a small steam explosion on the south-western flank in 1946 and an eruption c. 5050 BCE.

== Geothermal power generation ==
In response to the 1973 and 1979 oil crises, Costa Rica, with little in the way of fossil fuel resources, began considering alternative energy sources. The Instituto Costarricense de Electricidad (Costa Rican Institute of Electricity, ICE) conducted an evaluation of the country's geothermal resources between November 1987 and October 1988; Miravalles was selected as one of three high-priority areas. Three deep exploratory wells were dug from 1979 to 1980; they all indicated that there was a "liquid-dominated reservoir" covering 15 square kilometres (5.8 sq mi) under the volcano's southwestern slope. Six more wells were dug between 1984 to 1986, followed by 20 more.

A hybrid power plant was constructed and commissioned in March 1994, with a capacity of 161.5 or 162.7 megawatts. There are five power plants in four powerhouses, 48.5 kilometres (30.1 mi) of pipelines and a total of 61 wells, consisting of production, injection and observation wells. A 50-kilometre (31 mi) power line connects it to the main electrical transmission line. It is the most developed and productive geothermal field in the country, though it has reached its extraction rate ceiling. It is owned by ICE.
