= 2018 Costa Rican protests =

2018 protests in Costa Rica
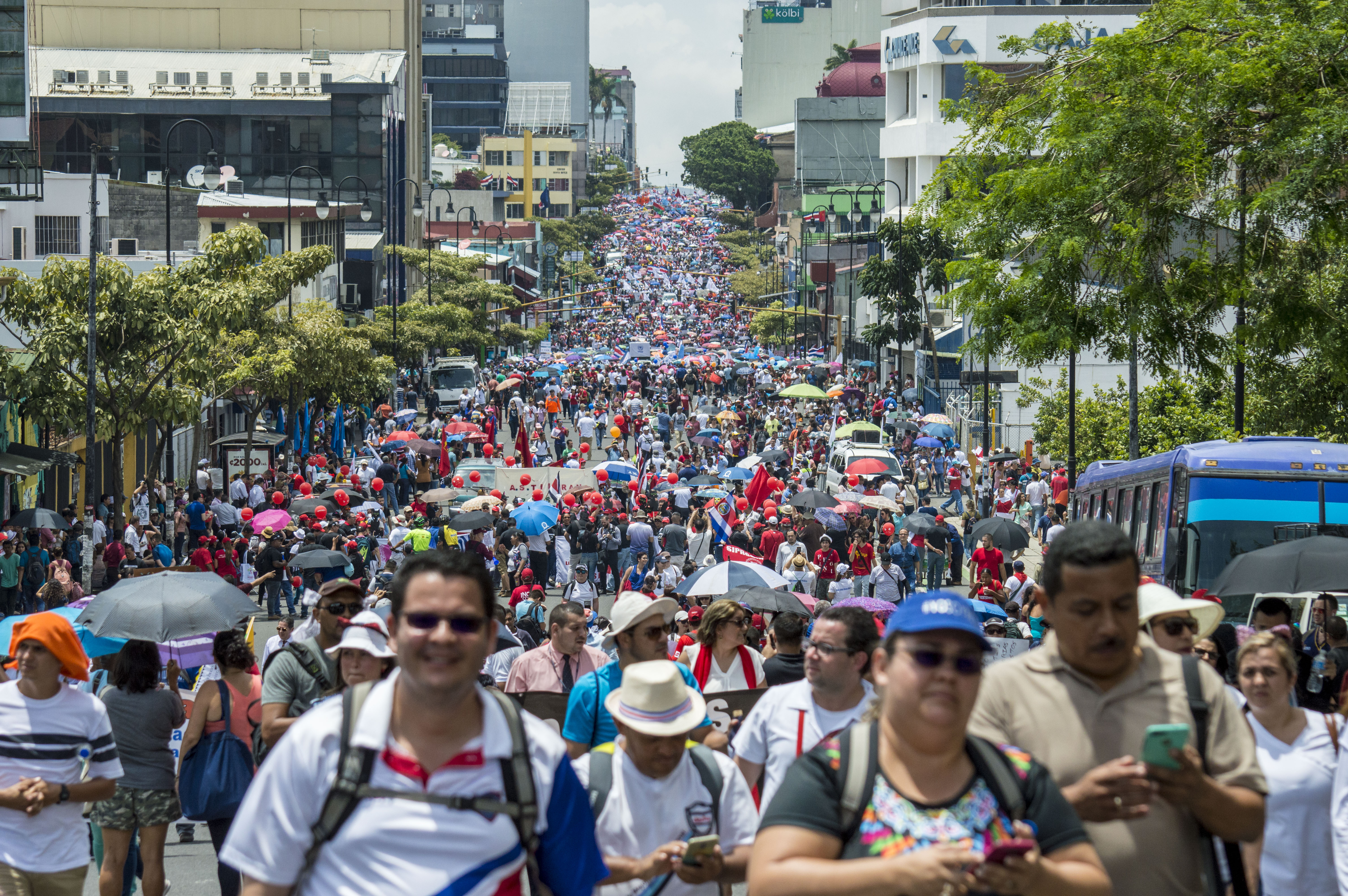
- Mass rallies and demonstrations in Costa Rica
- Date: September 10, 2018 – December 11, 2018
- Location: Costa Rica
- Caused by: New tax reform bill
- Goals: Repeal of tax reform bill; Fresh elections
- Methods: Demonstrations
- Result: Protests suppressed by force

The 2018 protests in Costa Rica was a civil conflict that took place in the Central-American country of Costa Rica for 93 days, after the trade unions went on an indefinite strike against the tax reform bill promoted by the Executive Branch in the Assembly Legislative.

== Protests ==
The protest movement started on September 10, 2018 and culminated on December 11 of that same year, when the unions of the Supreme Court, the only ones still on strike, abandoned their protest.

The extent of the strike caused severe effects on the provision of services in medical centers, schools, colleges, universities, fuel distribution, trials, hearings and other judicial processes and interrupted the passage through important national routes.

The strike was constituted as the longest social conflict in the history of Costa Rica, surpassing the general strike of the year 2000 against the "Combo del ICE". The magnitude and duration of the movement produced a contraction in the growth of the country's nominal GDP of 0.4 percentage points, generated 13 8billion colones in losses and sparked a national debate on the scope and limitations of the right to strike, because The courts of justice took considerable time to issue the sentences that qualified as legal or illegal the different protests in the different state institutions.

The strikes also recorded acts of violence, clashes between police and strikers, attacks on infrastructure and state buildings, including the Costa Rican Oil Refinery and the Ministry of Finance, as well as an attack on the President of the Republic, Carlos Alvarado Quesada, in the middle of a public highway.

== See also ==
- 2018 Nicaraguan protests
