= Instituto Costarricense de Electricidad =

Costa Rican telecommunication and electricity corporation

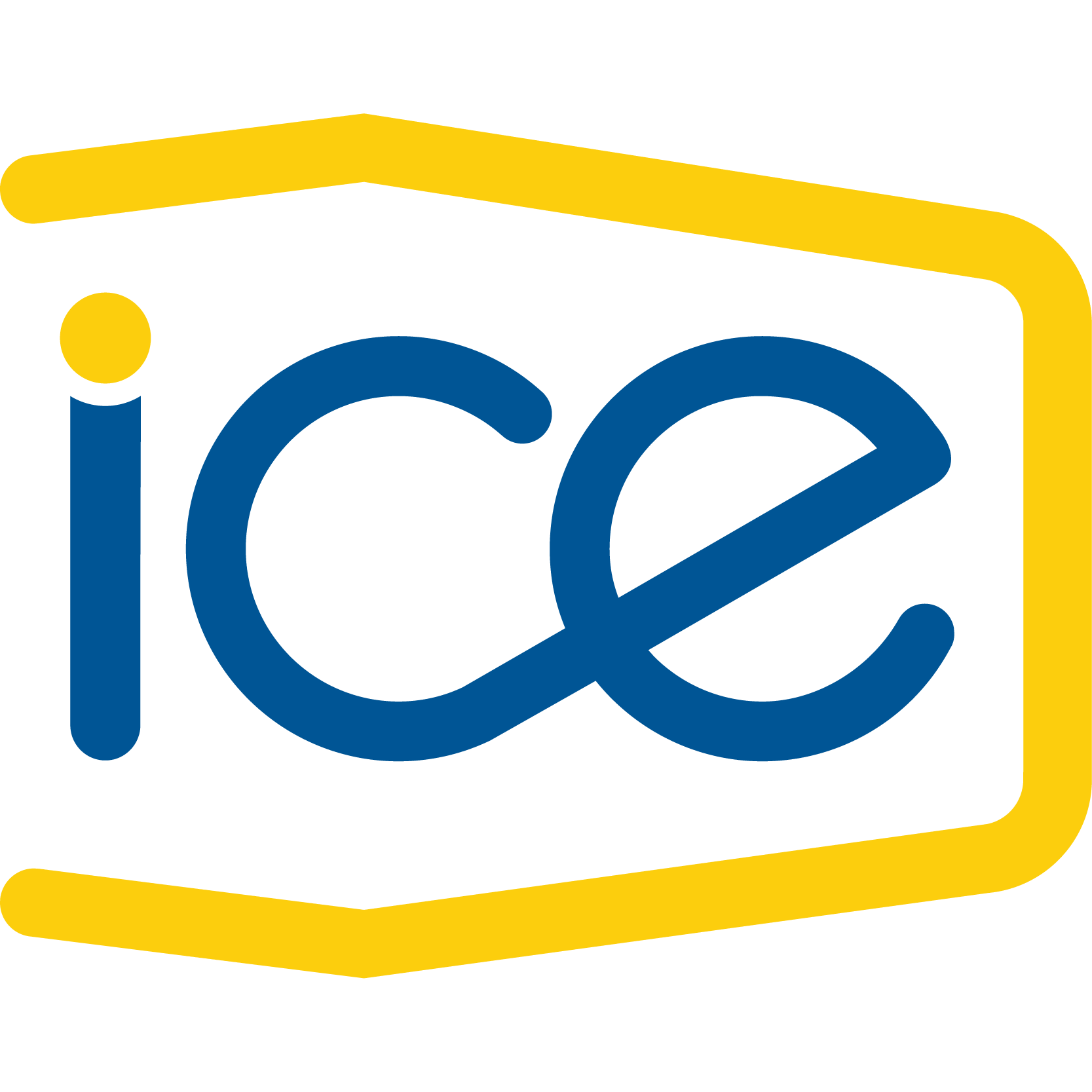
- Type: Public
- Industry: Electricity, telecommunication
- Founded: San José, Costa Rica (April 8, 1949)
- Headquarters: San José, Costa Rica
- Key people: Teófilo de la Torre (Chief executive officer)
- Services: Electrical grid; Mobile telephony; Internet
- Revenue: $ 1,844 million
- Website: link

ICE Building in Sabana Norte, San José

Instituto Costarricense de Electricidad (English: Costa Rican Institute of Electricity) (ICE) is the Costa Rican government-run group composed of the national electricity provider (Compañía Nacional de Fuerza y Luz - CNFL) and telecommunications services provider (Radiographic Costarricense SA - RACSA).

== History ==
ICE was founded on 8 April 1949 by Decree-Law No. 449, after the Costa Rican Civil War of 1948, in order to solve the problems of power shortages that occurred in Costa Rica in the 1940s. Since 1963, ICE provides telecommunications services throughout the country.

The attempts to reform ICE throughout a set of laws in the years 1999 and 2000 generated a great social mobilization, including the 2000 Costa Rican protests. The ruling party at that time, the Social Christian Unity Party, and the main opposition, National Liberation Party, agreed to change the institution. Meanwhile, the citizen opposition reached 274 protests in 14 days.

Following the Dominican Republic–Central America Free Trade Agreement, the telecommunication market was opened to private companies. Since 2011, América Móvil through Claro Americas and Telefónica through Movistar, are competing against ICE in the Costa Rican mobile market. From 2006 to 2013, ICE invested $1.7 billion in the development of renewable energy solutions.

In 2018, ICE launched telecommunications services in Nicaragua (Te-Comunica), and announced its ambitions for further regional development. In 2021, ICE Group generated an annual operating income of around $2.194 billion.

== Description ==
ICE is a member of the International Hydropower Association since 2019.
