= Santa Bárbara de Heredia =

District in Santa Bárbara canton, Heredia province, Costa Rica

Santa Bárbara
- District
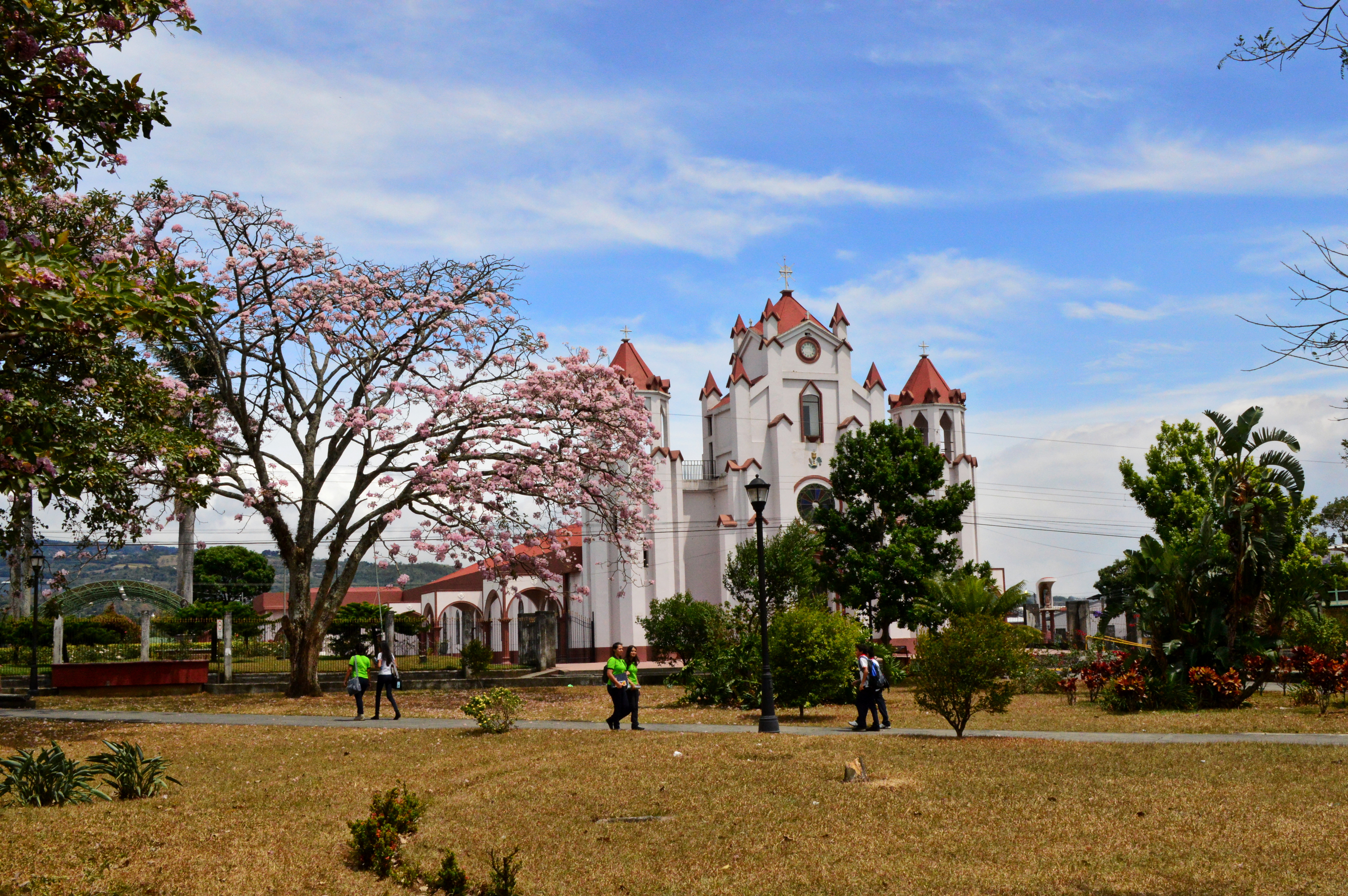
- Santa Bárbara Plaza and Cathedral
- Santa Bárbara district
- Santa Bárbara district location in Costa Rica
- Coordinates: 10.0383687°N 84.1589162°W
- Country: Costa Rica
- Province: Heredia
- Canton: Santa Bárbara
- Creation: 1889

Area
  - Total: 1.27 km^{2} (0.49 sq mi)
- Elevation: 1,140 m (3,740 ft)

Population (2011)
  - Total: 5,944
  - Density: 4,680/km^{2} (12,100/sq mi)
- Demonym: Bárbeño
- Time zone: UTC−06:00
- Postal code: 40401
- Climate: Am

Santa Bárbara is one of the six districts that make up the canton of Santa Bárbara, Costa Rica. The district of Santa Bárbara is commonly referred to as Santa Bárbara de Heredia, and is the seat of the municipality of Santa Bárbara, and therefore awarded the title of city. It is an important commercial and transportation hub, approximately seven miles from the provincial capital of Heredia and five miles from the provincial capital of Alajuela.

== History ==
Before the Spanish settlers came, Santa Bárbara was originally occupied by the Huetares, an indigenous tribe. The Huetare King, Cacique Garabito, dominated the area. When the Spanish arrived, they originally called the area Churruca or Surruco. Heredia, Barva, and Alajuela, three neighboring cities, were populated and settled in the late 1700s. As trade increased between the three cities, Santa Bárbara developed as a waypoint. Though still commonly referred to as Churruca or Surruco, the name for the municipality and canton of Santa Bárbara was first mentioned in documents from 1821.

The area of the current plaza in Santa Bárbara was the approximate center of the four districts in the region and a small hermitage was built there in 1837. By 1846, 1,500 people lived with the Santa Bárbara canton. With a priest visiting every Sunday, San Pedro de Santa Bárbara resident Pedro Saborío suggested the construction of a Catholic church near the current plaza in 1852. In 1859, Monseñor Joaquín Anselmo Llorente y Lafuente, the bishop of San José, began construction of a cathedral in its current location.

The district of Santa Bárbara was officially formed in December 1848 as a church parish, recognized by the national government. In 1855, Florentino Cortés became the first mayor of the district. In September 1889, the city of Santa Bárbara was officially founded. It was first classified as a villa, but became a city as the population grew.

Santa Bárbara's first public school opened in 1860 with cobbler Tomás Redondo giving the first lessons. The first official teacher was Diego Trejos.

In 1896, the first electric lighting arrived in the district. A hydroelectric plant was built along the Porrosatí River, on the border of the districts of Santa Bárbara and San Juan in 1914. In 1911, running water pipes were installed in Santa Bárbara.

== Economy and politics ==
As the center of commerce for the canton, there are many commercial businesses in the municipality. Larger businesses include a supermarket and appliance store. Several banks are within a few blocks of Santa Bárbara's central plaza, including Banco Popular, Grupo Mutual Alajuela, and Banco Nacional.

The municipality of Santa Bárbara is considered a bedroom community. Most residents go to Alajuela, Heredia, Belén and San José for work.

Among other goals, in 2010 the Santa Bárbara canton planned to shore up Santa Bárbara 's infrastructure. There are plans to improve the district's agricultural market, located two blocks north of the central plaza. There are also plans to create a "Casa de Arte y Cultura" (House of Art and Culture).

In 2013, the city council called on Mayor Melvin Alfaro Salas to step down. Citing problems with water distribution, "unacceptable" labor practices, poor budgeting, and failure to attend council meetings, each member of the council asked for Alfaro Salas' resignation. Alfaro Salas did not resign. In 2014, municipal workers went on strike Albino Vargas, president of the Asociación Nacional de Empleados Públicos (National Association of Public Employees) joined the strike, saying that workers had been abandoned by Alfaro Salas, a charge he denied.

== Culture ==
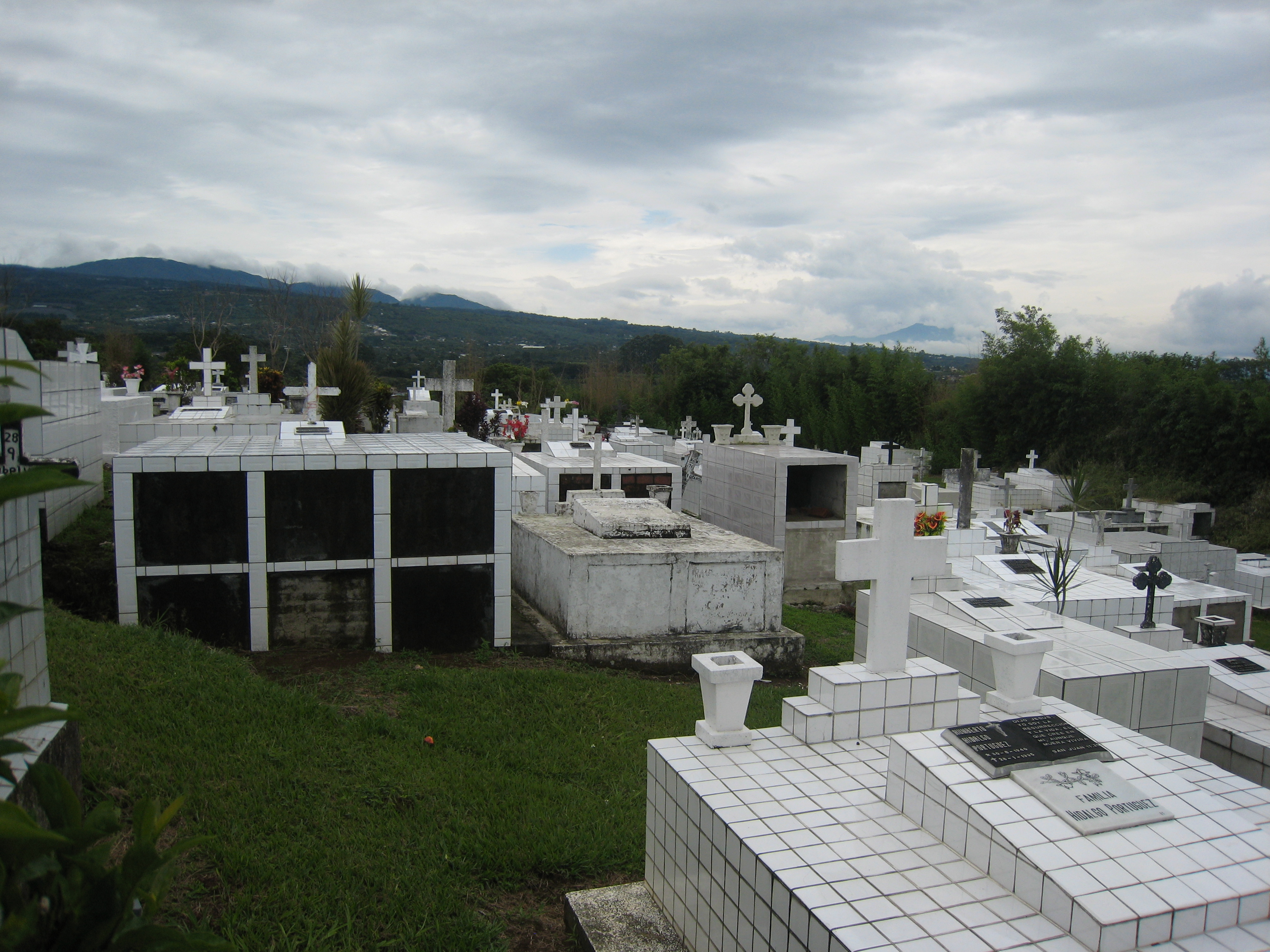
Santa Bárbara de Heredia Cemetery

There is a chapter of the Consejo de la Persona Joven (Council of Young People) in Santa Bárbara. The Council of Young People organizes activities and groups, such as the United Canton Band.

The municipality maintains two cemeteries. The cemetery on the western outskirts contain both tombs and burial plots. Many of the tombs have neo-classical monuments.

A popular attraction near the town is Ark Herb Farm, a botanical garden with a focus on medicinal herbs.

== Education ==
The elementary school in the municipality of Santa Bárbara is named after former head of state Juan Mora Fernández. It was built in 1951 on the west side of the plaza. The high school, Liceo de Santa Bárbara, was established in 1973 using the facilities at Juan Mora Fernández, but it later moved to a location 800 meters from the central plaza.

The library in Santa Bárbara opened in 1981. Due to budgetary reasons, it closed in 1995, but reopened in 2001 in the Salón Comunal.

== Sports ==
=== Volleyball ===
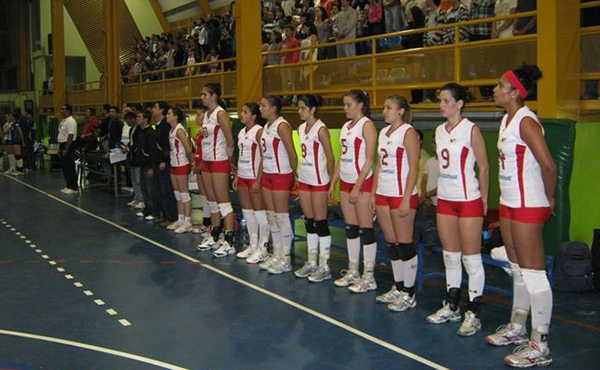
Santa Bárbara Volleyball Sports Association (ASBAVOL), 2011, before game against Universidad de Costa Rica

The municipality is also home to the Asociación Deportiva Barbareña de Voleibol (ASBAVOL) (Santa Bárbara Volleyball Sports Association), one of the country's most successful volleyball clubs. ASBAVOL was started in 1992 by former soccer player Julio Alfaro. Since 2005, ASBAVOL's first division association team has won the national championship five times (2005, 2007, 2008, 2009, and 2010), as well as eight gold medals in the Juegos Deportivos Nacionales (National Sporting Championship) (2002, 2004, 2007, 2008, 2011, 2012, 2013, 2014). ASBAVOL's student team won the gold medal in the Juegos Deportivos Estudiantiles (Student Sporting Championship) 13 times since 1996 (1996, 1997, 1998, 2002, 2003, 2004, 2006, 2007, 2008, 2009, 2010, 2011, 2012, and 2013) and two times at the Juegos Deportivos Estudiantiles Centroamericanos (Central American Student Sporting Championship) in 2010 and 2013. In addition, ASBOVAL has fielded championship teams in other youth divisions. Players from ASBAVOL regularly play for the Costa Rica women's national volleyball team. El Liceo de Santa Bárbara's gym is the site of many volleyball games.

=== Soccer ===
Beginning in 1943, Club Sport Barbareño represented Santa Bárbara in the first division of the national soccer league. The team changed its name to Asociación Deportiva Barbareña (Bárbara Sports Association) in 1984. The team plays within the national Costa Rican soccer hierarchy. Between 1962 and 1975, it was a third division team. Between 1975 and 1981, as well as 1993 and 1997, it was a second division team. Between 1997 and 2004, it was a first division team. In 2004, the team was sold and moved to Puntarenas, becoming Puntarenas F.C. It currently plays in the third division at the Carlos Alvarado Villalobos Stadium in Santa Bárbara, which holds 1,500 spectators.

Another team in the municipality was Deportivo Machado F.C. Although they were rivals from the 1950s to the 1970s, Asociación Deportiva Barbareña absorbed Machado's players when the team folded in the mid-1980s.

Players such as Abdulio Jiménez Araya, and goalie Carlos "El Aguilucho" Alvarado played with Asociación Deportiva Barbareña and Deportivo Machado F.C.

== Geography ==
Santa Bárbara has an area of 1.27 km² and an elevation of 1,140 metres.

The municipality is a part of the Greater Metropolitan Area. The district of Santa Bárbara is the smallest district of the Santa Bárbara canton. With respect to the other districts, Santa Bárbara is the most central.

Santa Bárbara is in the Cordillera Central. It is a potential disaster zone, like many other areas of Costa Rica. The elevation is approximately 1,140m meters above sea-level, within Cordillera Central . The Potrerillos River runs through the northwest side of the district while the Quebrada Cruz is the border between the Santa Bárbara and the district of San Juan de Santa Bárbara.

== Demographics ==
Historical population
Census	Pop.	±% p.a.
1864	1,762	—
1883	638	−5.21%
1892	688	+0.84%
1927	900	+0.77%
1950	1,126	+0.98%
1963	1,648	+2.97%
1973	2,496	+4.24%
1984	3,667	+3.56%
2000	5,452	+2.51%
2011	5,944	+0.79%
2022	5,130	−1.33%
Source: Instituto Nacional de Estadística y Censos; Centro Centroamericano de Población

For the 2011 census, Santa Bárbara had a population of 5,944 inhabitants.

== Transportation ==
=== Road transportation ===
The district is covered by the following road routes:

- National Route 123
- National Route 127
- National Route 128

Most of the majors routes in the canton originate in Santa Bárbara's central plaza. Route 123 (Calle Las Americas) passes along the southern side of the plaza, beginning in San Juan de Santa Bárbara, going west toward San Pedro de Santa Bárbara and Alajuela. Route 128 goes from the plaza toward Jesús de Santa Bárbara and Barva. Route 127 goes from Santa Bárbara toward Zetillal and San Bosco. In addition, Calle Guapichelines starts in the north of the city. Santa Bárbara is in the Cordillera Central.
