= National Route 126 (Costa Rica) =

Road in Costa Rica

National Secondary Route 126
- Ruta nacional secundaria 126
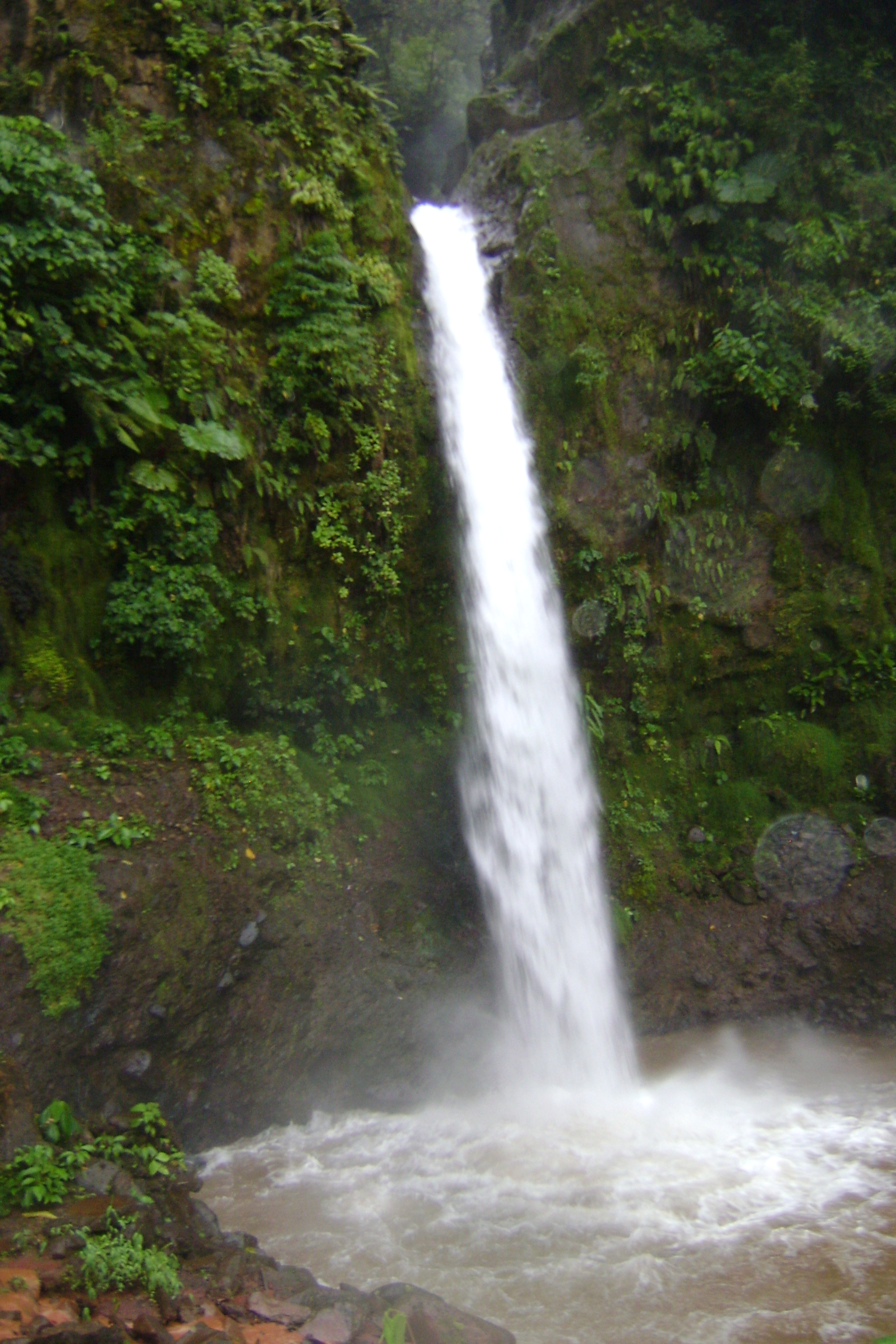
- La Paz waterfall is a scenic spot along Route 126.

Route information
- Maintained by Ministry of Public Works and Transport
- Length: 73.505 km (45.674 mi)

Major junctions
- South end: Route 3
- Route 119; Route 128; Route 114; Route 127; Route 125; Route 120; Route 140
- North end: Route 4

Location
- Country: Costa Rica
- Provinces: Alajuela, Heredia

Highway system
- National Road Network of Costa Rica
← Route 125	→ Route 127

National Secondary Route 126, or just Route 126 (Spanish: Ruta Nacional Secundaria 126, or Ruta 126) is a National Road Route of Costa Rica located in the Alajuela and Heredia provinces. It connects Route 3 and Route 4.

== Description ==
Starting at the downtown area of Heredia canton, at Route 3, this road goes through Heredia, Barva, Carrizal, and Varablanca slightly following the province limit between Heredia and Alajuela, until arriving to Route 4 at Bajos de Chilamate in Sarapiquí.

It allows access to the Poás Volcano National Park when driving from Heredia, by turning at Route 120.

In the southern area of the route, near Barva canton, there are many coffee plantations, and further north in Varablanca there are strawberry orchards.

Making use of the eastern lowlands segment of Route 32 and Route 4, this route connects the Greater Metropolitan Area to the Caribbean districts, which is a recommended alternate route in case of emergency when there are landslides in the Braulio Carrillo national park section of Route 32.

In Alajuela province the route covers Alajuela canton (Carrizal, San Isidro, and Sarapiquí districts).

In Heredia province the route covers Heredia canton (Heredia, Mercedes, and Varablanca districts), Barva canton (Barva, San Pedro, and San Pablo districts), Santa Bárbara canton (Jesús, Santo Domingo, and Purabá districts), and Sarapiquí canton (La Virgen district).

== Locations ==
Administrative regions covered by this route and their junctions at the district level.

Province	Canton	District	km	mi	Destinations	Notes
Alajuela	Alajuela	Carrizal			Route 125	
Alajuela	Alajuela	San Isidro				
Alajuela	Alajuela	Sarapiquí			Route 140	
Heredia	Heredia	Heredia			Route 3	
Heredia	Heredia	Mercedes				
Heredia	Heredia	Varablanca			Route 120	
Heredia	Barva	Barva			Route 119; Route 128	
Heredia	Barva	San Pedro				
Heredia	Barva	San Pablo			Route 114	
Heredia	Santa Bárbara	Jesús			Route 114	
Heredia	Santa Bárbara	Santo Domingo				
Heredia	Santa Bárbara	Purabá			Route 127	
Heredia	Sarapiquí	La Virgen			Route 4	

== History ==
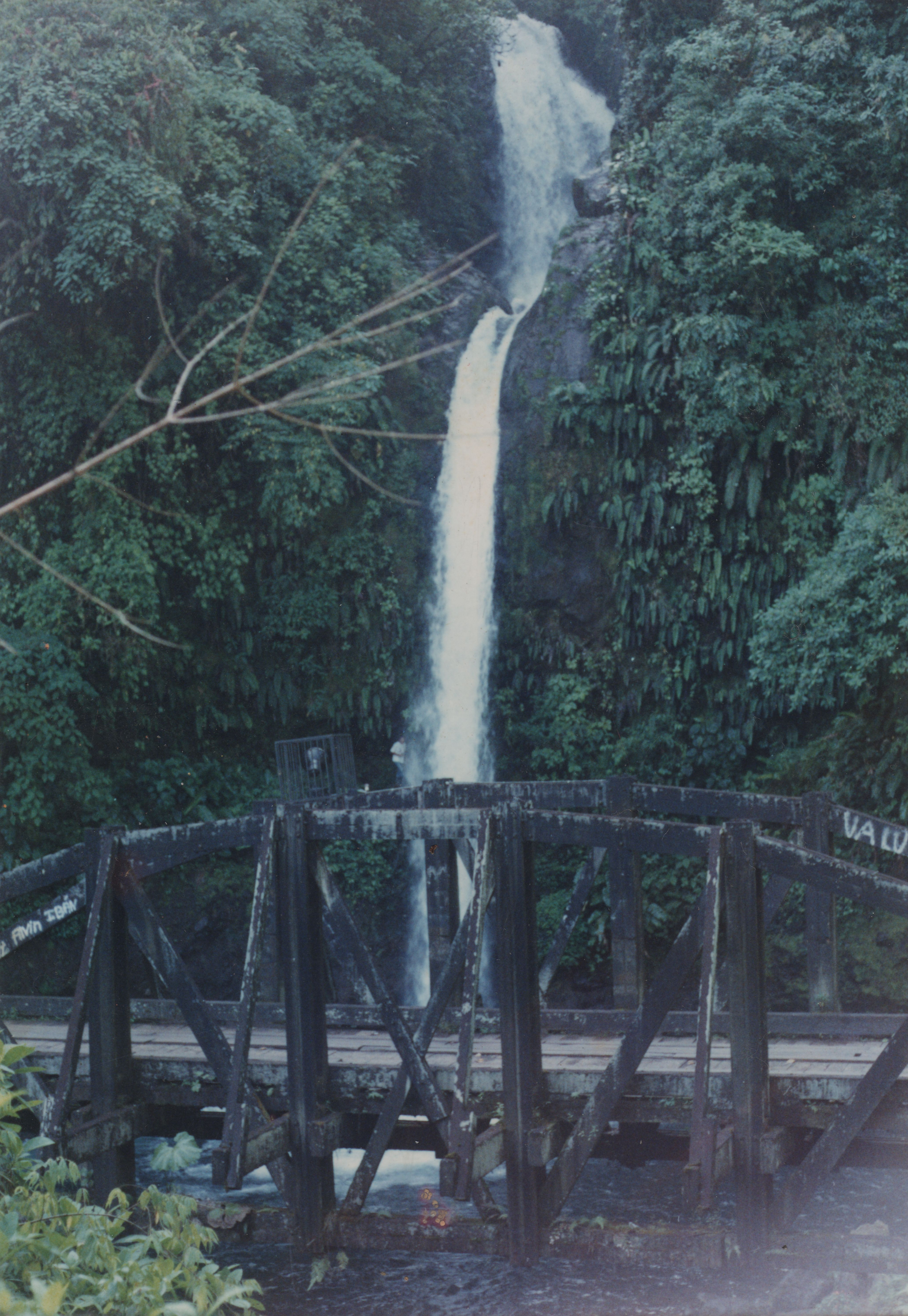
Old wood bridge near La Paz waterfall, circa 1990

An historic route in the country, an approximate route was used to export goods to Europe by the Spanish colonials.

Was partially destroyed by the 2009 Cinchona earthquake, reconstruction took five years and was concluded on 2014.

Among the major construction works in the route, the bridge over Quebrada Seca (Seca creek) was rebuilt from one to four lanes and new sidewalks, finishing in January 2014.

=== La Paz waterfall bridges ===
The scenic spot to overlook La Paz waterfall, on the La Paz Grande river, is served by a bridge that has been destroyed two times, in 2003 the 65 years old original wood bridge fell due to heavy machinery transportation, a Bailey bridge was installed, which due to a torrential storm, was destroyed by the river in 2013. A new Bailey bridge was again installed, a meter higher than before, opened in September 2013.
