= Purabá =

District in Santa Bárbara canton, Heredia province, Costa Rica

- District
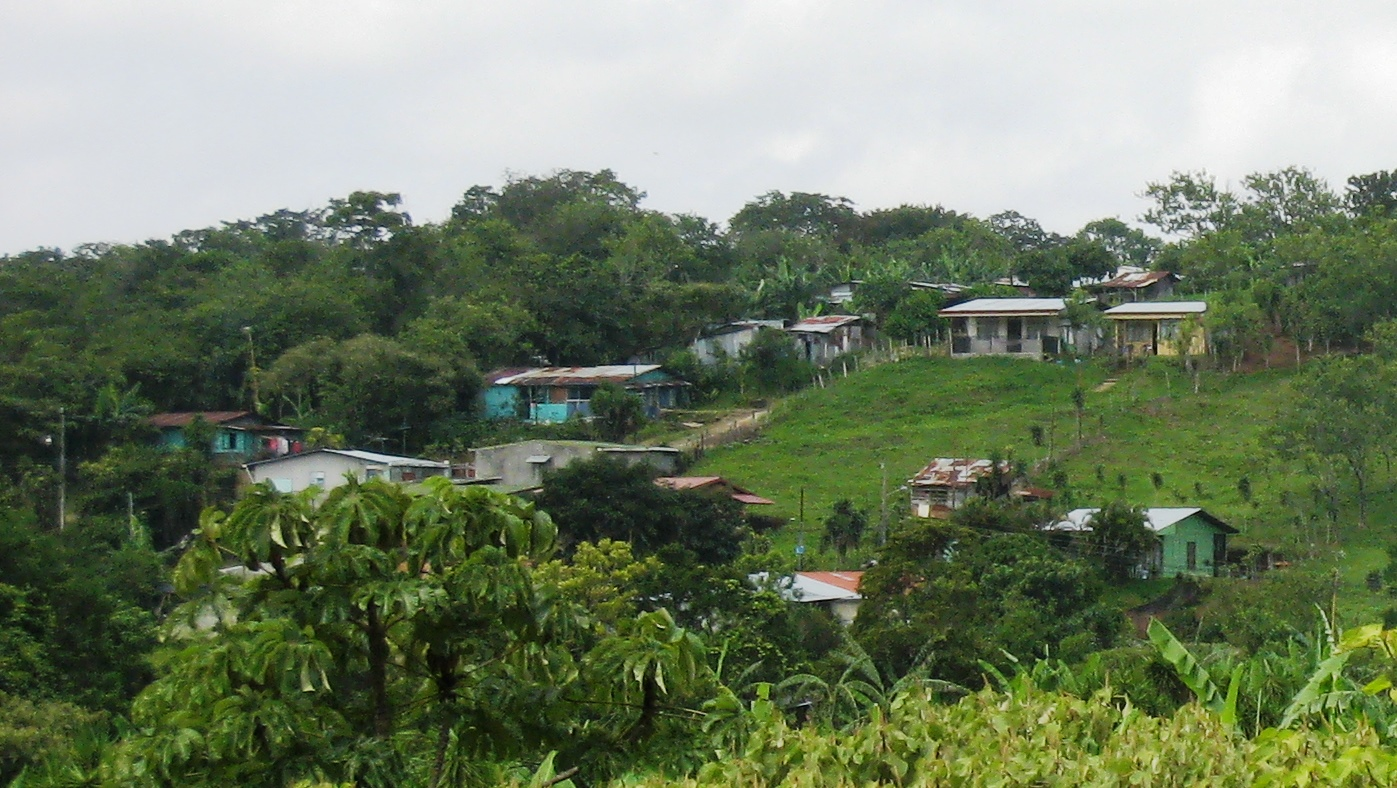
- A neighborhood in Purabá de Santa Bárbara
- Purabá district
- Purabá district location in Costa Rica
- Coordinates: 10.0662393°N 84.1509519°W
- Country: Costa Rica
- Province: Heredia
- Canton: Santa Bárbara
- Creation: 2 September 1976

Area
  - Total: 6.09 km^{2} (2.35 sq mi)
- Elevation: 1,240 m (4,070 ft)

Population (2011)
  - Total: 4,573
  - Density: 751/km^{2} (1,940/sq mi)
- Demonym(s): Vecino de Purabá, Purabáeño
- Time zone: UTC−06:00
- Postal code: 40406

Purabá is a district of the Santa Bárbara canton, in the Heredia province of Costa Rica. The district consists of several large neighborhoods: San Bosco (Bosconia), Marías, Purabá, Lajas, and Calle Quirós.

== History ==
Purabá was created on 2 September 1976 by Decreto Ejecutivo 6370-G. Segregated from Santo Domingo.

Like the rest of the canton, the area now known as Villa Jesús was originally occupied before the Spanish settlers came by the Huetares, an indigenous tribe. The Huetare King, Cacique Garabito, dominated the area.

In early 1663, settler Joseph de Sandoval Ocampo set up cattle ranches in the area, including one toward the between the present-day areas of San Pedro and Purabá, which was called Tapatalanga or Anonos at the time. Heredia, Barva, and Alajuela, three neighboring cities, were populated and settled in the late 1700s. As trade increased between the three cities, the canton developed.

Recalling her childhood of making dolls out of plantain leaves in Purabá, former teacher María Cecilia Alfaro Víquez, born in 1940, said that the roads were made of pebbles and dirt. The culture and economy of sugarcane production was so widespread that even children like Alfaro Víquez made toy sugar mills. In 1949, a bridge was constructed in the district, blessed by the local Catholic priest.

Purabá is the newest district in Santa Bárbara, created in 1976.^{2} The backbone of Purabá's economy is agricultural production, particularly sugarcane cultivation, even though sugarcane grows best at lower elevations. Up until 1975, Ingenio Agroindustrial Las Marías was a buyer of agricultural products for domestic consumption, but it moved to Grecia in 1975.

== Geography ==
Purabá has an area of 6.09 km^{2} and an elevation of 1,240 metres.

Like much of Costa Rica, the Comisión Nacional de Prevención de Riesgos (National Risk Prevention Commission) puts Purabá in a high-risk zone. This is due to the district's mountainous geography, which can lead to landslides and flooding. The highest part of Purabá is on the lower slopes of the Barva Massif, also known as Barva Volcano, at 2.400 metres (7.87 ft) above sea level. The lowest part, at San Juan, is at 1.000 metre (3.281 ft) above sea level. The Barva volcanic massif is part of a mountain range which includes volcanic cones. So part of Purabá de Santa Bárbara is in the foothills of Barva Volcano. Several large rivers run through Purabá. These include Quebrada Setillal, Rio Ciruelas, Rio Pacayas, Rio Dorita. In 2010, the canton outlined plans to prevent future natural disasters in the district.

== Economy ==
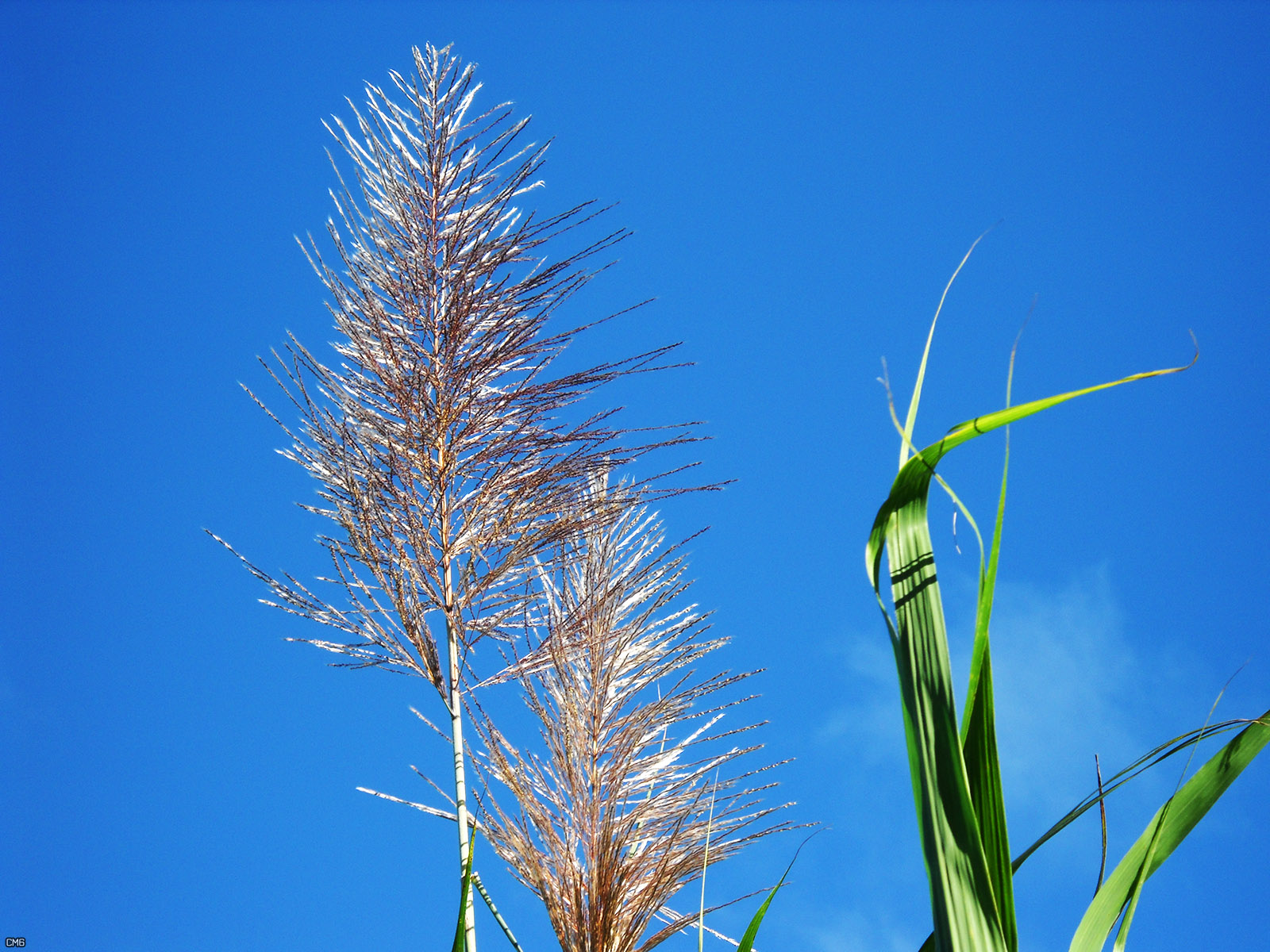
Sugarcane has been the backbone of Purabá's economy

Purabá's real estate holdings, private, public, and ecclesiastic, are assessed according to national law. There are various commercial businesses in Purabá, including a pharmacy, restaurants and corner stores.

In 2010 the Santa Bárbara canton planned to improve Purabá's environmental protections with the goal of improving tourism. The plans include reforestation, cleaning rivers, and setting up protected areas.

== Public and social services ==
An EBAIS, Equipo Básico de Atención Integral en Salud (Basic Medical Care Center), is located in the San Bosco neighborhood, serving residents and non-residents of the district. The Catholic Church serves the region through the Archdiocese of Alajuela. In Purabá, there is a public cemetery maintained by the canton.

The district is partially electrified by the Instituto Costarricense de Electricidad. Like many areas of the country, at various times, Purabá has suffered from problems with water distribution, despite the 24 springs and wells that exist in the area. Because of these problems, the canton created plans to improve Purabá's water distribution before 2020 by improving delivery and building a water treatment plant.

There are three elementary schools that serve the entire district: Escuela Don Bosco, Escuela Rodolfo Peter Sheider, and Calle Quirós. By 2020, the district would like to expand the gyms of Escuela Don Bosco and Escuela Rodolfo Peter Sheider, as well as add a computer lab to Escuela Rodolfo Peter Sheider. In addition to serving as schools, Escuela Don Bosco and Escuela Rodolfo also serve as voting centers during general elections and primaries. Students from the district usually attend Colegio Santa Bárbara High School, but may also go to the high schools in Barva or Heredia.

== Demographics ==
Historical population
Census	Pop.	±% p.a.
1984	2,070	—
2000	3,600	+3.52%
2011	4,573	+2.20%
2022	6,101	+2.66%
Source: Instituto Nacional de Estadística y Censos; Centro Centroamericano de Población

For the 2011 census, Purabá had a population of 4,573 inhabitants.

== Transportation ==
=== Road transportation ===
The district is covered by the following road routes:

- National Route 126
- National Route 127
