= San Juan de Santa Bárbara =

District in Santa Bárbara canton, Heredia province, Costa Rica

San Juan
- District
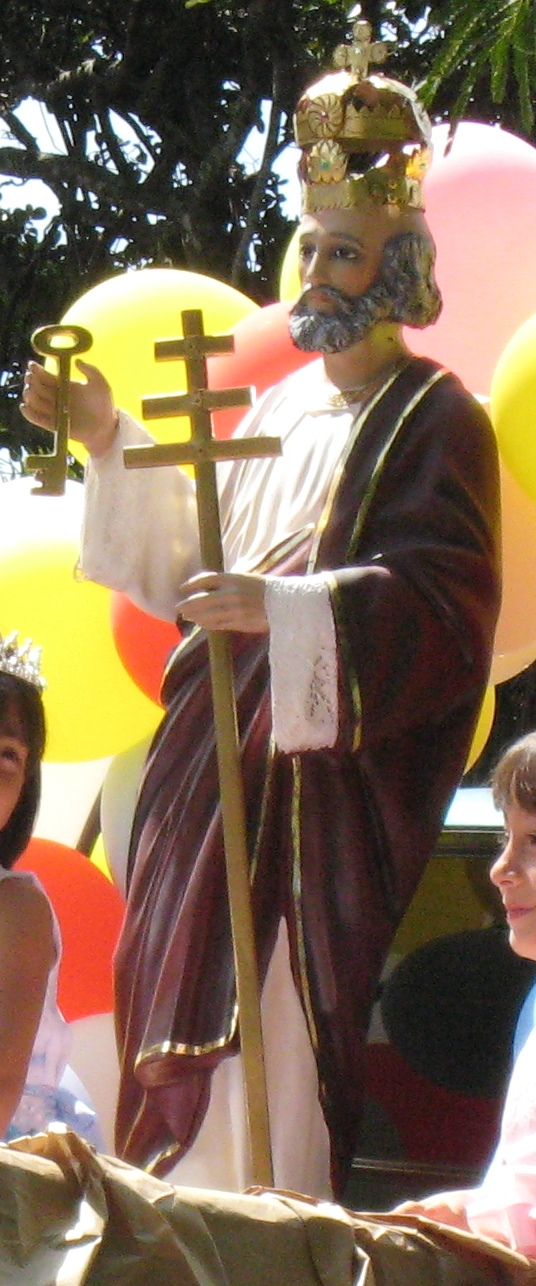
- San Juan de Santa Bárbara de Heredia's Patron Saint
- San Juan district
- San Juan district location in Costa Rica
- Coordinates: 10.0193837°N 84.1576205°W
- Country: Costa Rica
- Province: Heredia
- Canton: Santa Bárbara

Area
  - Total: 4.45 km^{2} (1.72 sq mi)
- Elevation: 1,045 m (3,428 ft)

Population (2011)
  - Total: 7,662
  - Density: 1,720/km^{2} (4,460/sq mi)
- Demonym(s): Vecino de San Juan, San Juaneño
- Time zone: UTC−06:00
- Postal code: 40403
- Climate: Am

San Juan is a district of the Santa Bárbara canton, in the Heredia province of Costa Rica. The district consists of two major neighborhoods: San Juan Arriba (Upper San Juan), and San Juan Abajo (Lower San Juan).

== History ==
Like the rest of the canton, before the Spanish settlers came, Santa Bárbara was originally occupied by the Huetares, an indigenous tribe. The Huetare King, Cacique Garabito, dominated the area. When the Spanish arrived, they originally called the area Churruca or Surruco. Heredia, Barva, and Alajuela, three neighboring cities, were populated and settled in the late 1700s. As trade increased between the three cities, the canton developed.

In 1836, an Englishman named John Hale sold his land to residents of what is now San Juan. The land was bought using profits from the sugarcane that was grown at the time. On 7 December 1848, the fourth canton of Heredia was created, with San Juan as a founding district.

In 1852, Horacio Morales helped build the first chapel in San Juan, although many parishioners still went to Santa Bárbara. By 1885, the district educated as many boys as girls, with schools for both.

San Juan inaugurated the canton's first hydroelectric plant in 1914 along the Porrosatí River that separates the districts of Santa Bárbara and San Juan. During Ricardo Jiménez Oreamuno second term in office, between 1924 and 1928, water delivery systems were installed in San Juan using water from the Potrerillos River.

== Economy ==
San Juan's main economic activity is agricultural production, particularly coffee. In 1973, 1,074 kilograms of coffee were produced in San Juan. Because of a sawmill in the district, another important activity was lumber production.

There are various commercial businesses in San Juan, including restaurants and corner stores. There is a coffee processing facility in San Juan which serves many local farmers. San Juan is locally known for a ceviche restaurant near its central plaza.

== Culture and education ==
San Juan was featured in an episode of Repretel's "Informe Once" (Eleven Report). The episode described several cottage industries in the district, including an agricultural producer and an ice-cream maker, as well as a country house in the traditional Costa Rican adobe and cane style.

There are two private schools in San Juan: Colegio Bilingüe Nueva Esperanza (New Hope Bilingual High School), where 590 students attended in 2009, and Puente Verde (Green Bridge). Colegio Bilingüe Nueva Esperanza, founded in 1993, was the first private technical school in the country, meaning students received specialized in computer skills. The main public elementary school is Tranquilino Saenz Rojas. Students from San Juan usually attend Colegio Santa Bárbara High School, but may also go to the high schools in Alajuela. In 2012, resident Noelia Villalobos Solórzano received the Panamanian Rubén Darío Prize for her work in education.

== Administration ==
San Juan is served by the police force of Heredia. An EBAIS, Equipo Básico de Atención Integral en Salud (Basic Medical Care Center), is located in San Juan, serving residents and non-residents of the district. In addition, there is a private nursing home located in the district.

The canton has investigated the possibility of making microbusiness outreach to the residents of San Juan, especially toward women and artisans. The canton's first priority, however, is to build a police station within the district.

== Geography ==
San Juan has an area of 4.45 km^{2} and an elevation of 1,045 metres.

It has the lowest elevation of the canton. It is directly south of the municipality of Santa Bárbara de Heredia, divided into two main neighborhoods: San Juan Arriba (Upper San Juan), and San Juan Abajo (Lower San Juan). In addition, there are other neighborhoods: Cinco Esquinas (Five Points), Villa Margarita, Tierra Santa (Holy Land), Calle Zapote (Zapote Street), and several developments. Routes 123 and 119 pass through San Juan.

The Zanjón River, Quebrada la Claudia, and Porrosatí River run through San Juan. During the rainy season, San Juan is subject to flooding, as was the case in May 2014 when more than 100 houses were affected by clogged drainage systems. Like much of Costa Rica, San Juan is part of a high-risk zone, according to the Comisión Nacional de Prevención de Riesgos (National Risk Prevention Commission).

== Demographics ==
Historical population
Census	Pop.	±% p.a.
1883	507	—
1892	596	+1.81%
1927	647	+0.23%
1950	896	+1.43%
1963	1,352	+3.22%
1973	1,830	+3.07%
1984	3,502	+6.08%
2000	6,245	+3.68%
2011	7,662	+1.88%
2022	8,707	+1.17%
Source: Instituto Nacional de Estadística y Censos; Centro Centroamericano de Población

For the 2011 census, San Juan had a population of 7,662 inhabitants.

== Transportation ==
=== Road transportation ===
The district is covered by the following road routes:

- National Route 119
- National Route 123
