= Bernardo Rodríguez y Alfaro =

Costa Rican politician

Bernardo Rodríguez y Alfaro (born August 20, 1781) was a Costa Rican politician and signer of the Act of Independence of the Republic of Costa Rica.

== Personal life and background ==
Bernardo was born in Heredia, a county of Costa Rica. He was married on June 17, 1804 in Barva.

== Career ==
In October of 1821, Bernardo was appointed as a representative to the City Council of Barva on the Board of the Legacy of the councils. This group met at Cartago from October, 25–26, 1821 to discuss the independence of Costa Rica from Spain. On October 29, 1821 he signed the Act of Independence, which proclaimed Costa Rica a free and independent state.

From April 16–30, 1823 he represented the town of Barva in the Constituent Congress, which was chaired by José María de Peralta y La Vega.
