= San Jose Metropolitan Area =

The San Jose Metropolitan Area may refer to:

- The Greater Metropolitan Area (Costa Rica)
- The San Jose–Sunnyvale–Santa Clara, CA MSA (metropolitan statistical area) in California
