= Sarapiquí =

Sarapiquí may refer to:

- Sarapiquí (canton), in the province of Heredia, Costa Rica
- Sarapiquí, Alajuela, a district in the canton of Alajuela, Costa Rica
- Sarapiquí River in the province of Heredia, Costa Rica
