= Tarrazú =

Tarrazu may refer to:

- Tarrazú (canton)
- Tarrazú coffee
