= San José de la Montaña District =

District in Barva canton, Heredia province, Costa Rica

San José de la Montaña
- District
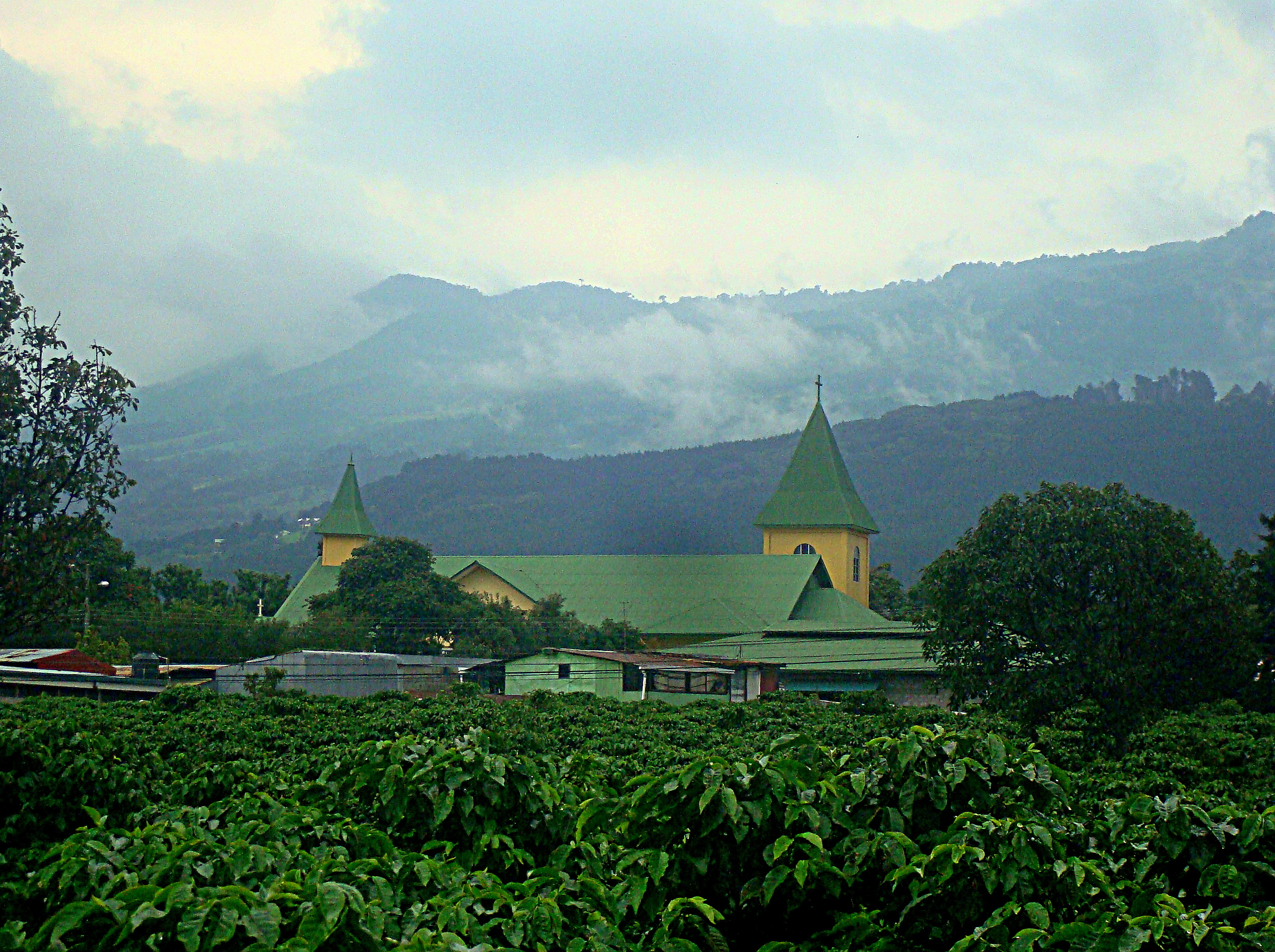
- San José de la Montaña, Barva, Heredia
- San José de la Montaña district
- San José de la Montaña district location in Costa Rica
- Coordinates: 10.0894139°N 84.1082365°W
- Country: Costa Rica
- Province: Heredia
- Canton: Barva
- Creation: 5 July 1954

Area
  - Total: 36.82 km^{2} (14.22 sq mi)
- Elevation: 1,530 m (5,020 ft)

Population (2011)
  - Total: 5,377
  - Density: 146.0/km^{2} (378.2/sq mi)
- Time zone: UTC−06:00
- Postal code: 40206

San José de la Montaña is a district of the Barva canton, in the Heredia province of Costa Rica.

== History ==
San José de la Montaña was created on 5 July 1954 by Decreto Ejecutivo 35.

== Geography ==
San José de la Montaña has an area of 36.82 km^{2} and an elevation of 1,530 metres.

== Demographics ==
Historical population
Census	Pop.	±% p.a.
1963	1,541	—
1973	2,081	+3.05%
1984	2,782	+2.67%
2000	3,801	+1.97%
2011	5,377	+3.20%
2022	6,093	+1.14%
Source: Instituto Nacional de Estadística y Censos; Centro Centroamericano de Población

For the 2011 census, San José de la Montaña had a population of 5,377 inhabitants.

== Transportation ==
=== Road transportation ===
The district is covered by the following road routes:

- National Route 113
- National Route 114
