= Carrizal District =

District in Alajuela province, Costa Rica

Carrizal
- District
- Interactive map of Carrizal
- Carrizal district location in Costa Rica
- Coordinates: 10.0877656°N 84.176284°W
- Country: Costa Rica
- Province: Alajuela
- Canton: Alajuela

Area
  - Total: 16.12 km^{2} (6.22 sq mi)
- Elevation: 1,470 m (4,820 ft)

Population (2011)
  - Total: 6,856
  - Density: 425.3/km^{2} (1,102/sq mi)
- Time zone: UTC−06:00
- Postal code: 20103

Carrizal is a district of the Alajuela canton, in the Alajuela province of Costa Rica.

== Geography ==
Carrizal has an area of 16.12 km^{2} (6.22 sq mi) and an elevation of 1,470 metres (4,820 ft).

== Demographics ==
Historical population
Census	Pop.	±% p.a.
1883	265	—
1927	919	+2.87%
1950	1,272	+1.42%
1963	1,988	+3.49%
1973	2,694	+3.09%
1984	3,143	+1.41%
2000	6,455	+4.60%
2011	6,856	+0.55%
2022	8,288	+1.74%
Source: Instituto Nacional de Estadística y Censos; Centro Centroamericano de Población

For the 2011 census, Carrizal had a population of 6,856 inhabitants.

== Transportation ==
=== Road transportation ===
The district is covered by the following road routes:

- National Route 125
- National Route 126
