= Jesús de Santa Bárbara =

District in Santa Bárbara canton, Heredia province, Costa Rica

Jesús
- District
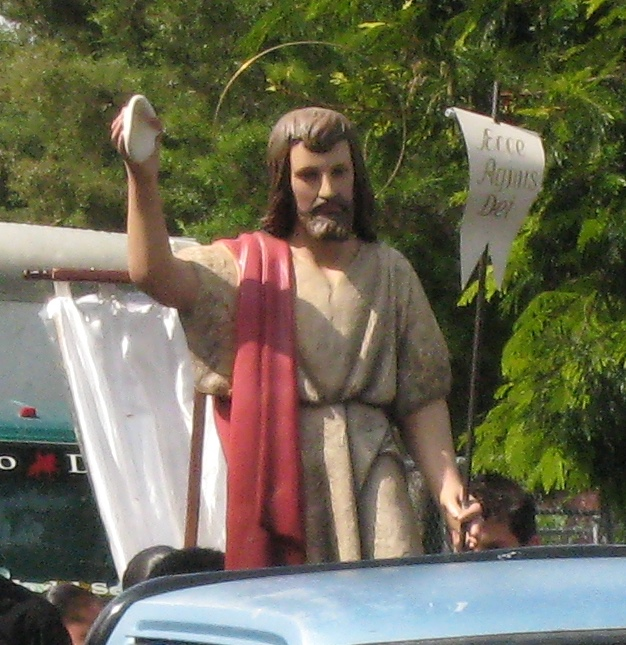
- Jesús de Santa Bárbara's ecclesiastical statue of Jesus
- Interactive map of Jesús
- Jesús district location in Costa Rica
- Coordinates: 10.0548486°N 84.1408762°W
- Country: Costa Rica
- Province: Heredia
- Canton: Santa Bárbara

Area
  - Total: 11.18 km^{2} (4.32 sq mi)
- Elevation: 1,160 m (3,810 ft)

Population (2011)
  - Total: 9,603
  - Density: 858.9/km^{2} (2,225/sq mi)
- Demonym(s): Vecino de Jesús, Jesúseño
- Time zone: UTC−06:00
- Postal code: 40404
- Climate: Am

Jesús, also called Barrio Jesús, is a district of the Santa Bárbara canton, in the Heredia province of Costa Rica. The district consists of several large neighborhoods: Altagracia, Birrí, Catalina, Común, Cuesta Colorada, La Máquina, Guachipelines, Guaracha, and Ulises.

== History ==
Like the rest of the canton, before the Spanish settlers came, Jesús was originally occupied by the Huetares, an indigenous tribe. The Huetare King, Cacique Garabito, dominated the area.

In early 1663, settler Joseph de Sandoval Ocampo arrived in the region of Jesús in order to set up a cattle farm. Heredia, Barva, and Alajuela, three neighboring cities, were populated and settled in the late 1700s. As trade increased between the three cities, the canton developed.

Jesús officially became a district in the canton of Santa Bárbara on 7 December 1848. This official recognition from the national government came when Santa Bárbara was declared the fourth canton of Heredia Province, thanks to the efforts of Gregorio Salazar.

By 1852, resident Horacio Morales had successfully lobbied Jesúseños to construct a small chapel in the district. By 1885, there were two public schools for children in Jesús. One was for boys and one was for girls. Jesús was one of the last of Santa Bárbara's districts to receive running water, sometime after 1911. It was electrified in 1937.

== Geography and wildlife ==
Jesús has an area of 11.18 km^{2} and an elevation of 1,160 metres.

Major neighborhoods include Calle Solís, Mitad Sur de la Cuesta Colorada (Lower Red Hill), Quebrada la Cruz (Cruz River), Urbanización Cifuentes, Calle de Trapiche, Rosa Blanca (White Rose), La Teofila, and Central Jesús. In the northwest of the district are the neighborhoods of Birrí, La Catalina, La Cuesta Colorada (Red Hill), and San José de Altagracia.

Like much of Costa Rica, the Comisión Nacional de Prevención de Riesgos (National Risk Prevention Commission) puts Jesús in a high-risk zone. This is due to the district's mountainous geography, which can lead to landslides and flooding. Several large rivers run through Jesús. These include Quebrada Burros, Quebrada Birrí, Río Porrosati, and Quebrada Cruz.

Over 60 different species of birds have been observed in Jesús.

== Economy ==
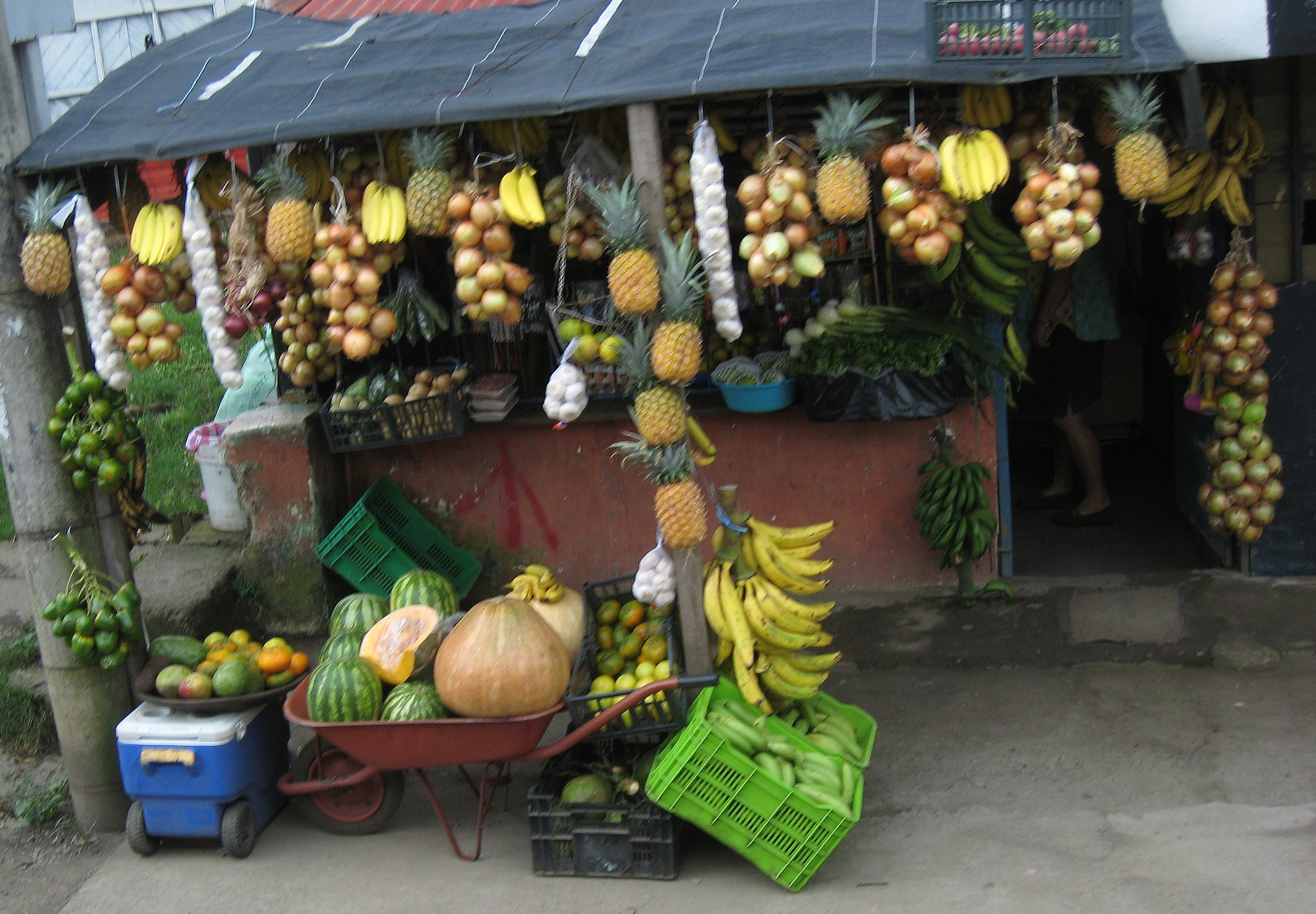
Fruit stand in La Maquina Neighborhood of Jesús de Santa Bárbara (de Heredia)

The backbone of Jesús' economy is agricultural production, particularly coffee. In 1973, 1,810 kilograms of coffee were produced in Jesús. In addition, Jesús is a major producer of sugarcane. There is an active recycling group in the district.

There are various commercial businesses in Jesús, including supermarkets, restaurants and corner stores. There is also a developed tourist industry in the district, which includes Hotel Rosa Blanca, a small, luxury hotel. Hotel Monte Campana, located in Birrí, includes ranches, swimming pools, and other activities. Another hotel in the district is La Catalina. There are businesses with stocked lakes and rivers for tourists interested in fishing. In addition, Café Britt maintains a distribution center on Highway 128, west of central Jesus.

== Education and public services ==
An EBAIS, Equipo Básico de Atención Integral en Salud (Basic Medical Care Center), is located in Jesús, serving residents and non-residents of the district. The Catholic Church serves the region through the Archdiocese of Alajuela.

There are now three elementary schools in the district: Alfredo Volio Jiménez, located in Birrí, Alfredo González Flores, located on highway 126, and Escuela Jesús in central Jesús. Students from the district usually attend Colegio Santa Bárbara High School, but may also go to the high schools in Barva or Heredia. Jesús is home to a private language school: The Amistad Institute. The Amistad Institute has a five-acre campus close to the center of Jesús.

== Demographics ==
Historical population
Census	Pop.	±% p.a.
1883	636	—
1892	690	+0.91%
1927	837	+0.55%
1950	945	+0.53%
1963	1,556	+3.91%
1973	2,144	+3.26%
1984	3,717	+5.13%
2000	7,585	+4.56%
2011	9,603	+2.17%
2022	10,729	+1.01%
Source: Instituto Nacional de Estadística y Censos; Centro Centroamericano de Población

For the 2011 census, Jesús had a population of 9,603 inhabitants.

== Transportation ==
=== Road transportation ===
The district is covered by the following road routes:

- National Route 114
- National Route 126
- National Route 128
