= Barrantes District =

District in Flores canton, Heredia province, Costa Rica

Barrantes
- District
- Interactive map of Barrantes
- Barrantes district location in Costa Rica
- Coordinates: 10.0144801°N 84.1534671°W
- Country: Costa Rica
- Province: Heredia
- Canton: Flores

Area
  - Total: 2.3 km^{2} (0.89 sq mi)
- Elevation: 1,180 m (3,870 ft)

Population (2011)
  - Total: 4,091
  - Density: 1,800/km^{2} (4,600/sq mi)
- Time zone: UTC−06:00
- Postal code: 40802

Barrantes is a district of the Flores canton, in the Heredia province of Costa Rica.

== Geography ==
Barrantes has an area of 2.3 km² and an elevation of 1,180 metres.

== Demographics ==
Historical population
| Census | Pop. | ±% p.a. |
|---|---|---|
| 1927 | 775 | — |
| 1950 | 852 | +0.41% |
| 1963 | 1,075 | +1.80% |
| 1973 | 1,457 | +3.09% |
| 1984 | 1,895 | +2.42% |
| 2000 | 2,810 | +2.49% |
| 2011 | 4,091 | +3.47% |
| 2022 | 5,382 | +2.52% |
Source: Instituto Nacional de Estadística y Censos; Centro Centroamericano de Población

For the 2011 census, Barrantes had a population of 4,091 inhabitants.

== Transportation ==
=== Road transportation ===
The district is covered by the following road routes:

- National Route 119
- National Route 123
