= San Roque District, Barva =

District in Barva canton, Heredia province, Costa Rica

San Roque
- District
- San Roque district
- San Roque district location in Costa Rica
- Coordinates: 10.0155026°N 84.1366408°W
- Country: Costa Rica
- Province: Heredia
- Canton: Barva

Area
  - Total: 1.29 km^{2} (0.50 sq mi)
- Elevation: 1,110 m (3,640 ft)

Population (2011)
  - Total: 4,622
  - Density: 3,580/km^{2} (9,280/sq mi)
- Time zone: UTC−06:00
- Postal code: 40204

San Roque is a district of the Barva canton, in the Heredia province of Costa Rica.

== Geography ==
San Roque has an area of 1.29 km² and an elevation of 1,110 metres.

== Demographics ==
Historical population
Census	Pop.	±% p.a.
1883	223	—
1892	301	+3.39%
1927	280	−0.21%
1950	359	+1.09%
1963	622	+4.32%
1973	886	+3.60%
1984	1,750	+6.38%
2000	3,071	+3.58%
2011	4,622	+3.79%
2022	6,012	+2.42%
Source: Instituto Nacional de Estadística y Censos; Centro Centroamericano de Población

For the 2011 census, San Roque had a population of 4,622 inhabitants.

== Transportation ==
=== Road transportation ===
The district is covered by the following road routes:

- National Route 119
- National Route 128
