= Ark Herb Farm =

Coordinates: 10.0415°N 84.1694°W

Ark Herb Farm is a 20 acres (8.1 ha) farm in Santa Bárbara de Heredia, approximately 3 mi (4.8 km) northwest of Heredia, Costa Rica on the slopes of the Poás Volcano. The farm grows 300 varieties of herbs and fruit.
