= National Route 127 (Costa Rica) =

National Road Route in Costa Rica

National Secondary Route 127
- Ruta nacional secundaria 127

Route information
- Maintained by Ministry of Public Works and Transport
- Length: 5.070 km (3.150 mi)

Location
- Country: Costa Rica
- Provinces: Heredia

Highway system
- National Road Network of Costa Rica
← Route 126	→ Route 128

National Secondary Route 127, or just Route 127 (Spanish: Ruta Nacional Secundaria 127, or Ruta 127) is a National Road Route of Costa Rica located in the Heredia province.

== Description ==
In Heredia province the route covers Santa Bárbara canton (Santa Bárbara and Purabá districts).
