= San Pablo District, Barva =

District in Barva canton, Heredia province, Costa Rica

San Pablo
- District
- San Pablo district
- San Pablo district location in Costa Rica
- Coordinates: 10.0497025°N 84.1163985°W
- Country: Costa Rica
- Province: Heredia
- Canton: Barva

Area
  - Total: 6.94 km^{2} (2.68 sq mi)
- Elevation: 1,300 m (4,300 ft)

Population (2011)
  - Total: 8,319
  - Density: 1,200/km^{2} (3,100/sq mi)
- Time zone: UTC−06:00
- Postal code: 40203

San Pablo is a district of the Barva canton, in the Heredia province of Costa Rica.

== Geography ==
San Pablo has an area of 6.94 km² and an elevation of 1,300 metres.

== Demographics ==
Historical population
Census	Pop.	±% p.a.
1883	331	—
1892	513	+4.99%
1927	586	+0.38%
1950	737	+1.00%
1963	1,454	+5.37%
1973	2,377	+5.04%
1984	3,048	+2.29%
2000	6,656	+5.00%
2011	8,319	+2.05%
2022	9,537	+1.25%
Source: Instituto Nacional de Estadística y Censos; Centro Centroamericano de Población

For the 2011 census, San Pablo had a population of 8,319 inhabitants.

== Transportation ==
=== Road transportation ===
The district is covered by the following road routes:

- National Route 113
- National Route 114
- National Route 126
- National Route 128
- National Route 502
