= National Route 125 (Costa Rica) =

National Road Route in Costa Rica

National Secondary Route 125
- Ruta nacional secundaria 125

Route information
- Maintained by Ministry of Public Works and Transport
- Length: 10.660 km (6.624 mi)

Location
- Country: Costa Rica
- Provinces: Alajuela

Highway system
- National Road Network of Costa Rica
← Route 124	→ Route 126

National Secondary Route 125, or just Route 125 (Spanish: Ruta Nacional Secundaria 125, or Ruta 125) is a National Road Route of Costa Rica located in the Alajuela province.

== Description ==
In Alajuela province the route covers Alajuela canton (Alajuela and Carrizal districts).
