= San Pedro District, Barva =

District in Barva canton, Heredia province, Costa Rica

San Pedro
- District
- San Pedro district
- San Pedro district location in Costa Rica
- Coordinates: 10.0436839°N 84.1333967°W
- Country: Costa Rica
- Province: Heredia
- Canton: Barva

Area
  - Total: 7.16 km^{2} (2.76 sq mi)
- Elevation: 1,170 m (3,840 ft)

Population (2011)
  - Total: 9,932
  - Density: 1,390/km^{2} (3,590/sq mi)
- Time zone: UTC−06:00
- Postal code: 40202

San Pedro is a district of the Barva canton, in the Heredia province of Costa Rica.

== Geography ==
San Pedro has an area of 7.16 km^{2} and an elevation of 1,170 metres.

== Demographics ==
Historical population
Census	Pop.	±% p.a.
1883	893	—
1892	986	+1.11%
1927	1,535	+1.27%
1950	2,424	+2.01%
1963	1,762	−2.42%
1973	2,781	+4.67%
1984	4,882	+5.25%
2000	8,560	+3.57%
2011	9,932	+1.36%
2022	12,603	+2.19%
Source: Instituto Nacional de Estadística y Censos; Centro Centroamericano de Población

For the 2011 census, San Pedro had a population of 9,932 inhabitants.

== Transportation ==
=== Road transportation ===
The district is covered by the following road routes:

- National Route 126
- National Route 128
