= Llorente District =

District in Flores canton, Heredia province, Costa Rica

Llorente
- District
- Interactive map of Llorente
- Llorente district location in Costa Rica
- Coordinates: 9.9972671°N 84.1602285°W
- Country: Costa Rica
- Province: Heredia
- Canton: Flores

Area
  - Total: 1.89 km^{2} (0.73 sq mi)
- Elevation: 1,025 m (3,363 ft)

Population (2011)
  - Total: 8,773
  - Density: 4,640/km^{2} (12,000/sq mi)
- Time zone: UTC−06:00
- Postal code: 40803

Llorente is a district of the Flores canton, in the Heredia province of Costa Rica.

== Geography ==
Llorente has an area of 1.89 km^{2} and an elevation of 1,025 metres.

== Demographics ==
Historical population
Census	Pop.	±% p.a.
1927	365	—
1950	636	+2.44%
1963	865	+2.39%
1973	1,443	+5.25%
1984	3,282	+7.76%
2000	5,882	+3.71%
2011	8,773	+3.70%
2022	8,839	+0.07%
Source: Instituto Nacional de Estadística y Censos; Centro Centroamericano de Población

For the 2011 census, Llorente had a population of 8,773 inhabitants.

== Transportation ==
=== Road transportation ===
The district is covered by the following road routes:

- National Route 3
- National Route 123
- National Route 129
