= San Joaquín de Flores =

District in Flores canton, Heredia province, Costa Rica

San Joaquín
- District
- San Joaquín Church
- San Joaquín district
- San Joaquín district location in Costa Rica
- Coordinates: 10.0059992°N 84.1538838°W
- Country: Costa Rica
- Province: Heredia
- Canton: Flores

Area
  - Total: 2.58 km^{2} (1.00 sq mi)
- Elevation: 1,054 m (3,458 ft)

Population (2011)
  - Total: 7,173
  - Density: 2,780/km^{2} (7,200/sq mi)
- Time zone: UTC−06:00
- Postal code: 40801

San Joaquín is a district of the Flores canton, in the Heredia province of Costa Rica.

== Toponymy ==
The town of San Joaquín de Flores is named after Saint Joachim, Mary's father.

== Geography ==
San Joaquín has an area of 2.58 km² and an elevation of 1,054 metres.

== Communities and settlements ==
San Joaquín de Flores District is further divided into smaller units called poblados (or communities) and barrios (or neighborhoods):

- Santa Marta
- Santísima Trinidad
- Santa Cecilia
- Llorente
- Barrantes
- Las Flores
- Los Ángeles
- Los Geranios
- Echeverría
- El Rosario
- Cristo Rey
- Corazón de Jesús

== Important buildings ==
Plaza Llorente San Joaquin

San Joaquín church was built about 1880. Every rock that is part of the church was carried from Cartago by cart, 87 km away along the current national Route 225. Families of San Joaquín donated the statues that today decorate the church gardens. The Spanish painter Jose Claro—who also made paintings for a church in San Antonio de Prado, near Medellín, Colombia—painted the images inside the church. It has also a cavern with a Lourdes Virgin and armchairs made of stone to sit down and view the garden flowers.

== Education ==
The official San Joaquin primary school is Escuela Estados Unidos de America Liceo Regional de Flores and Colegio Tecnico are the two public high schools located in San Joaquin.

San Joaquin de Flores notably is the hometown of renowned microbiologist S. Gutierrez. The U.S. educated microbiologist is known for the study of chemical interactions between proteins in chlamydia.

== Demographics ==
Historical population
Census	Pop.	±% p.a.
1864	870	—
1883	1,266	+1.99%
1892	1,641	+2.92%
1927	1,343	−0.57%
1950	1,392	+0.16%
1963	2,222	+3.66%
1973	3,624	+5.01%
1984	3,838	+0.52%
2000	6,346	+3.19%
2011	7,173	+1.12%
2022	7,805	+0.77%
Source: Instituto Nacional de Estadística y Censos; Centro Centroamericano de Población

For the 2011 census, San Joaquín had a population of 7,173 inhabitants.

== Transportation ==
=== Road transportation ===
The district is covered by the following road routes:

- National Route 123

=== Rail transportation ===
The Interurbano Line operated by Incofer goes through this district.
