= Santo Domingo District, Santa Bárbara =

District in Santa Bárbara canton, Heredia province, Costa Rica

Santo Domingo
- District
- Santo Domingo district
- Santo Domingo district location in Costa Rica
- Coordinates: 10.1095184°N 84.1495206°W
- Country: Costa Rica
- Province: Heredia
- Canton: Santa Bárbara

Area
  - Total: 26.43 km^{2} (10.20 sq mi)
- Elevation: 1,396 m (4,580 ft)

Population (2011)
  - Total: 2,879
  - Density: 108.9/km^{2} (282.1/sq mi)
- Time zone: UTC−06:00
- Postal code: 40405

Santo Domingo is a district of the Santa Bárbara canton, in the Heredia province of Costa Rica.

== Geography ==
Santo Domingo has an area of 26.43 km² and an elevation of 1,396 metres.

== Demographics ==
Historical population
Census	Pop.	±% p.a.
1883	171	—
1892	303	+6.56%
1927	999	+3.47%
1950	1,311	+1.19%
1963	2,590	+5.38%
1973	2,931	+1.24%
1984	1,816	−4.26%
2000	2,647	+2.38%
2011	2,879	+0.77%
2022	3,308	+1.27%
Source: Instituto Nacional de Estadística y Censos; Centro Centroamericano de Población

For the 2011 census, Santo Domingo had a population of 2,879 inhabitants.

== Transportation ==
=== Road transportation ===
The district is covered by the following road routes:

- National Route 126
