= Barva (district) =

District in Barva canton, Heredia province, Costa Rica

- District
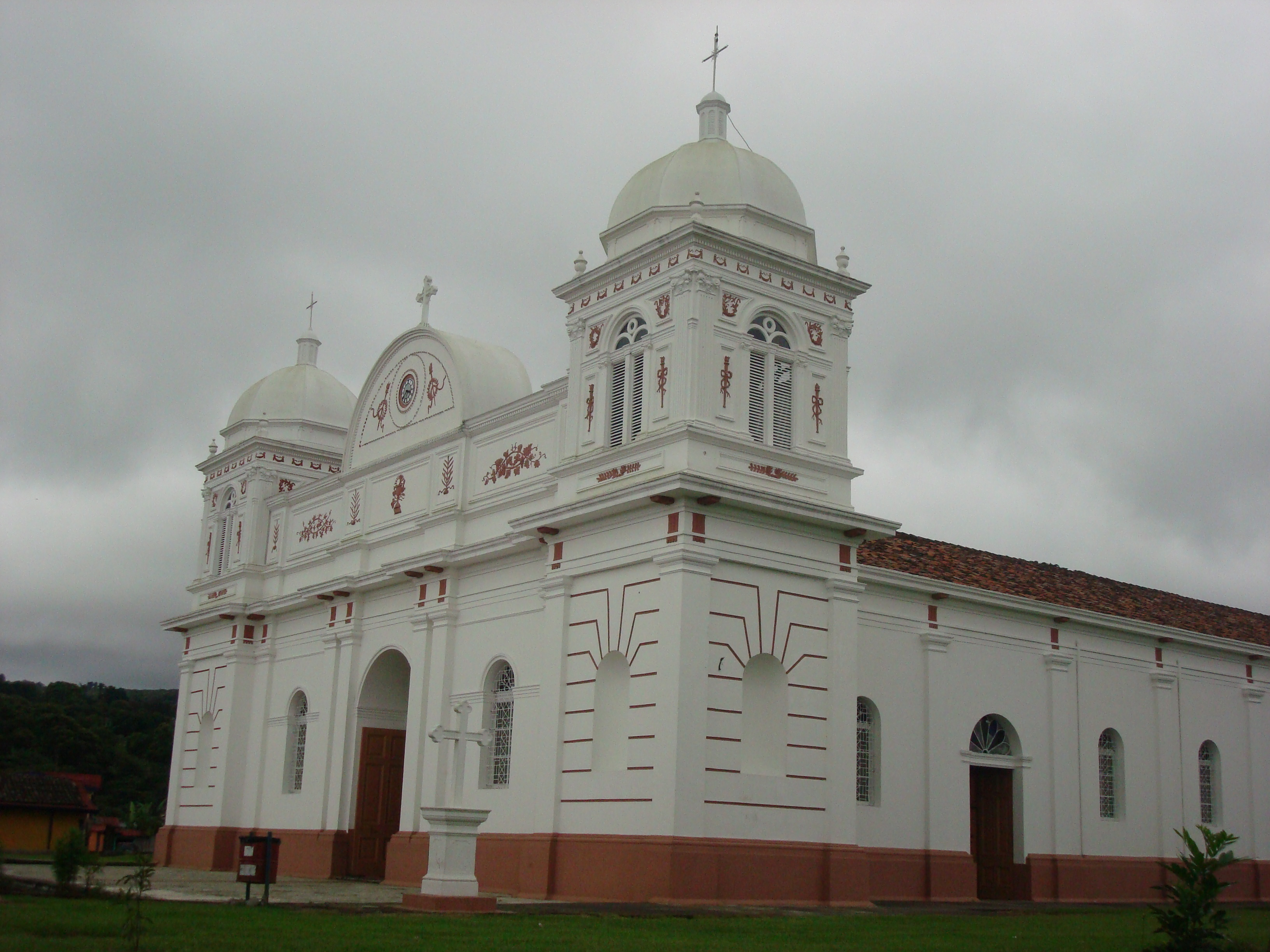
- Barva Church
- Interactive map of Barva
- Barva district location in Costa Rica
- Coordinates: 10.0203917°N 84.1233912°W
- Country: Costa Rica
- Province: Heredia
- Canton: Barva

Area
  - Total: 0.82 km^{2} (0.32 sq mi)
- Elevation: 1,176 m (3,858 ft)

Population (2011)
  - Total: 4,997
  - Density: 6,100/km^{2} (16,000/sq mi)
- Time zone: UTC−06:00
- Postal code: 40201
- Climate: Am

Barva is a district of the Barva canton, in the Heredia province of Costa Rica. The city is known for having a nice mix of rural and metropolitan landscape.

== Toponymy ==
The name comes from Barvac or Barvak a cacique of the area around 1569, which in turn might come from either:

- From New Tlapallan in Nahuatl language, or Tla pallapan, which in Huetar language was Tabaraba or Abaraba, hispanicized as Barba and meaning Black River or Dark River as explained by José Fidel Tristán in 1910.
- Bal (town) and wac (anteater), meaning Anteater Town, according to Luis Ferrero.
- Bar or bur (bees) with ba or bac (tribe), meaning Bees Tribe, as explained by bishop Bernardo Augusto Thiel y Hoffmann in late 19th century, from sources from 1575 and 1599.

By Decree 188 of 4 October 1974, the name changes from Barba to Barva.

== Geography ==
Barva has an area of 0.82 km² and an elevation of 1,176 metres.

It is located 3 km north of Heredia.

== Culture ==
=== Patron saint and mask festival ===
The patron saint of the town is Saint Bartholomew. A large church, Iglesia de San Bartolomé de Barva, was established between 1568 and 1575 is in Barva. Every year on August 24, the people of the town have a celebration dedicated to the saint, and the highlight of the celebration is the unique masquerade, where people go out wearing masks and hit others with cow and pig bladders.

== Demographics ==
Historical population
Census	Pop.	±% p.a.
1864	708	—
1883	1,057	+2.13%
1892	912	−1.63%
1927	831	−0.27%
1950	1,116	+1.29%
1963	1,938	+4.34%
1973	3,131	+4.91%
1984	3,911	+2.04%
2000	4,890	+1.41%
2011	4,997	+0.20%
2022	4,419	−1.11%
Source: Instituto Nacional de Estadística y Censos; Centro Centroamericano de Población

For the 2011 census, Barva had a population of 4,997 inhabitants.

== Transportation ==
=== Road transportation ===
The district is covered by the following road routes:

- National Route 119
- National Route 126

== Notable people ==
- Bernardo Rodríguez y Alfaro
