= National Route 114 (Costa Rica) =

National Road Route in Costa Rica

National Secondary Route 114
- Ruta nacional secundaria 114

Route information
- Maintained by Ministry of Public Works and Transport
- Length: 15.825 km (9.833 mi)

Location
- Country: Costa Rica
- Provinces: Heredia

Highway system
- National Road Network of Costa Rica
← Route 113	→ Route 115

National Secondary Route 114, or just Route 114 (Spanish: Ruta Nacional Secundaria 114, or Ruta 114) is a National Road Route of Costa Rica, located in the Heredia province.

== Description ==
In Heredia province the route covers Barva canton (San Pablo, San José de la Montaña districts) and Santa Bárbara canton (Jesús district).
