= National Route 128 (Costa Rica) =

National Road Route in Costa Rica

National Secondary Route 128
- Ruta nacional secundaria 128

Route information
- Maintained by Ministry of Public Works and Transport
- Length: 5.230 km (3.250 mi)

Location
- Country: Costa Rica
- Provinces: Heredia

Highway system
- National Road Network of Costa Rica
← Route 127	→ Route 129

National Secondary Route 128, or just Route 128 (Spanish: Ruta Nacional Secundaria 128, or Ruta 128) is a National Road Route of Costa Rica located in the Heredia province.

== Description ==
In Heredia province the route covers Barva canton (San Pedro, San Pablo, and San Roque districts) and Santa Bárbara canton (Santa Bárbara and Jesús districts).
