= Santa Bárbara (canton) =

Canton in Heredia province, Costa Rica

- Canton
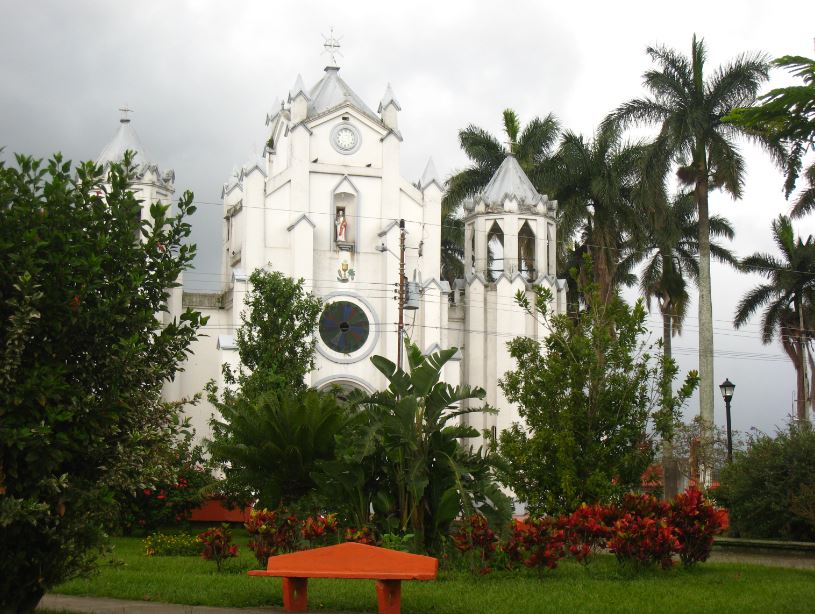
- Central Church, City of Santa Bárbara, Santa Bárbara Cantón

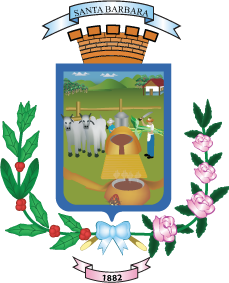
- Flag Seal
- Santa Bárbara canton
- Santa Bárbara canton location in Costa Rica
- Coordinates: 10.0819939°N 84.1473773°W
- Country: Costa Rica
- Province: Heredia
- Creation: 29 September 1882
- Head city: Santa Bárbara
- Districts: Districts: Santa Bárbara; San Pedro; San Juan; Jesús; Santo Domingo; Purabá

Government
  - Type: Municipality
  - Body: Municipalidad de Santa Bárbara

Area
  - Total: 53.21 km^{2} (20.54 sq mi)
- Elevation: 1,177 m (3,862 ft)

Population (2011 Census)
  - Total: 36,243
  - Density: 681.1/km^{2} (1,764/sq mi)
- Time zone: UTC−06:00
- Canton code: 404
- Website: www.santabarbara.go.cr

Santa Bárbara is a canton in the Heredia province of Costa Rica. The head city is in Santa Bárbara district.

== History ==
Santa Bárbara was created on 29 September 1882 by decree 21.

Santa Bárbara was originally populated by the Huetares, who lived in the Barva region. When the Spanish settled, the Huetares were forced to work on Spanish haciendas where many crops were produced, including corn, beans, legumes, cotton, sugarcane, and sarsaparilla.

While looking for an outlet to the Caribbean Sea, Joaquín Mora Fernández (not to be confused with the future president), conducted the first documented European explorations of the area. Mora Fernández established a base within the general area of the canton.

The first haciendas in the area are dated to January 19, 1663, when Joseph Sandoval Ocampo, among others, was given a farming and pasture concession from the capital city of Cartago.

By the time Alajuela was founded in 1782, the present district of San Pedro, which were then collectively called Targuás or Targuases, are mentioned. At the time, there were seventy-six men and sixteen women in Targuás.

The name of the San Pedro district name is mentioned in 1819, according to a government document that states Juan Pablo Lara purchased land in the district on which to build a home and a farm.

Two years later, Churruca (also known as Surruco) is mentioned in documents from 1821. Churruca was the name of the Santa Bárbara canton before it took the current name.

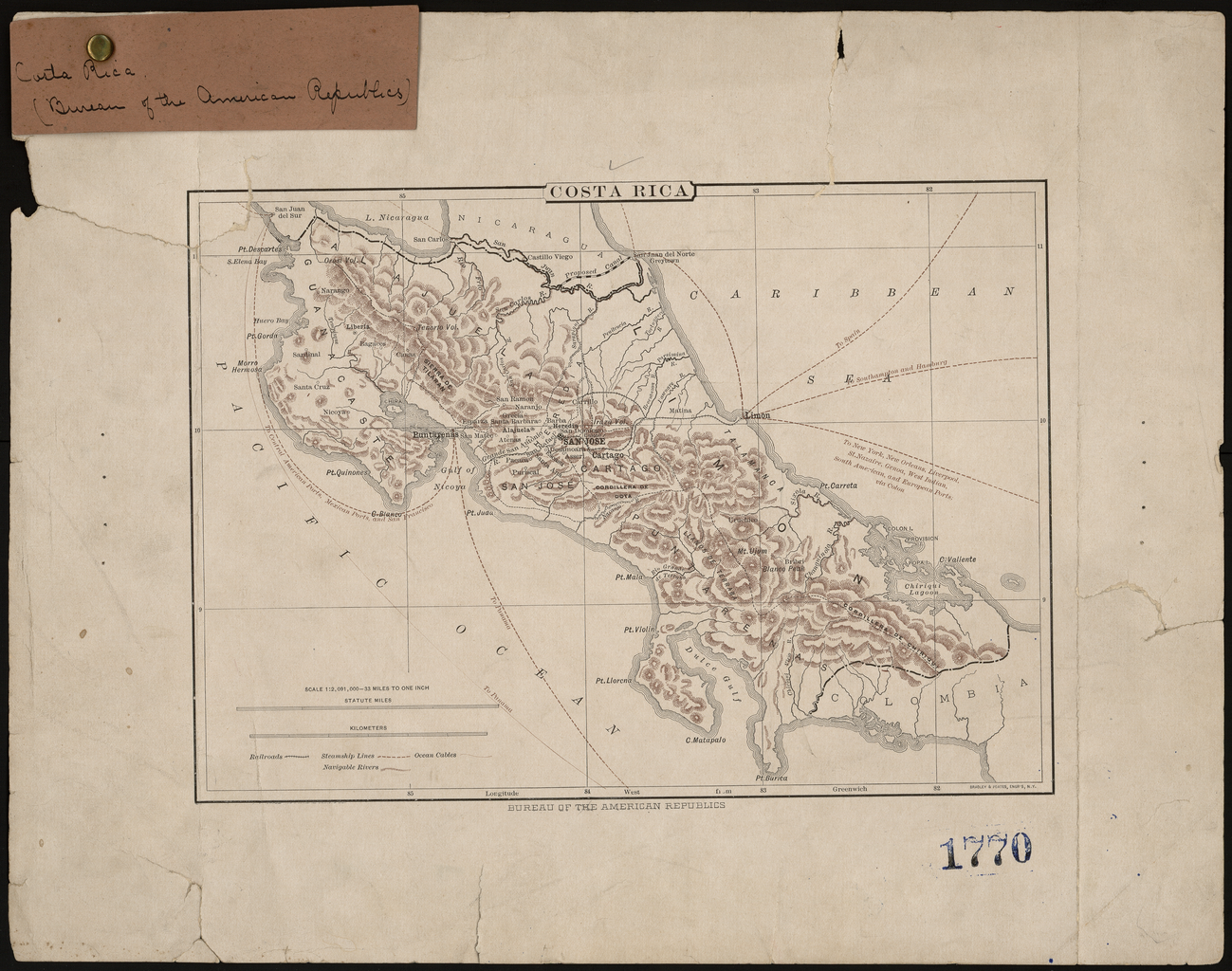
Santa Bárbara on an 1890 map of Costa Rica

According to a local legend, Santa Bárbara was chosen for the region's patron saint because a resident bought an image of Saint Barbara from a Franciscan and made an altar in her home. During a terrible rainy season in Santa Bárbara, Saint Barbara heard the prayers of the resident. Little by little, her neighbors became convinced of that Saint Barbara was answering her prayers.

The canton was established by a government resolution of October 3, 1855.

Some of the early residents of Santa Bárbara include Ambrose Arias, Juan Cortez, Andres Murillo, Gregory Cuadra, Salvador Sanchez, Jose Maria Palma, Juan Bastos, Victorio Cortes, Joaquin Gutierrez, Jose Angel Sanchez, Jose Dolores Gonzalez and Diego Murillo.

It is unknown when coffee production began in Santa Bárbara. Shortly after 1842, resident Víctor Aguilar started the first coffee farm in the canton at "El Paso del Guayabo" ("Guayabo Steps"), followed by José Zamora in the Porrosati River lowlands. The first harvests were processed in San Joaquín, and it soon became the most important crop of the canton.

By 1846, there were four major districts of Santa Bárbara. There were 1,500 residents, with 1,000 living in San Pedro. In 1854, the site of the first church was chosen because it was in the center of the four major areas. The first church is presumed to have been located two blocks south of where the current Santa Bárbara Church is.

The most infamous resident of Santa Bárbara, where he was born and later died, was Beltrán Dalay Cortés Carvajal. Cortés Carvajal murdered two doctors who had performed a surgery on him ten years before.

== Geography ==
Santa Bárbara has an area of 53.21 km^{2} and a mean elevation of 1,177 metres.

The elongated canton begins midway between the cities of Alajuela and Heredia, where the Segundo River marks its southern boundary. It climbs through foothills northward to the Desengaño River high in the Cordillera Central (Central Mountain Range).

=== Geology ===
The Santa Bárbara cantón is constructed largely of volcanic rock from the Holocene Period of the Cenozoic Era. The fluvial system of Santa Bárbara generally flows toward the Pacific Ocean via the Grande de Tárcoles River river basin. The Santa Bárbara cantón forms part of the larger Origen Volcánico geomorphic region, including the sub-units of Barva Volcano and the Central Valley's Relleno Volcánico.

== Districts ==
The canton of Santa Bárbara is subdivided into the following districts:

1. Santa Bárbara
2. San Pedro
3. San Juan
4. Jesús
5. Santo Domingo
6. Purabá

== Demographics ==
Historical population
Census	Pop.	±% p.a.
1883	2,449	—
1892	2,845	+1.68%
1927	3,997	+0.98%
1950	5,044	+1.02%
1963	8,127	+3.74%
1973	10,738	+2.83%
1984	16,643	+4.06%
2000	29,181	+3.57%
2011	36,243	+1.99%
2022	39,133	+0.70%
Source: Instituto Nacional de Estadística y Censos; Centro Centroamericano de Población

For the 2011 census, Santa Bárbara had a population of 36,243 inhabitants.

Jesús was the most populous district with 8,791 residents. 58% of the population lived in areas marked as rural, while 42% lived in urban areas. 15% of residents seeking employment were unemployed, while 68% of residents worked in agriculture.

Population growth has placed strains on infrastructure, such as the quality of roads. Should its population growth continue, the canton is expected to have a population of 41,725 in 2030.

The canton has one of the highest standards of living in country as determined by the Human Development Index. The same index, however, ranks Santa Bárbara as one of the twenty least secure cantons.

According to the United Nations, Santa Bárbara has a literacy rate of 98.4. 100% of elementary-age children and 74.8% of secondary-age children are enrolled in school.

== Education and community organizations ==
Within the canton of Santa Bárbara, there are many different community service organizations. Such groups include a Red Cross committee, nine Alcoholics Anonymous groups, six sports committees, twelve local health committees, nine local church committees, a Lions Clubs International branch, a public library, and organizations for senior citizens. In addition, the Municipality and Ministry of Health maintain community outreach programs.

Within the canton, there are fifteen public and three private elementary schools. There are three high schools, including Liceo de Santa Bárbara, and Liceo el Roble.

Like most of Costa Rica, the church with the largest following is the Catholic Church. There are numerous churches within the district, organized by Eucharistic communities, reading groups, youth groups, and so forth. In addition, there are several Protestant churches, including two churches for Jehovah's Witnesses.

== Sports ==
=== Athletics ===
The municipality recently funded a professional athletics team led by Edrey Campos with over 300 active students and formal equipment. The team has qualified to National Selection.

=== Soccer ===
Santa Bárbara has an active sporting community. Beginning in 1943, Club Sport Barbareño represented Santa Bárbara in the first division of the national soccer league. The team changed its name to Asociación Deportiva Barbareña (Bárbara Sports Association) in 1984. The team plays within the national Costa Rican soccer hierarchy. Between 1962 and 1975, it was a third division team. Between 1975 and 1981, as well as 1993 and 1997, it was a second division team. Between 1997 and 2004, it was a first division team. It currently plays in the third division at the Carlos Alvarado Villalobos Stadium in Santa Bárbara, which holds 1,500 spectators.

Another team from San Pedro de Santa Bárbara, Asociación Deportiva Fraternidad de Santa Bárbara, played within the third and second divisions beginning in 1947 until its disintegration in the late 1990s.

=== Volleyball ===
The municipality is also home to the Asociación Deportiva Barbareña de Voleibol (ASBAVOL) (Santa Bárbara Volleyball Sports Association), one of the country's most successful volleyball clubs. The clube began in 1992, winning numerous championships and tournaments in different categories. ASBAVOL players regularly join the Costa Rica women's national volleyball team.

== Transportation ==
=== Road transportation ===
The canton is covered by the following road routes:

- National Route 114
- National Route 119
- National Route 123
- National Route 126
- National Route 127
- National Route 128
