= Sarapiquí, Alajuela =

Sarapiquí
- District
- Sarapiquí district
- Sarapiquí district location in Costa Rica
- Coordinates: 10.2966077°N 84.1962544°W
- Country: Costa Rica
- Province: Alajuela
- Canton: Alajuela

Area
  - Total: 113.98 km^{2} (44.01 sq mi)
- Elevation: 510 m (1,670 ft)

Population (2011)
  - Total: 2,842
  - Density: 24.93/km^{2} (64.58/sq mi)
- Time zone: UTC−06:00
- Postal code: 20114

Sarapiquí is the name of the district number 14 of the canton of Alajuela, that in turn belongs to the province of Alajuela in Costa Rica.

Because it borders on the canton of Sarapiquí, it is often confused with the latter.

== History ==
Sarapiquí was created on 6 November 1922 by Decree 28.

== Location ==
The district of Sarapiquí, is located in the northern region of the country and borders the canton of Sarapiquí to the east, Río Cuarto to the northwest, Sarchí to the west, and the district of Sabanilla de Alajuela to the south.

Its head, the picturesque and rural village of San Miguel, is located 51 km (1 hour 30 minutes) north of the city of Alajuela and 67.9 km (1 hour 52 minutes) north of San José, the nation's capital .

The nearest towns to San Miguel are Río Cuarto (city), La Virgen de Sarapiquí (village) and Cariblanco (village).

== Geography ==
Sarapiquí has an area of 113.98 km^{2}, which makes it the largest district of the canton by area. and an elevation of 510 metres.

It presents a mountainous relief in the majority of its territory.

== Demographics ==
Historical population
Census	Pop.	±% p.a.
1864	1,812	—
1892	167	−8.16%
1927	118	−0.99%
1963	1,898	+8.02%
1973	1,587	−1.77%
1984	1,767	+0.98%
2000	2,493	+2.17%
2011	2,842	+1.20%
2022	3,310	+1.40%
Source: Instituto Nacional de Estadística y Censos; Centro Centroamericano de Población

For the 2011 census, Sarapiquí had a population of 2,842 inhabitants.

== Transportation ==
=== Road transportation ===
The district is covered by the following road routes:

- National Route 126
- National Route 140

== Settlements ==
The 11 population centers of the district are:

San Miguel (header) Bajo Latas Cariblanco Cinchona Corazón de Jesús Isla Bonita San Antonio Paraíso Punta Mala Ujarrás Virgen del Socorro (part)

== Economy ==
The economy is mainly based on agriculture and livestock.

In the town of San Miguel de Sarapiquí, financial and health services (Ebais) are offered, both state.

The trade is represented by stores selling groceries, among others.

== See also ==
- List of districts of Costa Rica
