= National Route 119 (Costa Rica) =

National Road Route in Costa Rica

National Secondary Route 119
- Ruta nacional secundaria 119

Route information
- Maintained by Ministry of Public Works and Transport
- Length: 6.975 km (4.334 mi)

Location
- Country: Costa Rica
- Provinces: Alajuela, Heredia

Highway system
- National Road Network of Costa Rica
← Route 118	→ Route 120

National Secondary Route 119, or just Route 119 (Spanish: Ruta Nacional Secundaria 119, or Ruta 119) is a National Road Route of Costa Rica located in the Alajuela and Heredia provinces.

== Description ==
In Alajuela province the route covers Alajuela canton (Río Segundo district).

In Heredia province the route covers Barva canton (Barva, San Roque districts), Santa Bárbara canton (San Juan district), and Flores canton (Barrantes district).
