= Parroquia San Bartolomé Apóstol (Barva) =

Church in Barva, Heredia, Costa Rica

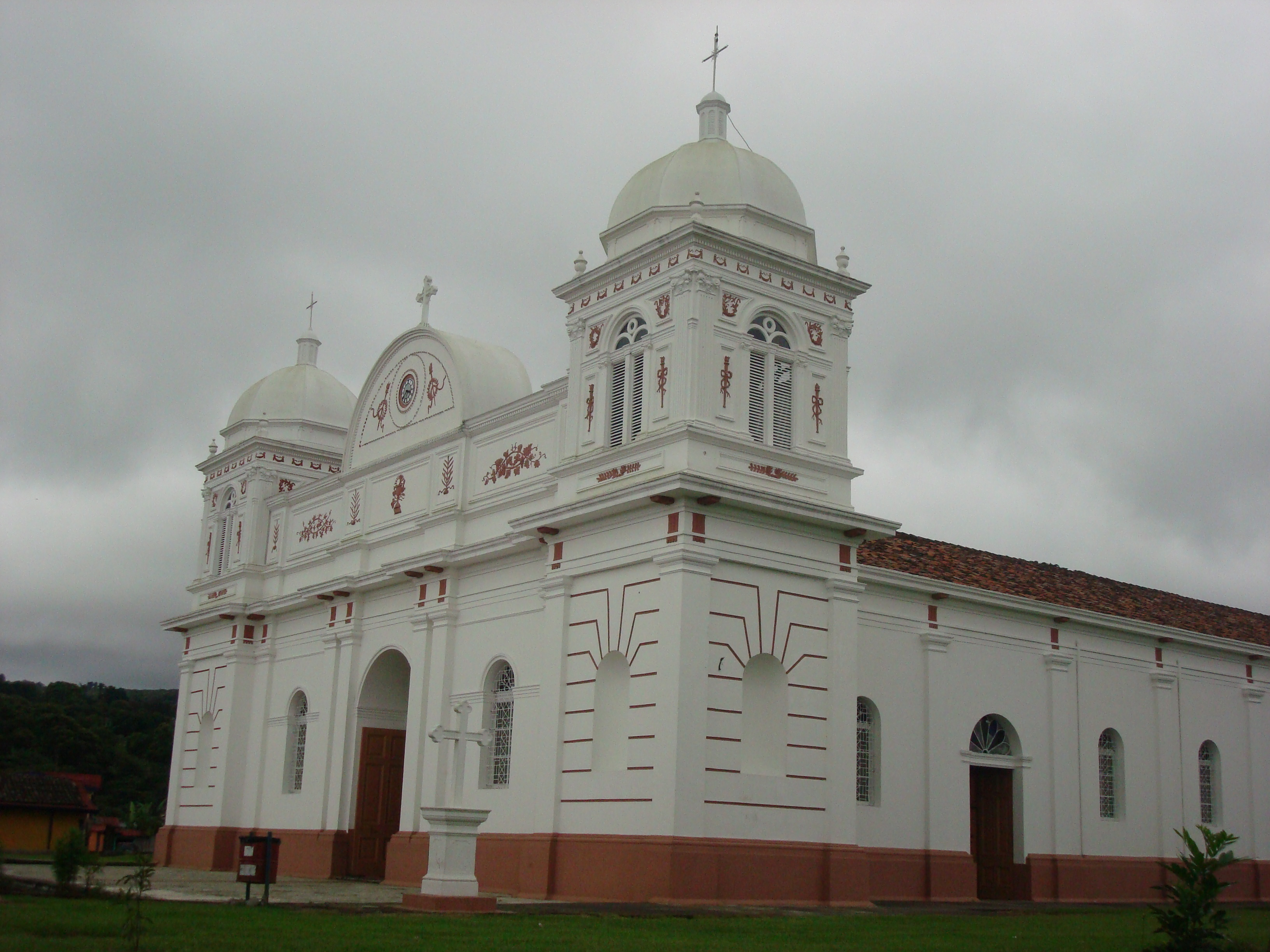

Religion
- Affiliation: Roman Catholic
- Ecclesiastical or organisational status: Parish church
- Year consecrated: 1568

Location
- Location: Costa Rica
- Interactive map of Parroquia San Bartolomé Apóstol
- Coordinates: 10°01′15″N 84°7′24″W

Architecture
- Style: Spanish Baroque
- Groundbreaking: 1867
- Completed: 1893

The Parroquia San Bartolomé Apóstol (Parish of Saint Bartholomew the Apostle), is a church in Barva, Heredia, Costa Rica. The first church was established between 1568 and 1575, and dedicated to Saint Bartholomew; it is rumored to have been built on an indigenous burial ground.

In 1613 a more permanent Franciscan mission and convent was established to convert the native Cot, Quircot, and Tobosí people; at this time, the church was rededicated to the Assumption of the Virgin, to remain its patron until 1888.

In 1681, governor Miguel Gómez de Lara began on a new temple, also built of adobe, which was completed in 1693. On 15 February 1772, an earthquake destroyed the convent and severely damaged the old church; however, it stood to the north of the current temple until it finally collapsed in an earthquake on 12 December 1888.

In 1793, Barva was granted an independent parish. Construction of the current temple began in 1867, with the cornerstone laid by Monsignor Joaquín Anselmo Llorente, the first Bishop of Costa Rica; however, construction was halted by the 1888 earthquake which finally destroyed the old church.

The temple was finally consecrated on 11 August 1893 by Bernardo Thiel Hoffman, the German-born second Bishop of Costa Rica, and re-dedicated back to Saint Bartholomew.

Every year on 24 August, the people of the town have a celebration dedicated to the saint, and the highlight of the celebration is the unique masquerade, where people go out wearing masks and hit others with pig and cow bladders.
