= Flores (canton) =

Canton in Heredia province, Costa Rica

- Canton
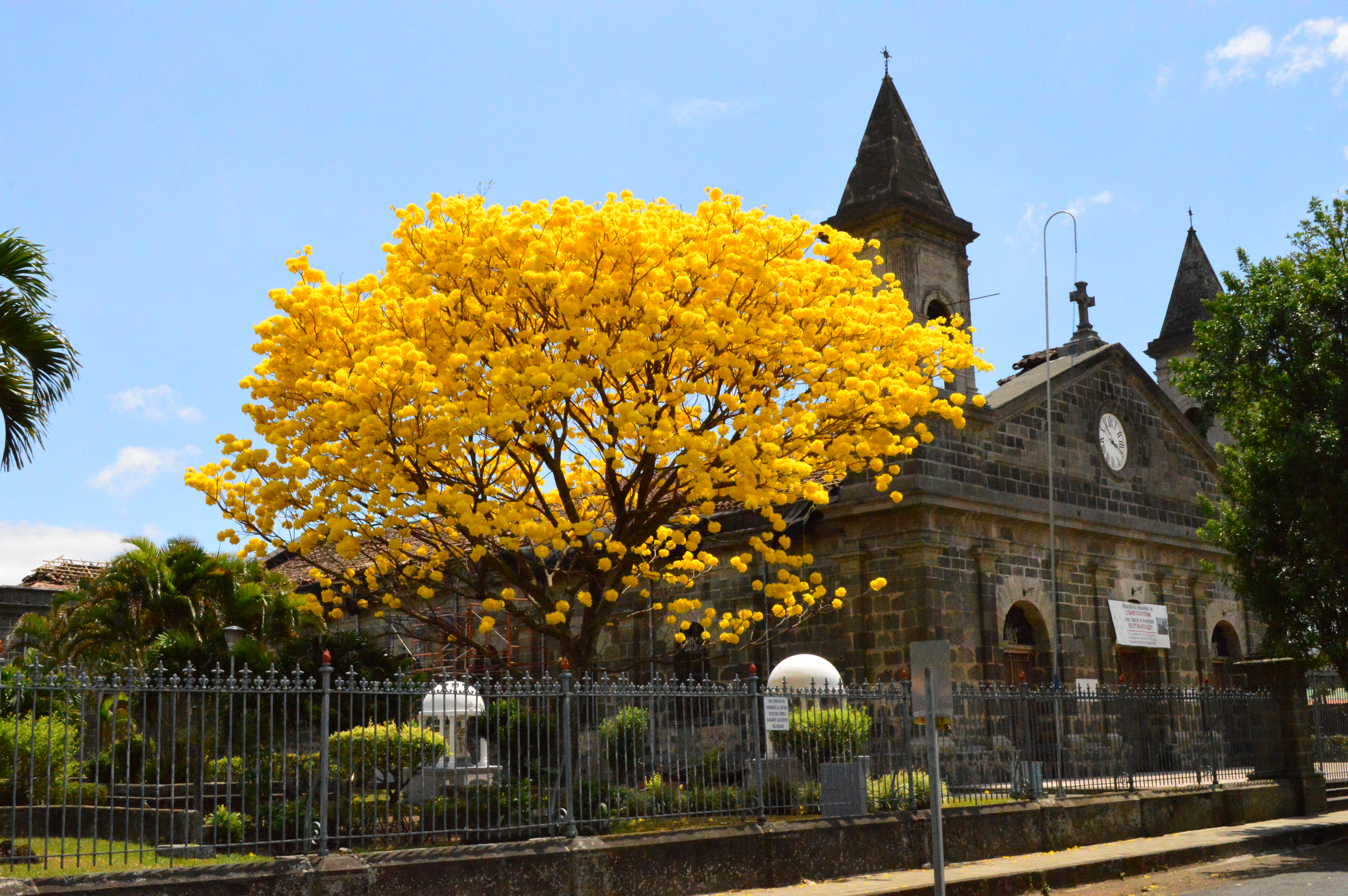
- Church in San Joaquín, Flores

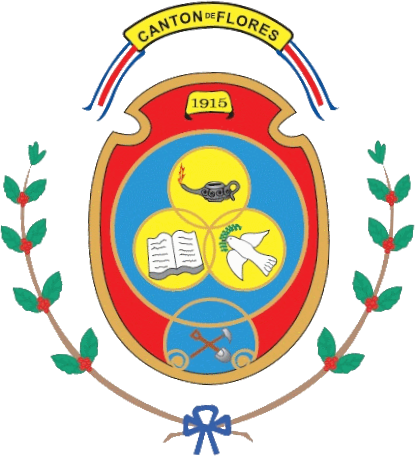
- Flag Seal
- Interactive map of Flores
- Flores canton location in Costa Rica
- Coordinates: 10.0058345°N 84.1538838°W
- Country: Costa Rica
- Province: Heredia
- Creation: 12 August 1915
- Head city: San Joaquín
- Districts: Districts: San Joaquín; Barrantes; Llorente

Government
  - Type: Municipality
  - Body: Municipalidad de Flores

Area
  - Total: 6.96 km^{2} (2.69 sq mi)
- Elevation: 1,086 m (3,563 ft)

Population (2011)
  - Total: 20,037
  - Density: 2,880/km^{2} (7,460/sq mi)
- Time zone: UTC−06:00
- Canton code: 408
- Website: flores.go.cr

Flores is a canton in the Heredia province of Costa Rica. The head city is in San Joaquín district.

== History ==
Flores was created on 12 August 1915 by decree 52.

== Geography ==
Flores has an area of 6.96 km^{2} (2.69 sq mi) and a mean elevation of 1,086 metres.

The compact canton is located between the provincial capital cities of Alajuela and Heredia, with the Segundo River forming the northwestern boundary and the Burío River establishing the canton's southwestern border.

== Districts ==
The canton of Flores is subdivided into the following districts:

1. San Joaquín
2. Barrantes
3. Llorente

== Demographics ==
Historical population
| Census | Pop. | ±% p.a. |
|---|---|---|
| 1927 | 2,483 | — |
| 1950 | 2,880 | +0.65% |
| 1963 | 4,162 | +2.87% |
| 1973 | 6,524 | +4.60% |
| 1984 | 9,015 | +2.98% |
| 2000 | 15,038 | +3.25% |
| 2011 | 20,037 | +2.64% |
| 2022 | 22,026 | +0.86% |
Source: Instituto Nacional de Estadística y Censos; Centro Centroamericano de Población

For the 2011 census, Flores had a population of 20,037 inhabitants.

== Transportation ==
=== Road transportation ===
The canton is covered by the following road routes:

- National Route 3
- National Route 119
- National Route 123
- National Route 129

=== Rail transportation ===
The Interurbano Line operated by Incofer goes through this canton.
