= Greater Metropolitan Area (Costa Rica) =

Greater Metropolitan Area Gran Área Metropolitana
- Conurbation
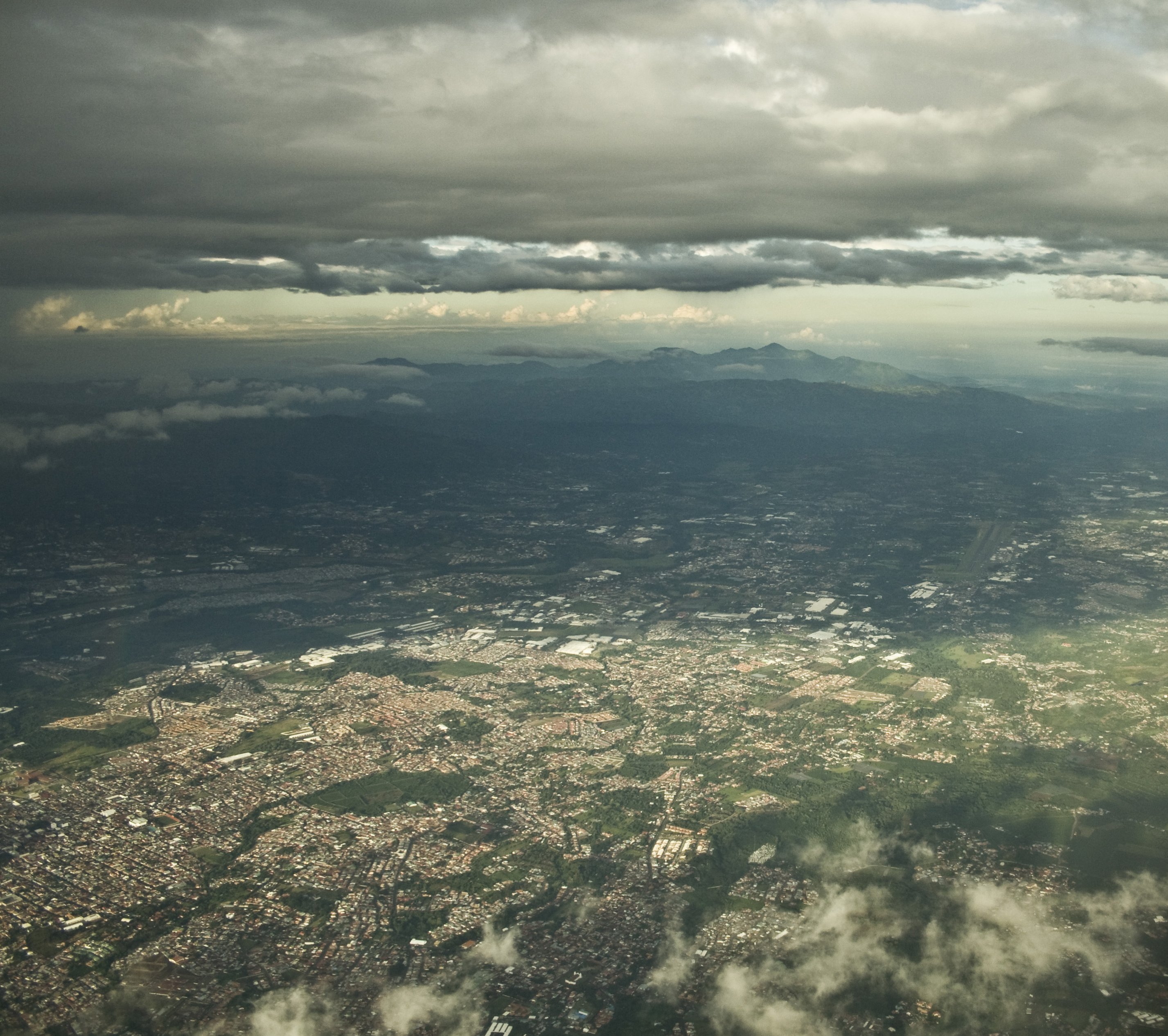
- View of the Greater Metropolitan Area facing east
Interactive Map of San José Metropolitan Area
City of San José / Ciudad de San José
San José Metro Area / Zona Metropolitana
- Coordinates: 9.933°N 84.083°W
- Country: Costa Rica
- Province(s): San José; Alajuela; Cartago; Heredia

Area
  - Total: 2,044 km^{2} (789 sq mi)
- Elevation: 1,100 m (3,600 ft)

Population (2019)
  - Total: 3,160,000
- Time zone: UTC-6

The Greater Metropolitan Area of Costa Rica (Spanish: Gran Área Metropolitana, GAM) is the largest urban agglomeration in the country, comprising areas of high population density surrounding the capital, San José, which geographically corresponds to the Central Valley and extended to include the Guarco Valley, where some of the cantons of the Cartago province are located.

The proper definition and delimitation corresponds to the National Institute of Statistics and Census of Costa Rica (INEC) and could vary over time. According to the 2011 census, the GAM had a population of 3.1 million inhabitants (about 60% of Costa Rica's population) in an area of 2,044 km² (3.84% of the country's area).

== General definition ==
Since colonial times, Costa Rica's Central Valley has housed a significant share of the population in less than a tenth of the country's total area. On this plateau lies three of the seven provincial seats, including the capital, San José. Throughout the years, a strong immigration stream spurred by the uneven economic opportunities and a growing job demand helped to expand these urban cores and to develop new residential areas in former agricultural lands.

The Greater Metropolitan Area has an area of 1,779 square kilometres (687 mi^{2}) composed of the Central Valley and Guarco Valley, partially covering the four provinces of San José, Alajuela, Cartago, and Heredia, and the following cantons (some partially by including only some of their districts):

- San José province (13 cantons):
  - San José
  - Escazú
  - Desamparados
  - Aserrí
  - Mora
  - Goicoechea
  - Santa Ana
  - Alajuelita
  - Vázquez de Coronado
  - Tibás
  - Moravia
  - Montes de Oca
  - Curridabat
- Alajuela province (3 cantons):
  - Alajuela
  - Atenas
  - Poás
- Cartago province (6 cantons):
  - Cartago
  - Paraíso
  - La Unión
  - Alvarado
  - Oreamuno
  - El Guarco
- Heredia province (9 cantons):
  - Heredia
  - Barva
  - Santo Domingo
  - Santa Bárbara
  - San Rafael
  - San Isidro
  - Belén
  - Flores
  - San Pablo
