= San Pedro de Santa Bárbara =

District in Santa Bárbara canton, Heredia province, Costa Rica

San Pedro
- District
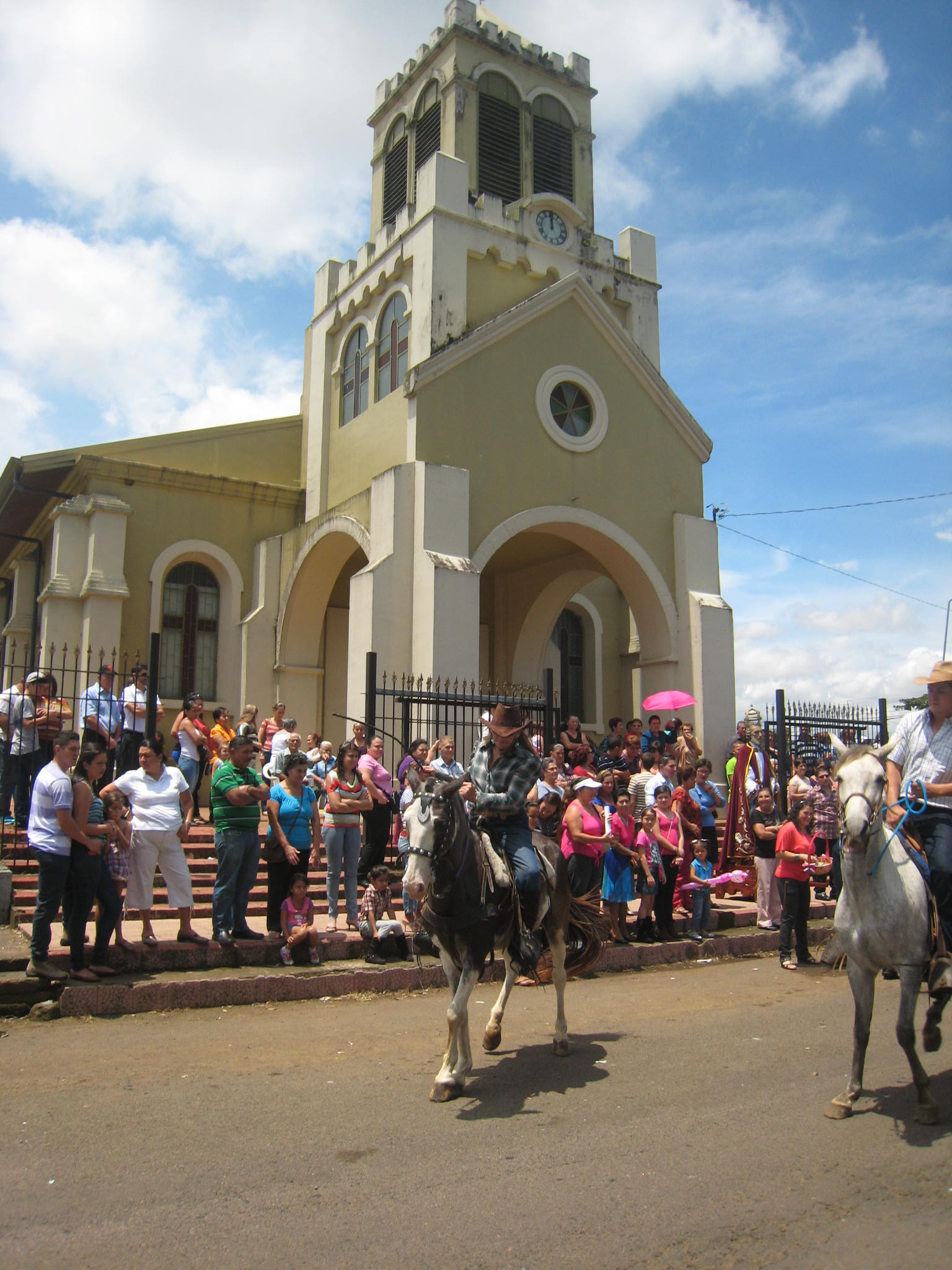
- San Pedro Church
- San Pedro district
- San Pedro district location in Costa Rica
- Coordinates: 10.0289858°N 84.1674852°W
- Country: Costa Rica
- Province: Heredia
- Canton: Santa Bárbara

Area
  - Total: 2.48 km^{2} (0.96 sq mi)
- Elevation: 1,080 m (3,540 ft)

Population (2011)
  - Total: 5,582
  - Density: 2,250/km^{2} (5,830/sq mi)
- Demonym: San Pedreños
- Time zone: UTC−06:00
- Postal code: 40402
- Climate: Am

San Pedro, is one of the six districts of the Santa Bárbara canton, in the Heredia province of Costa Rica. It is located 2.5 kilometers (1.6 mi) west of Santa Bárbara and is officially a part of the province of Heredia. The elevation is approximately 1,080 meters (3,540 ft) above sea-level.

== Toponymy ==
Named after Saint Peter.

== History ==
When Alajuela Province was founded in 1782, the region of San Pedro was mentioned in the founding documents as Targúás (alternatively noted as Targuas). The population was fewer than one hundred residents. By 1813, the In 1819, Juan Pablo Lara bought land that was registered in Alajuela, and San Pedro's name first appears in those documents.

By 1846, San Pedro was the most populous of Santa Bárbara's current districts, with 1,000 residents. In order to pray to Santa Bárbara, San Pedro's residents met with other settlers in the area at a central location close to the current site of Santa Bárbara's plaza, hence the name of the city. In 1852, resident Pedro Saborío suggested that a Catholic church be constructed. San Pedro was mentioned as one of the possible locations; however, because the surrounding communities all contributed, the location of the church was kept near the central meeting place in Santa Bárbara.

Between 1924 and 1928, the first running water pipes were installed in parts of San Pedro.

== Economy and politics ==
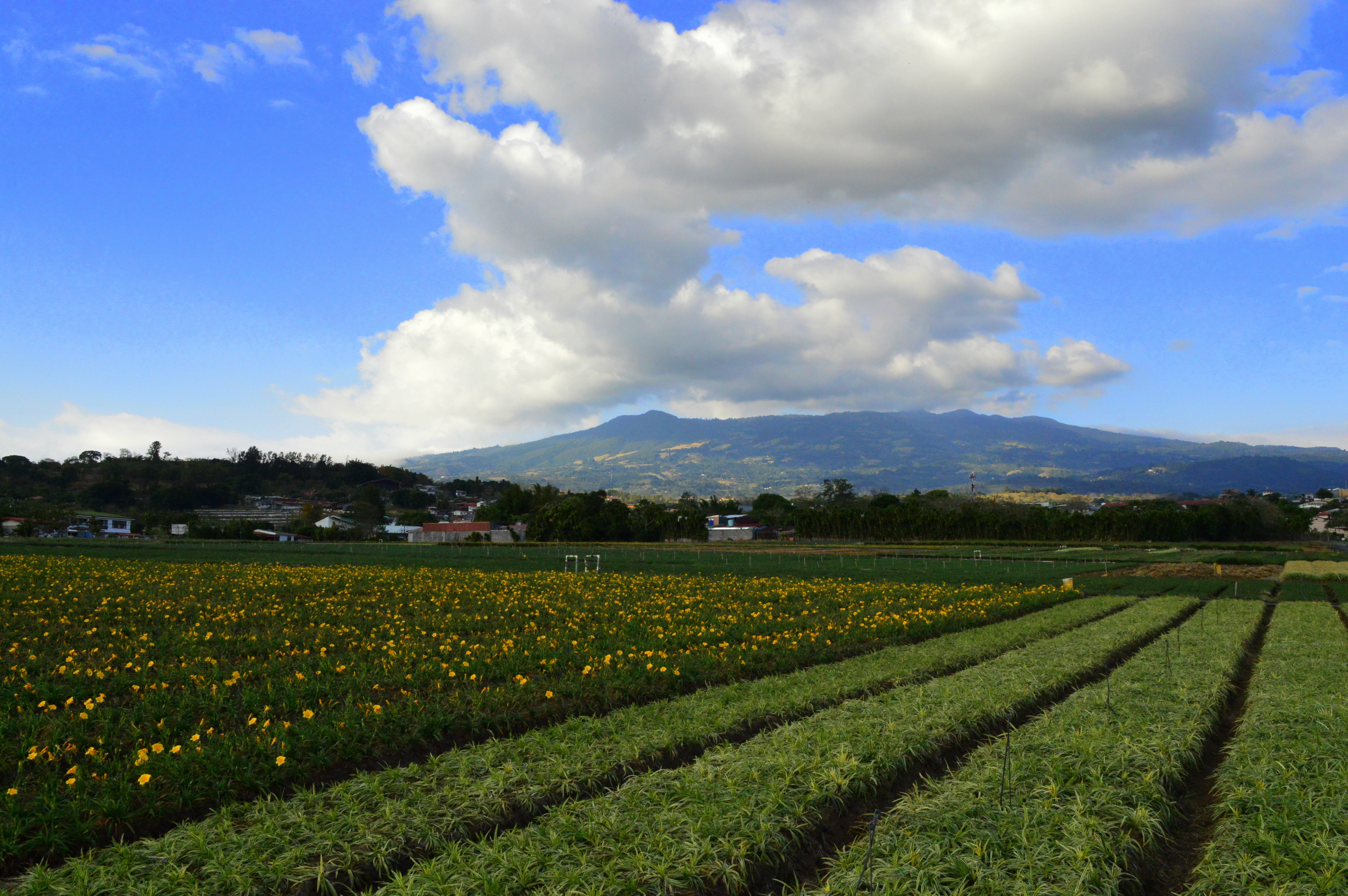
San Pedro de Santa Bárbara

San Pedro is largely an agricultural community whose main crop continues to be coffee. In 1973, San Pedro was producing nearly 700,000 kilograms of coffee per year with a population of just over 1,500 people.

There are various commercial businesses in San Pedro, including small corner shops, restaurants, several mechanics shops, an outdoor market, and an indoor soccer field. For more than 70 years, the "Pulpería el Taconazo" ("Stingy Man's Corner Store") has been in San Pedro, making it one of the oldest corner shops in the entire canton. An EBAIS, Equipo Básico de Atención Integral en Salud (Basic Medical Care Center), is located in San Pedro, serving residents and non-residents of the district.

Among other goals, in 2010 the Santa Bárbara canton planned to shore up San Pedro's infrastructure. There are plans to improve the district's water quality and distribution with new sewers and protected wells. Additionally, the canton had plans to strengthen the outdoor farmers' market and improve access to microbusiness, especially for farmers and women.

Colombian ex-senator and presidential candidate Álvaro Leyva Durán lived in San Pedro for six years. Having fled his native Colombia, Leyva sought political asylum in Costa Rica. While in San Pedro, his assets were seized. He returned to Colombia after being absolved by the Supreme Court of Colombia.

== Culture ==
The Típico Copey is known throughout the Central Valley for its live music, typically held on Friday and Saturday evenings, as well as Sunday afternoons. It is named for the copey tree located on the south side of the central church.

San Pedro is mentioned in the poem "Poesía de Turno" ("Festival Poem") of 1900, as being a place of gathering. In addition, La Fundación Cultural Antidio Cabal (Antidio Cabal Cultural Foundation), which promotes the works of the Spanish poet and philosopher Antidio Cabal, is headquartered in San Pedro.

San Pedro is also home to Pastor, a Coca-Cola drinking Brahman cow. Pastor, who is valued at over $3,000USD, once drank 14 Coca-Cola bottles during a horse show in Alajuela.

Every year between late June and early July, San Pedro hosts a festival in honor of Saint Peter. The festival, which draws large crowds to the district, usually includes amusement rides, musical concerts, horse shows, and fireworks, as well as traditional Catholic activities, such as liturgical masses.

== Education ==
San Pedro is home to the Elisa Soto Jiménez Elementary School. The school was one of at least four schools in 2013 where parents threatened to block access to teachers who they deemed unqualified. Costa Rican former President Laura Chinchilla (2010-2014) made a trip to the Elisa Soto Jiménez Elementary School in 2011.

Students from San Pedro usually attend Liceo de Santa Bárbara High School, but may also go to the high schools in Alajuela. There are several private schools within the area that students may also attend.

== Sports ==
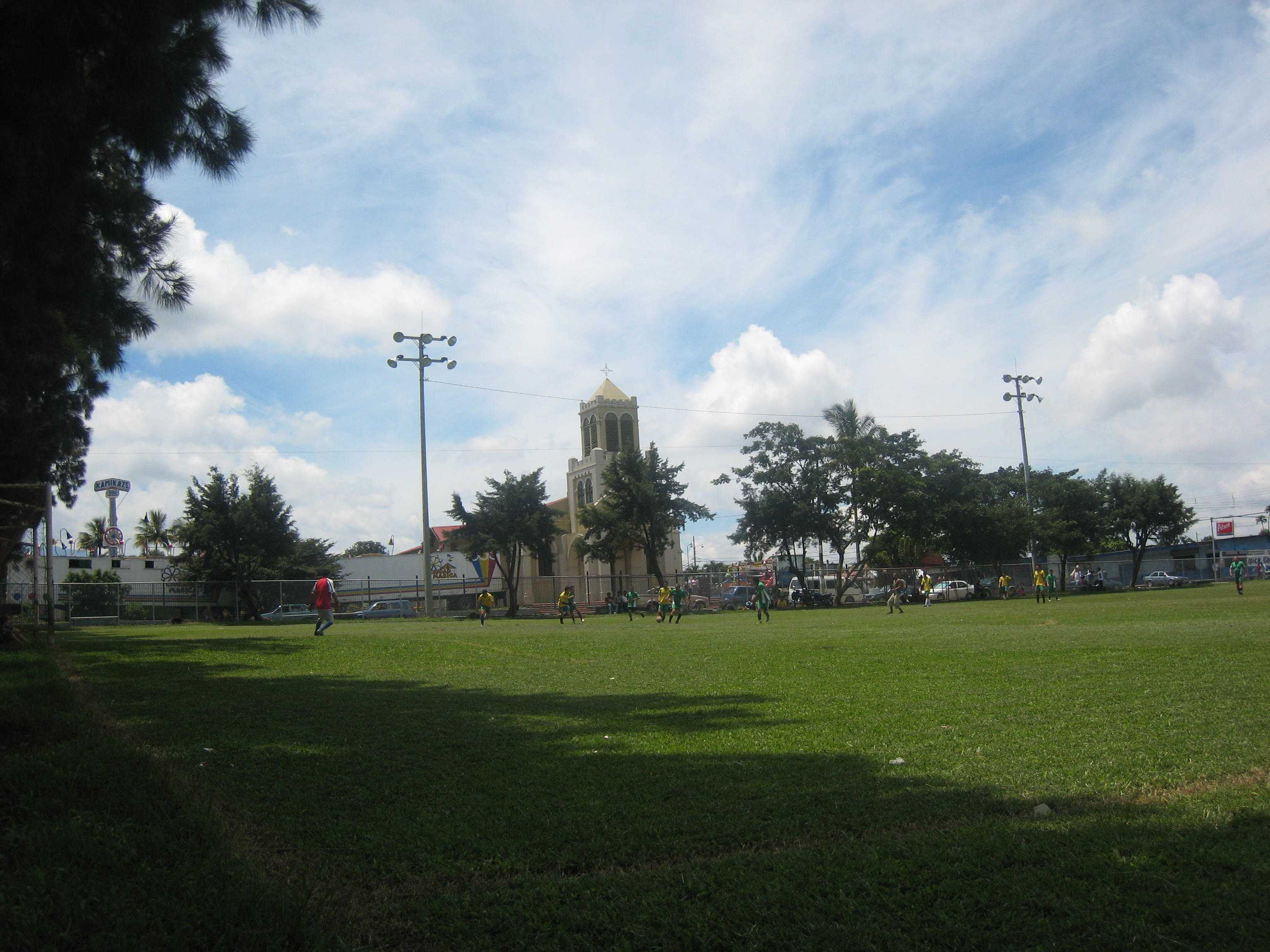
Soccer game in San Pedro de Santa Bárbara Plaza

Asociación Deportiva Fraternidad de Santa Bárbara was a San Pedro soccer club that existed in San Pedro beginning in 1947. It disappeared in the late 1990s. During its time, Asociación Deportiva Fraternidad played in the second and third divisions of FEDEFUT. One of the first players was San Pedro's own Pedro Sánchez Soto.

San Pedro is known nationally for its "Gordos y Flacos" ("Fatties versus Skinnies") soccer game. The annual game is held at the end of San Pedro's festivals, usually in late June. The first game was organized in 1975 by local Asociación Deportiva Fraternidad supporters. Because organizers wanted to raise money for the church, they decided against spending money on uniforms. Instead, to allow people to easily identify the two opposing teams, they came up with the idea of using fat players against skinny players. The game brings spectators and media from around the country to San Pedro.

In 2013, San Pedro hosted the Fútbol Estudiantil Categoria B ("Category B Student Football") Championship. The games were played in the Central Plaza in front of the church.

== Geography ==
San Pedro has an area of 2.48 km^{2} and an elevation of 1,080 metres.

San Pedro is located between Alajuela and Santa Bárbara along Route 123 (Calle Las Americas). San Pedro is in the Cordillera Central. Quebrada La Claudia, a small river, runs through San Pedro. Like many districts in Costa Rica, San Pedro is located within a potential disaster zone because of the possibility for landslides in some areas.

== Demographics ==
Historical population
Census	Pop.	±% p.a.
1883	497	—
1892	568	+1.49%
1927	614	+0.22%
1950	766	+0.97%
1963	981	+1.92%
1973	1,337	+3.14%
1984	1,871	+3.10%
2000	3,652	+4.27%
2011	5,582	+3.93%
2022	5,158	−0.72%
Source: Instituto Nacional de Estadística y Censos; Centro Centroamericano de Población

For the 2011 census, San Pedro had a population of 5,582 inhabitants.

== Transportation ==
=== Road transportation ===
The district is covered by the following road routes:

- National Route 123
