= Barva =

Canton in Heredia province, Costa Rica

- Canton
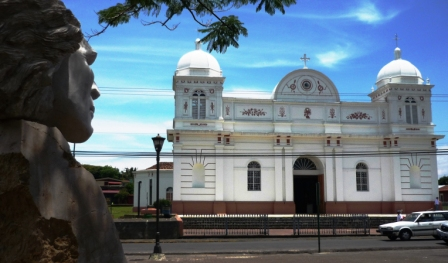
- Parish of Saint Bartholomew the Apostle and Barvak sculpture

- Flag Seal
- Interactive map of Barva
- Barva canton location in Costa Rica
- Coordinates: 10.0763757°N 84.115545°W
- Country: Costa Rica
- Province: Heredia

Government
  - Type: Municipality
  - Body: Municipalidad de Barva

Area
  - Total: 53.8 km^{2} (20.8 sq mi)
- Elevation: 1,241 m (4,072 ft)

Population (2011)
  - Total: 40,660
  - Density: 756/km^{2} (1,960/sq mi)
- Time zone: UTC−06:00
- Canton code: 402
- Website: munibarva.go.cr

Barva is the second canton in the province of Heredia in Costa Rica.

The head city of the canton is the homonymous Barva district.

== Toponymy ==
The name comes from Barvac or Barvak a cacique of the area around 1569, which in turn might come from either:

- From New Tlapallan in Nahuatl language, or Tla pallapan, which in Huetar language was Tabaraba or Abaraba, hispanicized as Barba and meaning Black River or Dark River as explained by José Fidel Tristán in 1910.
- Bal (town) and wac (anteater), meaning Anteater Town, according to Luis Ferrero.
- Bar or bur (bees) with ba or bac (tribe), meaning Bees Tribe, as explained by bishop Bernardo Augusto Thiel y Hoffmann in late 19th century, from sources from 1575 and 1599.

By Decree 188 of 4 October 1974, the name changes from Barba to Barva.

== History ==
Barva was first mentioned as a canton in a decree dated December 7, 1848.

The territory that today corresponds to the canton was part of the Western Huetar Kingdom, where the cacique named Barbak had his settlement, whose name was extended to the region between the Virilla River and the mountains of "Monte de Aguacate", which was called Barva (Valle de Barva).

Around 1575 the first Catholic church of the canton was built, and dedicated to Saint Bartholomew, after several earthquakes and reconstructions, the current building of the Parish of Saint Bartholomew the Apostle was consecrated in 1897.

On the slopes of the volcanoes Barva Barva Volcano and Poás Poás Volcano National Park there were also settlements of the indigenous ethnic group of Botos people.

== Geography ==
Barva has an area of 53.8 km^{2} and an elevation of 1,241 metres.

The elongated canton climbs from the city of Barva on the outskirts of the capital city of Heredia up the slopes of the dormant Barva Volcano, with the mountain's summit serving as its northern boundary.

The mountainous region of the canton, where the lagoon of the Barva volcano is located, is part of the area protected by the Braulio Carrillo National Park. Barva is also the access point to the Poás Volcano National Park, the most visited in the country.

Many aquifers around the area supply water for the Greater Metropolitan Area.

== Districts ==
The canton of Barva is subdivided into six districts.

1. Barva
2. San Pedro
3. San Pablo
4. San Roque
5. Santa Lucía
6. San Jose de la Montaña
7. Puente Salas

== Demographics ==
Historical population
Census	Pop.	±% p.a.
1864	3,718	—
1883	2,663	−1.74%
1892	2,964	+1.20%
1927	3,482	+0.46%
1950	5,263	+1.81%
1963	8,504	+3.76%
1973	12,864	+4.23%
1984	18,933	+3.58%
2000	32,440	+3.42%
2011	40,660	+2.07%
2022	47,699	+1.46%
Source: Instituto Nacional de Estadística y Censos; Centro Centroamericano de Población

For the 2011 census, Barva had a population of 40,660 inhabitants.

The town has a high literacy rate of (99%), and by 2012 it had a high rate of human development of (0.829) United Nations Development Program.

== Transportation ==
=== Road transportation ===
The canton is covered by the following road routes:

- National Route 113
- National Route 114
- National Route 119
- National Route 126
- National Route 128
- National Route 502

== Economy ==
The mountains of the region are appropriate for the agriculture. There are plenty of coffee plantations around the slopes of the Barva Volcano. There is also dairy production.

== Culture ==
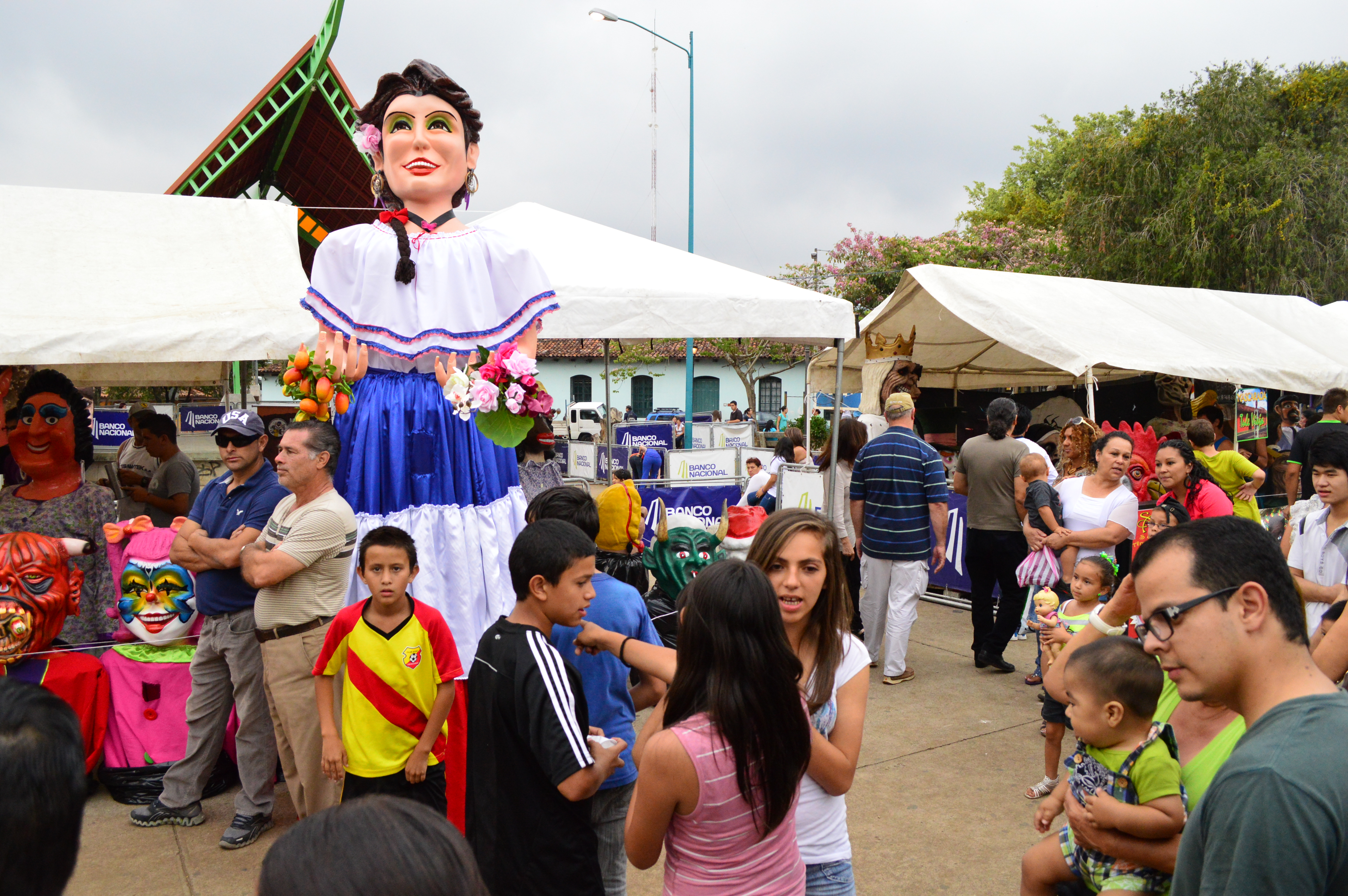
Masquerade Festival in Barva central park

The canton of Barva is known for its mix between rural and urban. The historic centre of the city has several adobe houses Colonial style classic architecture. The Saint "patron of the city" is Bartholomew the Apostle, reason why the Catholic church was named to honor Saint Bartholomew.

Barva is one of the cantons where there are traditional masquerades, particularly around the festivities of Saint Bartholomew, on 24 August.
