= Santa Lucía District =

Santa Lucía
- District
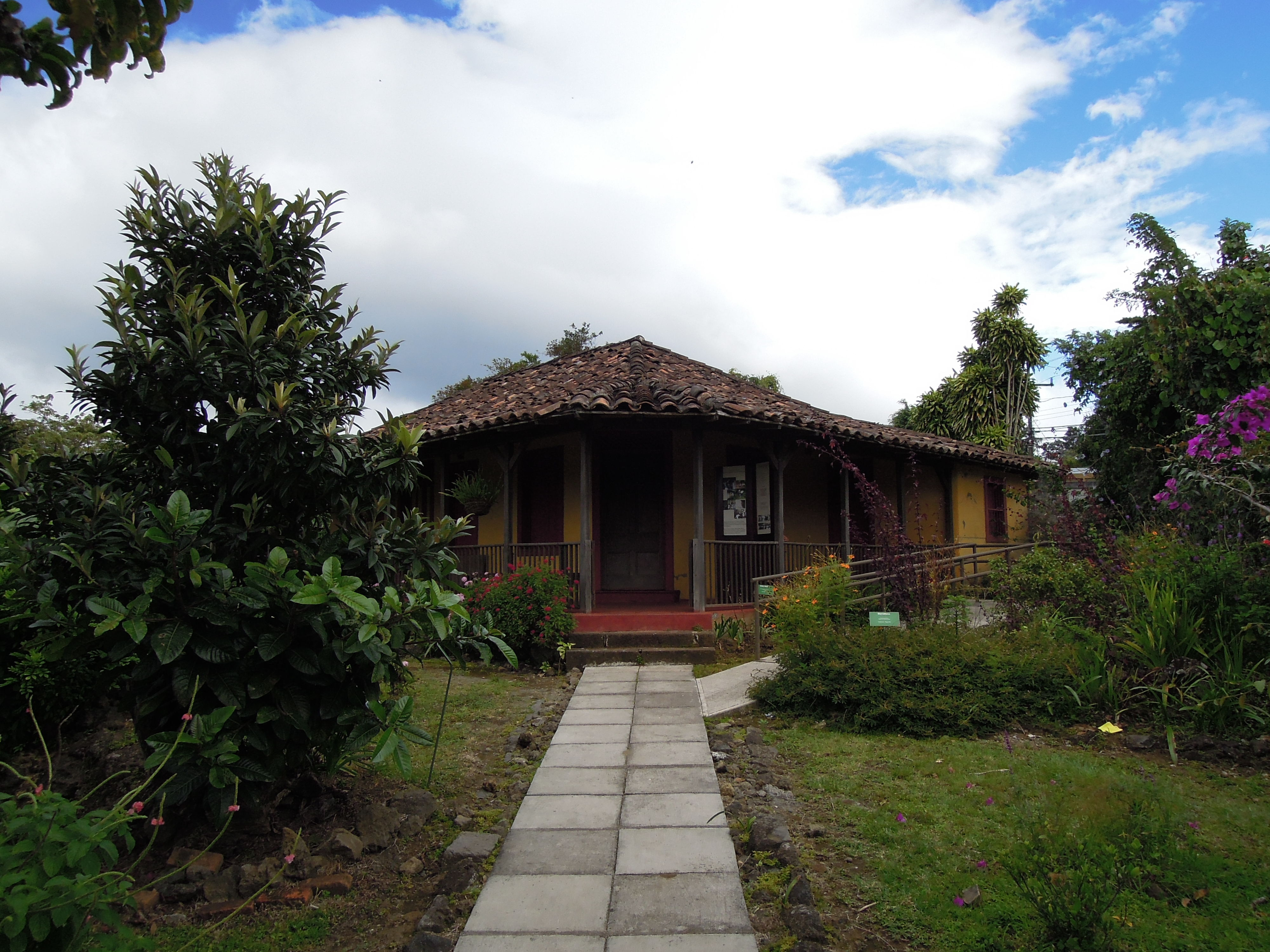
- Adobe home and gardens of former president Alfredo Gonzalez Flores at the Popular Culture Museum in Santa Lucía district.
- Santa Lucía district
- Santa Lucía district location in Costa Rica
- Coordinates: 10.0263749°N 84.1135019°W
- Country: Costa Rica
- Province: Heredia
- Canton: Barva

Area
  - Total: 2.87 km^{2} (1.11 sq mi)
- Elevation: 1,159 m (3,802 ft)

Population (2011)
  - Total: 7,413
  - Density: 2,580/km^{2} (6,690/sq mi)
- Time zone: UTC−06:00
- Postal code: 40205

Santa Lucía is the fifth district of the Barva canton, in the Heredia province of Costa Rica.

== Toponymy ==
The name alludes to Saint Lucia of Syracuse.

== History ==
=== 1998 Tornado ===
On September 22, 1998 at 13:30, the district and its surroundings were impacted for 10 minutes by the most damaging tornado recorded in the country, with 179 damaged houses, affecting 600 people. The Instituto Meteorológico Nacional (National Weather Institute) still catalogued the event as weak.

== Geography ==
Santa Lucía has an area of 2.87 km^{2} and an elevation of 1,159 metres.

It is located in the Greater Metropolitan Area, in the central valley of the country, its borders are to the north with the Barva and San Pablo districts of the Barva canton, to the east the Ángeles district of San Rafael canton, to the south the San Josecito district of San Rafael canton, and to the west the Mercedes district of the Heredia canton.

Three quebradas (creeks, small rivers) cross the district from east to west: Seca creek, Burío creek and Palmar creek, the last two converge as tributaries that form the Burío river in the southern limit of the district.

=== Residential areas ===
There are several residential area completed projects: Urbanización Jardines de Santa Lucía, Urbanización Antiesquivo, Residencial Jardines del Beneficio, Residencial Malinche Real, Urbanización Villa Esmeralda, Residencial La Ronda, Urbanización Don Álvaro, Urbanización Doña Iris, Urbanización El Tajo.

== Demographics ==
Historical population
Census	Pop.	±% p.a.
1883	159	—
1892	252	+5.25%
1927	250	−0.02%
1950	627	+4.08%
1963	1,187	+5.03%
1973	1,608	+3.08%
1984	2,560	+4.32%
2000	5,462	+4.85%
2011	7,413	+2.82%
2022	9,035	+1.82%
Source: Instituto Nacional de Estadística y Censos; Centro Centroamericano de Población

For the 2011 census, Santa Lucía had a population of 7,413 inhabitants.

== Economy ==
The district is mostly a residential area, with small businesses to attend the necessities of its inhabitants. There is an still operating coffee receiving and processing plant, the Beneficio de Café Juan León e Hijos, and small coffee orchards.

== Education ==
=== Public education ===
There is one Centro de Cuido y Desarrollo Infantil (CECUDI) (daycare center) named Sueños de Algodón (Cotton Dreams), and also one public primary school named Escuela Domingo González Pérez.

There are offsite research facilities of the Escuela de Ciencias Agrarias (Agrarian Sciences School) of National University of Costa Rica (UNA), called the Finca Experimental Santa Lucía (Santa Lucía Experimental Farm). Also the Instituto de Investigación y Servicios Forestales of UNA is located in the district.

=== Private education ===
There is a private preschool and daycare center, Centro Educativo Bilingüe Cosquillitas.

There are two private education centers, Centro Educativo Montealto, that teaches preschool, primary school, and high school, and Centro Educativo Shkénuk Montessori

== Culture ==
=== Museum ===
The Museo de Cultura Popular (Popular Culture Museum) is located in the district.

=== Cultural center ===
There are plans to build the Centro Cultural de Bandas (Musical bands cultural center) in the district, however there are allegations of corruption in the contracting procedures.

=== Leisure ===
There is a Salón Comunal (community center), several urban parks and a public soccer pitch.

The Centro de Recreo (leisure center) of the workers union of the National University of Costa Rica is also located in the district.

=== Religion ===
In 2002 the Catholic church of the district, Iglesia de Santa Lucía Virgen y Mártir which was a filial church of the Parroquia de San Bartolomé Apóstol in the Barva district, became the Parroquia de Santa Lucía Virgen y Mártir, a parish with its own filial church of Iglesia de la Medalla Milagrosa in the neighboring Barrio Peralta of San Josecito district, in the San Rafael canton.

== Health Care ==
There is one Equipos Básicos de Atención Integral en Salud (Ebais) which provides basic first line health care, managed by the Costa Rican Social Security Fund.

Also a Hogar Crea for the rehabilitation and treatment of young persons with addiction issues.

== Transportation ==
=== Road transportation ===
The district is covered by the following road routes:

- National Route 126
- National Route 502

There are no railroad access and public transportation relies in bus lines and taxicabs.

== Public utilities ==
The Empresa de Servicios Públicos de Heredia (Heredia Public Utilities Company), ESPH, is the main provider of electricity and potable water in the district. There are two water wells to extract water for their users in this and other districts, the Pozo Santa Lucía and Pozo Malinche Real, and two water tanks of their network, Tanque Antiesquivo and Tanque Santa Lucía.

There are plans by ESPH for a sewage treatment plant for this and neighboring districts, as the community relies on residential septic tanks, which is common in the country.

Telecommunications include fiber optic to the home (Provided by ICE Kölbi), cable television and full cellular telephony coverage by ICE Kölbi, Claro and Movistar.
