= Rincón de Sabanilla =

District in San Pablo canton, Heredia province, Costa Rica

- District
- Rincón de Sabanilla district
- Rincón de Sabanilla district location in Costa Rica
- Coordinates: 9.9821346°N 84.1048062°W
- Country: Costa Rica
- Province: Heredia
- Canton: San Pablo
- Creation: 19 November 2008

Area
  - Total: 2.36 km^{2} (0.91 sq mi)
- Elevation: 1,135 m (3,724 ft)

Population (2011)
  - Total: 8,259
  - Density: 3,500/km^{2} (9,060/sq mi)
- Time zone: UTC−06:00
- Postal code: 40902

Rincón de Sabanilla is a district of the San Pablo canton, in the Heredia province of Costa Rica.

== History ==
Rincón de Sabanilla was created on 19 November 2008 by Decreto Ejecutivo 34914-MG, segregated from San Pablo.

== Geography ==
Rincón de Sabanilla has an area of 2.36 km^{2} and an elevation of 1,135 metres.

== Demographics ==
Historical population
Census	Pop.	±% p.a.
2011	8,259	—
2022	10,279	+2.01%
Source: Instituto Nacional de Estadística y Censos; Centro Centroamericano de Población

For the 2011 census, Rincón de Sabanilla had a population of 8,259 inhabitants.

== Transportation ==
=== Road transportation ===
The district is covered by the following road routes:

- National Route 5

=== Rail transportation ===
The Interurbano Line operated by Incofer goes through this district.
