= Pará District, Santo Domingo =

District in Santo Domingo canton, Heredia province, Costa Rica

Pará
- District
- Pará district
- Pará district location in Costa Rica
- Coordinates: 10.0042225°N 84.0354041°W
- Country: Costa Rica
- Province: Heredia
- Canton: Santo Domingo
- Creation: 10 December 1971

Area
  - Total: 2.88 km^{2} (1.11 sq mi)
- Elevation: 1,345 m (4,413 ft)

Population (2011)
  - Total: 3,333
  - Density: 1,160/km^{2} (3,000/sq mi)
- Time zone: UTC−06:00
- Postal code: 40308

Pará, usually known as San Luis, is a district of the Santo Domingo canton, in the Heredia province of Costa Rica.

== History ==
Pará was created on 10 December 1971 by Decreto Ejecutivo 2100-G. Segregated from San Miguel.

== Geography ==
Pará has an area of 2.88 km² and an elevation of 1,345 metres.

== Demographics ==
Historical population
Census	Pop.	±% p.a.
1973	1,053	—
1984	1,859	+5.30%
2000	2,764	+2.51%
2011	3,333	+1.72%
2022	4,048	+1.78%
Source: Instituto Nacional de Estadística y Censos; Centro Centroamericano de Población

For the 2011 census, Pará had a population of 3,333 inhabitants.

== Transportation ==
=== Road transportation ===
The district is covered by the following road routes:

- National Route 32
- National Route 220
- National Route 308
- National Route 504
