= Moravia (canton) =

Canton in San José province, Costa Rica

- Canton
- Flag Seal
- Moravia canton
- Moravia canton location in San José Province Moravia canton location in Costa Rica
- Coordinates: 10.0087693°N 84.0215787°W
- Country: Costa Rica
- Province: San José
- Creation: 1 August 1914
- Named for: Juan Rafael Mora Porras
- Head city: San Vicente
- Districts: Districts: San Vicente; San Jerónimo; La Trinidad

Government
  - Type: Municipality
  - Body: Municipalidad de Moravia
  - Mayor: Diego Armando López López (PSM)

Area
  - Total: 28.82 km^{2} (11.13 sq mi)
- Elevation: 1,297 m (4,255 ft)

Population (2011)
  - Total: 56,919
  - Estimate (2022): 59,546
  - Density: 1,975/km^{2} (5,115/sq mi)
- Time zone: UTC−06:00
- Canton code: 114
- Website: moravia.go.cr

Moravia is the fourteenth canton in the San José province of Costa Rica. The head city of the canton is San Vicente.

== Toponymy ==
It is named in honour of President Juan Rafael Mora Porras (1814 – 1860). Since there was already a canton called Mora, this one was named Moravia. A minor, unofficial local legend suggested that European settlers thought the landscape of the area resembled the European region of Moravia, leading to its name.

== History ==
Moravia was created on the 1st of August 1914 by decree 55.

Law No. 55 established Villa San Vicente on 1 August 1914. The first session of the Council of Moravia was held on 19 January 1915, and the first electric street lighting was installed in the same year. Law No. 3248 gave the town of San Vicente city status on 6 December 1963.

== Geography ==
Moravia has an area of 28.82 km^{2} (11.13 sq mi) and a mean elevation of 1,297 m (4,255 ft).

The elongated canton begins in the northern suburbs of the national capital city of San José and continues northeast toward the Cordillera Central (Central Mountain Range). The Virilla, Pará, and Blanco rivers on the north and west, and the Quebrada Azul and Macho rivers on the southeast, partially delineate the boundaries of the canton.

Other rivers in Moravia include Quebrada Barreal, Quebrada Lajas, Quebrada San Francisco, Quebrada Tornillal, Quebrada Yerbabuena, Acequia, Agrá, Hondura, Ipís, Pará Grande, Paracito, and Zurquí. Mountain peaks in the area include Zurquí (1,583m), Vargas (1,396m), and Trina (1,270m).

Moravia combines densely populated suburbs in the south with rural mountain landscapes in the San Jerónimo district to the north. The cantons surrounding Moravia are Vázquez de Coronado to the east and north, San Isidro, Santo Domingo, and Tibás to the west, and Goicoechea to the south.

== Government ==
=== Mayor ===
According to Costa Rica's Municipal Code, mayors are elected every four years by the population of the canton. As of the latest municipal elections in 2024, the We Are Moravia Party (Spanish: Partido Somos Moravia; PSM) candidate, Diego Armando López López, was elected mayor of the canton with 45.36% of the votes, with Alejandra Hernández Novoa and Gerhard Phillip Hernández Padilla as first and second vice mayors, respectively.

Mayors of Moravia since the 2002 elections
Period	Name	Party
2002–2006	Alejandro Hidalgo Carballo	PLN
2006–2010	Edgar Vargas Jiménez	PAC
2010–2016	Juan Pablo Hernández Cortés	PLN
2016–2020	Roberto Zoch Gutiérrez	PAC
2020–2024	Roberto Zoch Gutiérrez	PSM
2024–2028	Diego Armando López López	PSM

=== Municipal Council ===
Like the mayor and vice mayors, members of the Municipal Council (called regidores) are elected every four years. Moravia's Municipal Council has 7 seats for regidores and their substitutes, who can participate in meetings but not vote unless the owning regidor (regidor propietario) is absent. The current president of the Municipal Council is We Are Moravia Party regidor Randall Emilio Montero Rodríguez, with Progressive Liberal Party regidora Grethel Fernández Carmona as vice-president. The Municipal Council's composition for the 2024–2028 period is as follows:

Composition of the Municipal Council of Moravia after the 2024 municipal elections
Political parties in the Municipal Council of Moravia
Political party	Regidores		
Political party	№	Owner	Substitute
We Are Moravia (PSM)	3	Randall Emilio Montero Rodríguez^{(P)}	Mauricio José Calvo Umaña
We Are Moravia (PSM)	3	Mayra Lorena Valerio Rojas	Brenda Raquel Padilla Bermúdez
We Are Moravia (PSM)	3	Marco Tulio Aguilar Bermúdez	Pedro Manuel Paganella Herrera
Progressive Liberal Party (PLP)	2	Grethel Fernández Carmona^{(VP)}	Johanna Muñoz Barahona
Progressive Liberal Party (PLP)	2	Kevin Mauricio Méndez Céspedes	Luis Eduardo Gutiérrez Montero
National Liberation Party (PLN)	2	Ronald Camacho Esquivel	Carlos Gabriel Gómez Torres
National Liberation Party (PLN)	2	Sandra Artavia Salas	Mayela Garro Herrera

== Districts ==
The canton of Moravia is subdivided into the following districts:

1. San Vicente
2. San Jerónimo
3. La Trinidad

== Demographics ==
Historical population
Census	Pop.	±% p.a.
1927	2,778	—
1950	5,727	+3.20%
1963	11,642	+5.61%
1973	19,548	+5.32%
1984	33,038	+4.89%
2000	50,419	+2.68%
2011	56,919	+1.11%
2022	59,546	+0.41%
Source: Instituto Nacional de Estadística y Censos; Centro Centroamericano de Población

Moravia had an estimated 59,546 inhabitants in 2022, up from 56,919 at the time of the 2011 census.

Moravia had a Human Development Index of 0.835 in 2022, the fifth highest in the country.

== Education ==
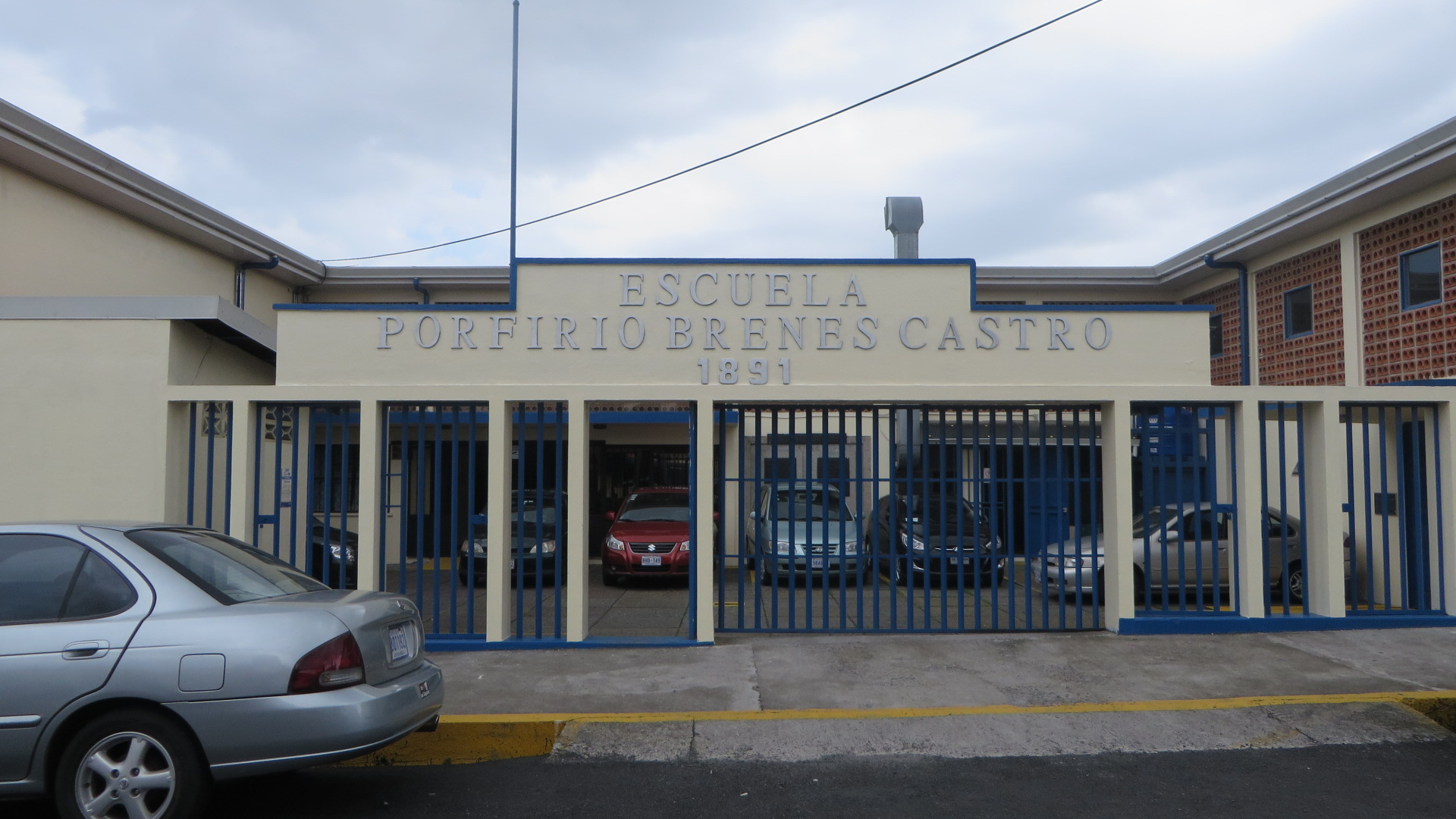
Porfirio Brenes Castro School in San Vicente

The first school was founded in 1848, called "school for the education of the children of the residents of San Vicente", and was located on the north side of the current San Vicente city park, called Parque de Moravia. A charity school was created in 1862, with two sections, one for boys and one for women.

In 1891, an adobe and brick building was created for the school and this was renamed Escuela Graduada de Varones de San Vicente (Graduate School for Boys of Saint Vincent) in 1893. Two years later, the name Graduada de Mujeres de San Vicente (Graduate School of Women of Saint Vincent) was added and these names were maintained until 1932, when the school was renamed again as Escuela Porfirio Brenes Castro, its current name. The school Porfirio Brenes Castro now occupies a city block to the south of Parque de Moravia. Porfirio Brenes Castro was a teacher who lived 28 June 1877 – 12 December 1914.

Some schools located here are, the private Saint Francis College, which was founded on 23 February 1950, and another school, "Colegio Nuestra Señora de Sión", "Saint Anthony School", "Saint Joseph", Liceo de Moravia, began teaching in March 1966., Liceo Laboratorio Emma Gamboa, and IPICIM.

At some point other schools were located here, but they moved away. Like Lincoln School, originally being founded in 1945 in Barrio la California, operating its American styled curriculum for 50 more years until they moved to Barrio Socorro.

Costa Rica's Japanese international school, Escuela Japonesa de San José (サンホセ日本人学校 Sanhose Nihonjin Gakkō), is located in Moravia.

== Transportation ==
=== Road transportation ===
The canton is covered by the following road routes:

- National Route 32
- National Route 102
- National Route 109
- National Route 117
- National Route 200
- National Route 220
- National Route 307
- National Route 308
- National Route 309

== Notable Locations ==
One of the most famous buildings here is the “Parroquia San Vicente Ferrer”, situated by the “Abraham Lincoln Park”. It is a decently tall, semi-gothic, pink colored church, with construction starting on the year 1907. Other notable places are, the “Antigua Municipalidad de Moravia”, “Los Colegios Norte Park”, and the “Centro Nacional de Música”.
