= Tures =

District in Santo Domingo canton, Heredia province, Costa Rica

- District
- Tures district
- Tures district location in Costa Rica
- Coordinates: 9.9922275°N 84.0565239°W
- Country: Costa Rica
- Province: Heredia
- Canton: Santo Domingo
- Creation: 10 December 1971

Area
  - Total: 3.9 km^{2} (1.5 sq mi)
- Elevation: 1,260 m (4,130 ft)

Population (2011)
  - Total: 3,452
  - Density: 890/km^{2} (2,300/sq mi)
- Time zone: UTC−06:00
- Postal code: 40307

Tures, usually known as Ángeles or Los Ángeles, is a district of the Santo Domingo canton, in the Heredia province of Costa Rica.

== History ==
Tures was created on 10 December 1971 by Decreto Ejecutivo 2100-G. Segregated from San Miguel.

== Geography ==
Tures has an area of 3.9 km² and an elevation of 1,260 metres.

== Demographics ==
Historical population
Census	Pop.	±% p.a.
1973	1,267	—
1984	1,700	+2.71%
2000	2,720	+2.98%
2011	3,452	+2.19%
2022	4,895	+3.23%
Source: Instituto Nacional de Estadística y Censos; Centro Centroamericano de Población

For the 2011 census, Tures had a population of 3,452 inhabitants.

== Transportation ==
=== Road transportation ===
The district is covered by the following road routes:

- National Route 116
- National Route 117
- National Route 504
