= National Route 502 (Costa Rica) =

Road route in Costa Rica

National Tertiary Route 502
- Ruta nacional terciaria 502

Route information
- Maintained by Ministry of Public Works and Transport
- Length: 5.970 km (3.710 mi)

Major junctions
- South end: Route 113
- North end: Route 114

Location
- Country: Costa Rica

Highway system
- National Road Network of Costa Rica
← Route 417	→ Route 503

National Tertiary Route 502, or just Route 502 (Spanish: Ruta Nacional Terciaria 502, or Ruta 502), known as Carretera de Getsemaní, is a National Road Route of Costa Rica, located in the Heredia province, it is a road between Route 113 and Route 114.

== Description ==
The route follows a hilly and tight road, and crosses the middle of the Getsemaní village, in San Rafael canton, while at the same time, partially draws the northeast limit of the Santa Lucía district of the Barva canton with San Rafael canton.

Since 2017, the local governments have asked the central government to improve the conditions of the road.

In Heredia province the route covers Barva canton (San Pablo, Santa Lucía districts), San Rafael canton (San Josecito district).
