= San Francisco District =

San Francisco District may refer to:

- Peru:
  - San Francisco District, Ambo
- Panama:
  - San Francisco District, Panama
- Costa Rica:
  - San Francisco District, Cartago (also known as Aguacaliente), in Cartago Canton, Cartago province
  - San Francisco District, Goicoechea, in Goicoechea Canton, San José province
  - San Francisco District, Heredia, in Heredia Canton, Heredia province
  - San Francisco District, San Isidro, in San Isidro Canton, Heredia province

== See also ==
- San Francisco (disambiguation)
