= Concepción District, San Isidro =

District in San Isidro canton, Heredia province, Costa Rica

Concepción
- District
- Interactive map of Concepción
- Concepción district location in Costa Rica
- Coordinates: 10.0421642°N 84.0392044°W
- Country: Costa Rica
- Province: Heredia
- Canton: San Isidro

Area
  - Total: 8.03 km^{2} (3.10 sq mi)
- Elevation: 1,390 m (4,560 ft)

Population (2011)
  - Total: 2,635
  - Density: 328/km^{2} (850/sq mi)
- Time zone: UTC−06:00
- Postal code: 40603

Concepción is a district of the San Isidro canton, in the Heredia province of Costa Rica.

== Geography ==
Concepción has an area of 8.03 km² and an elevation of 1,390 metres.

== Demographics ==
Historical population
Census	Pop.	±% p.a.
1927	622	—
1950	522	−0.76%
1963	722	+2.53%
1973	960	+2.89%
1984	850	−1.10%
2000	2,081	+5.76%
2011	2,635	+2.17%
2022	3,147	+1.63%
Source: Instituto Nacional de Estadística y Censos; Centro Centroamericano de Población

For the 2011 census, Concepción had a population of 2,635 inhabitants.

== Transportation ==
=== Road transportation ===
The district is covered by the following road routes:
