= National Route 5 (Costa Rica) =

Road in Costa Rica

National Primary Route 5
- Ruta nacional primaria 5

Route information
- Maintained by Ministry of Public Works and Transport
- Length: 8.7 km (5.4 mi)

Major junctions
- South end: Route 108
- North end: Route 3

Location
- Country: Costa Rica
- Provinces: San José, Heredia

Highway system
- National Road Network of Costa Rica
← Route 4	→ Route 6

National Primary Route 5, or just Route 5 (Spanish: Ruta Nacional Primaria 5, or Ruta 5) is a National Road Route of Costa Rica, and it is a road from the area known as Tournón, in the triple limit of the Cinco Esquinas, Tibás district, Merced, San José district, and San Francisco, Goicoechea district in San José province to the Heredia district in the Heredia province of Costa Rica, and joins Route 108 and Route 3.

== Description ==
The route is short in distance at 8.7 km, goes from downtown San José, north of Casco Central (downtown area), through the districts of Cinco Esquinas, San Juan of Tibás canton, and Santo Domingo, Santo Tomás, Santa Rosa, of Santo Domingo canton, and San Pablo canton, ending in Heredia district.

The route is also an east parallel alternative to the San José to Heredia segment of Route 3.

In San José province the route covers Tibás canton (San Juan and Cinco Esquinas districts).

In Heredia province the route covers Heredia canton (Heredia district), Santo Domingo canton (Santo Domingo, San Vicente, and Santa Rosa districts), and San Pablo canton (San Pablo and Rincon de Sabanilla districts).

== History ==
On 23 March 2020, the Heredia terminus section was bifurcated to improve the traffic, by making Route 5 into an Heredia outbound section, and annexing 1.5 km of the immediate north road, Avenida Joaquín Rodríguez, as Heredia inbound section, with a new semaphore at the joining point with Route 3. This bifurcation provides two lanes in each way, but the right lane will be for public transportation exclusive use at peak traffic hours (06:00-08:30 and 15:00-19:00). Both sections converge at the Route 5 and Calle 35 point, to one lane in each direction.
