= Santa Rosa District, Santo Domingo =

District in Santo Domingo canton, Heredia province, Costa Rica

Santa Rosa
- District
- Santa Rosa district
- Santa Rosa district location in Costa Rica
- Coordinates: 9.9725816°N 84.0994208°W
- Country: Costa Rica
- Province: Heredia
- Canton: Santo Domingo

Area
  - Total: 4.25 km^{2} (1.64 sq mi)
- Elevation: 1,118 m (3,668 ft)

Population (2011)
  - Total: 7,269
  - Density: 1,710/km^{2} (4,430/sq mi)
- Time zone: UTC−06:00
- Postal code: 40306

Santa Rosa is a district of the Santo Domingo canton in the Heredia province of Costa Rica.

== Geography ==
Santa Rosa has an area of 4.25 km² and an elevation of 1,118 metres.

== Demographics ==
Historical population
Census	Pop.	±% p.a.
1892	754	—
1927	826	+0.26%
1950	1,075	+1.15%
1963	1,862	+4.32%
1973	3,145	+5.38%
1984	4,357	+3.01%
2000	6,396	+2.43%
2011	7,269	+1.17%
2022	7,819	+0.67%
Source: Instituto Nacional de Estadística y Censos; Centro Centroamericano de Población

For the 2011 census, Santa Rosa had a population of 7,269 inhabitants.

== Transportation ==
=== Road transportation ===
The district is covered by the following road routes:

- National Route 5
- National Route 103

=== Rail transportation ===
The Interurbano Line operated by Incofer goes through this district.
