= San Isidro District, San Isidro =

District in San Isidro canton, Heredia province, Costa Rica

San Isidro
- District
- San Isidro district
- San Isidro district location in Costa Rica
- Coordinates: 10.0135022°N 84.0526982°W
- Country: Costa Rica
- Province: Heredia
- Canton: San Isidro

Area
  - Total: 2.66 km^{2} (1.03 sq mi)
- Elevation: 1,360 m (4,460 ft)

Population (2011)
  - Total: 6,113
  - Density: 2,300/km^{2} (5,950/sq mi)
- Time zone: UTC−06:00
- Postal code: 40601

San Isidro is a district of the San Isidro canton, in the Heredia province of Costa Rica.

== Geography ==
San Isidro has an area of 2.66 km² and an elevation of 1,360 metres.

== Demographics ==
Historical population
Census	Pop.	±% p.a.
1864	736	—
1883	1,561	+4.04%
1892	1,973	+2.64%
1927	1,355	−1.07%
1950	1,696	+0.98%
1963	2,461	+2.91%
1973	3,738	+4.27%
1984	5,813	+4.10%
2000	4,990	−0.95%
2011	6,113	+1.86%
2022	6,965	+1.19%
Source: Instituto Nacional de Estadística y Censos; Centro Centroamericano de Población

For the 2011 census, San Isidro had a population of 6,113 inhabitants.

== Transportation ==
=== Road transportation ===
The district is covered by the following road routes:

- National Route 112
- National Route 116
