= Miss Grand Costa Rica 2025 =

2nd Miss Grand Costa Rica competition, beauty pageant edition

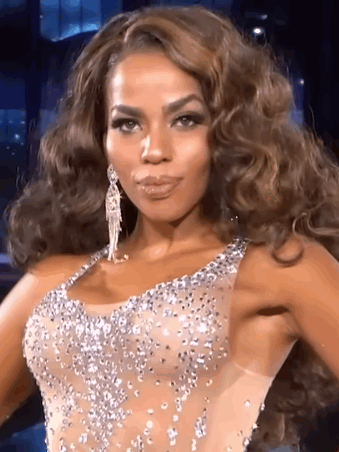
- Kristel Gómez, the winner of the contest
- Date: 28 August 2025
- Presenters: Adriana Víquez; Bray Vargas
- Venue: Auditorio Nacional Museo de los Niños, San José, Costa Rica
- Broadcaster: Fashion Life & Style Latinoamérica; YouTube
- Entrants: 25
- Placements: 16
- Winner: Kristel Gómez (Heredia)

External videos
- Grand Final

Miss Grand Costa Rica 2025 was the 2nd edition of Miss Grand Costa Rica pageant, held on 28 August 2025, at the Auditorio Nacional Museo de los Niños, San José, Costa Rica. Twenty-five contestants from all 7 provinces of Costa Rica competed for the title.

The contest was won by a 31-year-old Kristel Gómez, representing the Heredia Province. Kristel later represented the country at the Miss Grand International 2025 pageant, held in Thailand on 16 October 2025, but was unplaced.

The event was hosted by a Costa Rican television personality Adriana Víquez and a Dominican politician and internet personality Bray Vargas.

== Results ==
| Position | Delegate |
|---|---|
| Miss Grand Costa Rica 2025 | Heredia III – Kristel Gómez |
| Miss Latinoamercia Costa Rica 2025 | Heredia V – Luzmery Rodriguez (Note: Awarded in the preliminary round) |
| 1st runner-up | San José II – Aylin Montero |
| 2nd runner-up | Puntarenas II – Karla Sequeira |
| 3rd runner-up | Heredia I – Ana Carolina Artavia |
| 4th runner-up | Cartago IV – Jimena Zuñiga Herrera |
| 5th runner-up | Guanacaste IV – Kendra Valeska Villalobos |
| Top 16 | Alajuela I – Marisol; Guanacaste I – Malu Fajardo; Guanacaste II – Sugey Obando; Guanacaste III – Gabriella Reyes; Heredia IV – Joheysi Lopez; Limón I – Ritchelle Avendaño; Limón III – Ashley Hernandez; Limón IV – Shanill Veach; Puntarenas III– Tatiana Vallejos Rojas |
Special awards
| Best Body | Puntarenas II – Karla Sequeira |
| Best Talent | Guanacaste III – Gabriella |
| Miss Elegance | Cartago II – Monserrath Jiménez |

== Candidates ==
1. Limón I – Ritchelle Avendaño
2. Heredia I – Ana Carolina Artavia
3. Alajuela I – Marisol
4. Cartago I – Dixiana Burgos
5. San José I – Melany Bedoya
6. Heredia II – Ashley Campos
7. Guanacaste I – Malu Fajardo
8. Limón II – Candy Gaitan
9. Heredia III – Kristel Gómez
10. Limón III – Ashley Hernandez
11. Cartago II – Monserrath Jiménez
12. Heredia IV – Joheysi Lopez
13. Cartago III – Mariana Marín Castro
14. Alajuela II – Kristel Mongee
15. San José II – Aylin Montero
16. Guanacaste II – Sugey Obando
17. Puntarenas I – Kiara Ramirez Garro
18. Guanacaste III – Gabriella Reyes
19. Heredia V – Luzmery Rodriguez
20. Puntarenas II – Karla Sequeira
21. San José III – Sofi Solano
22. Puntarenas III– Tatiana Vallejos Rojas
23. Limón IV – Shanill Veach
24. Guanacaste IV – Kendra Valeska Villalobos
25. Cartago IV – Jimena Zuñiga Herrera
