= Concepción District, San Rafael =

District in San Rafael canton, Heredia province, Costa Rica

Concepción
- District
- Interactive map of Concepción
- Concepción district location in Costa Rica
- Coordinates: 10.0450063°N 84.0693483°W
- Country: Costa Rica
- Province: Heredia
- Canton: San Rafael

Area
  - Total: 22.67 km^{2} (8.75 sq mi)
- Elevation: 1,490 m (4,890 ft)

Population (2011)
  - Total: 6,077
  - Density: 268.1/km^{2} (694.3/sq mi)
- Time zone: UTC−06:00
- Postal code: 40505

Concepción is a district of the San Rafael canton, in the Heredia province of Costa Rica.

== Geography ==
Concepción has an area of 22.67 km^{2} and an elevation of 1,490 metres.

== Demographics ==
Historical population
Census	Pop.	±% p.a.
1892	359	—
1927	756	+2.15%
1950	994	+1.20%
1963	1,245	+1.75%
1973	1,527	+2.06%
1984	1,914	+2.07%
2000	4,158	+4.97%
2011	6,077	+3.51%
2022	8,656	+3.27%
Source: Instituto Nacional de Estadística y Censos; Centro Centroamericano de Población

For the 2011 census, Concepción had a population of 6,077 inhabitants.

== Transportation ==
=== Road transportation ===
The district is covered by the following road routes:

- National Route 116
