= Paracito =

District in Santo Domingo canton, Heredia province, Costa Rica

- District
- Paracito district
- Paracito district location in Costa Rica
- Coordinates: 10.002274°N 84.0289758°W
- Country: Costa Rica
- Province: Heredia
- Canton: Santo Domingo

Area
  - Total: 1.12 km^{2} (0.43 sq mi)
- Elevation: 1,289 m (4,229 ft)

Population (2011)
  - Total: 2,231
  - Density: 1,990/km^{2} (5,160/sq mi)
- Time zone: UTC−06:00
- Postal code: 40304

Paracito is a district of the Santo Domingo canton, in the Heredia province of Costa Rica.

== Geography ==
Paracito has an area of 1.12 km^{2} and an elevation of 1,289 metres.

== Demographics ==
Historical population
Census	Pop.	±% p.a.
1892	190	—
1927	190	+0.00%
1950	271	+1.56%
1963	448	+3.94%
1973	914	+7.39%
1984	1,388	+3.87%
2000	1,604	+0.91%
2011	2,231	+3.04%
2022	2,567	+1.28%
Source: Instituto Nacional de Estadística y Censos; Centro Centroamericano de Población

For the 2011 census, Paracito had a population of 2,231 inhabitants.

== Transportation ==
=== Road transportation ===
The district is covered by the following road routes:

- National Route 220
- National Route 307
- National Route 308
