= Santiago District, San Rafael =

District in San Rafael canton, Heredia province, Costa Rica

Santiago
- District
- Santiago district
- Santiago district location in Costa Rica
- Coordinates: 10.0053227°N 84.1000659°W
- Country: Costa Rica
- Province: Heredia
- Canton: San Rafael

Area
  - Total: 1.64 km^{2} (0.63 sq mi)
- Elevation: 1,220 m (4,000 ft)

Population (2011)
  - Total: 8,409
  - Density: 5,130/km^{2} (13,300/sq mi)
- Time zone: UTC−06:00
- Postal code: 40503

Santiago is a district of the San Rafael canton, in the Heredia province of Costa Rica.

== Geography ==
Santiago has an area of 1.64 km² and an elevation of 1,220 metres.

== Demographics ==
Historical population
| Census | Pop. | ±% p.a. |
|---|---|---|
| 1892 | 724 | — |
| 1927 | 385 | −1.79% |
| 1950 | 494 | +1.09% |
| 1963 | 599 | +1.49% |
| 1973 | 959 | +4.82% |
| 1984 | 2,837 | +10.36% |
| 2000 | 6,878 | +5.69% |
| 2011 | 8,409 | +1.84% |
| 2022 | 8,048 | −0.40% |
Source: Instituto Nacional de Estadística y Censos; Centro Centroamericano de Población

For the 2011 census, Santiago had a population of 8,409 inhabitants.

== Transportation ==
=== Road transportation ===
The district is covered by the following road routes:

- National Route 113
- National Route 503
