= San Vicente District, Santo Domingo =

District in Santo Domingo canton, Heredia province, Costa Rica

San Vicente
- District
- San Vicente district
- San Vicente district location in Costa Rica
- Coordinates: 9.990663°N 84.080696°W
- Country: Costa Rica
- Province: Heredia
- Canton: Santo Domingo

Area
  - Total: 2.91 km^{2} (1.12 sq mi)
- Elevation: 1,180 m (3,870 ft)

Population (2011)
  - Total: 6,427
  - Density: 2,210/km^{2} (5,720/sq mi)
- Time zone: UTC−06:00
- Postal code: 40302

San Vicente is a district of the Santo Domingo canton in the Heredia province of Costa Rica.

== Geography ==
San Vicente has an area of 2.91 km² and an elevation of 1,180 metres.

== Demographics ==
Historical population
Census	Pop.	±% p.a.
1883	256	—
1892	391	+4.82%
1927	166	−2.42%
1950	461	+4.54%
1963	995	+6.10%
1984	3,302	+5.88%
2000	5,167	+2.84%
2011	6,427	+2.00%
2022	7,073	+0.87%
Source: Instituto Nacional de Estadística y Censos; Centro Centroamericano de Población

For the 2011 census, San Vicente had a population of 6,427 inhabitants.

== Transportation ==
=== Road transportation ===
The district is covered by the following road routes:

- National Route 5
