= San José District =

San José District may refer to:

- Peru
  - San José District, Azángaro, in Azángaro province, Puno region
  - San José District, Lambayeque, in Lambayeque province, Lambayeque region
  - San José District, Pacasmayo, in Pacasmayo province, La Libertad region
- Costa Rica
  - San José District, Alajuela, in Alajuela (canton), Alajuela province
  - San José District, Atenas, in Atenas (canton), Alajuela province
  - San José District, Grecia, in Grecia (canton), Alajuela province
  - San José District, Naranjo, in Naranjo (canton), Alajuela province
  - San José District, San Isidro, in San Isidro (canton), Heredia province
  - San José District, Upala (also known as Pizote), in Upala (canton), Alajuela province

== See also ==
- San José (disambiguation)
