= San Pablo District, San Pablo, Heredia =

District in San Pablo canton, Heredia province, Costa Rica

San Pablo
- District
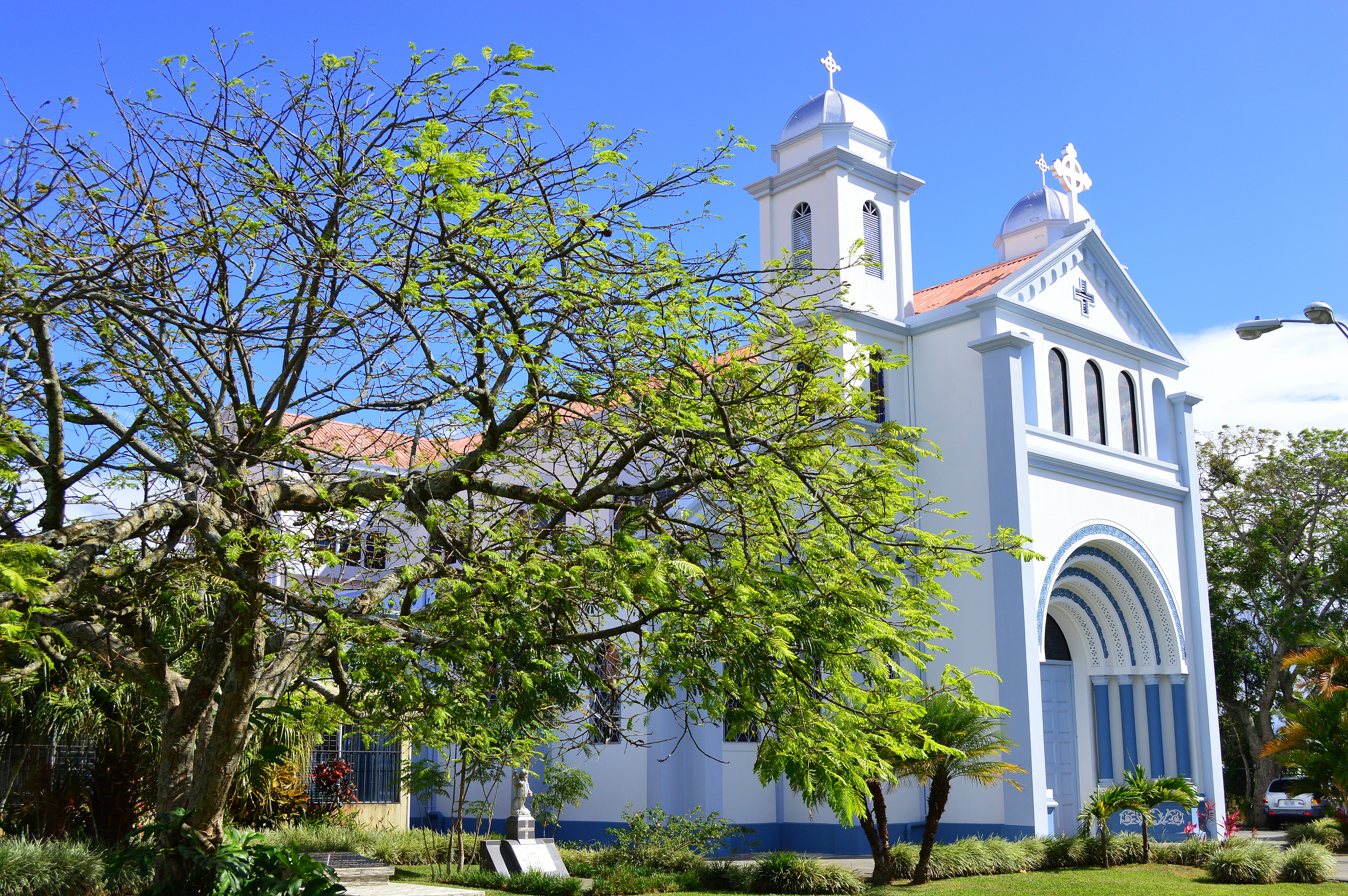
- Iglesia de San Pablo de Heredia
- San Pablo district
- San Pablo district location in Costa Rica
- Coordinates: 9.9987758°N 84.0910241°W
- Country: Costa Rica
- Province: Heredia
- Canton: San Pablo

Area
  - Total: 5.88 km^{2} (2.27 sq mi)
- Elevation: 1,200 m (3,900 ft)

Population (2011)
  - Total: 19,412
  - Density: 3,300/km^{2} (8,550/sq mi)
- Time zone: UTC−06:00
- Postal code: 40901

San Pablo is a district of the San Pablo canton, in the Heredia province of Costa Rica.

== Geography ==
San Pablo has an area of 5.88 km^{2} and an elevation of 1,200 metres.

== Demographics ==
Historical population
Census	Pop.	±% p.a.
1864	1,508	—
1883	1,818	+0.99%
1892	1,795	−0.14%
1927	1,814	+0.03%
1950	1,935	+0.28%
1963	4,092	+5.93%
1973	6,660	+4.99%
1984	11,802	+5.34%
2000	20,813	+3.61%
2011	19,412	−0.63%
2022	19,581	+0.08%
Source: Instituto Nacional de Estadística y Censos; Centro Centroamericano de Población

For the 2011 census, San Pablo had a population of 19,412 inhabitants.

== Transportation ==
=== Road transportation ===
The district is covered by the following road routes:

- National Route 5
- National Route 112
- National Route 115
- National Route 503
