= National Route 503 (Costa Rica) =

National Road Route in Costa Rica

National Tertiary Route 503
- Ruta nacional terciaria 503

Route information
- Maintained by Ministry of Public Works and Transport
- Length: 1.495 km (0.929 mi)

Location
- Country: Costa Rica
- Provinces: Heredia

Highway system
- National Road Network of Costa Rica
← Route 502	→ Route 504

National Tertiary Route 503, or just Route 503 (Spanish: Ruta Nacional Terciaria 503, or Ruta 503) is a National Road Route of Costa Rica, located in the Heredia province.

== Description ==
In Heredia province the route covers San Rafael canton (San Rafael, Santiago districts), San Pablo canton (San Pablo district).
