= National Route 504 (Costa Rica) =

National Road Route in Costa Rica

National Tertiary Route 504
- Ruta nacional terciaria 504

Route information
- Maintained by Ministry of Public Works and Transport
- Length: 3.025 km (1.880 mi)

Location
- Country: Costa Rica
- Provinces: Heredia

Highway system
- National Road Network of Costa Rica
← Route 503	→ Route 505

National Tertiary Route 504, or just Route 504 (Spanish: Ruta Nacional Terciaria 504, or Ruta 504) is a National Road Route of Costa Rica, located in the Heredia province.

== Description ==
In Heredia province the route covers Santo Domingo canton (Tures, Pará districts).
