= National Route 115 (Costa Rica) =

National Road Route in Costa Rica

National Secondary Route 115
- Ruta nacional secundaria 115

Route information
- Maintained by Ministry of Public Works and Transport
- Length: 1.375 km (0.854 mi)

Location
- Country: Costa Rica
- Provinces: Heredia

Highway system
- National Road Network of Costa Rica
← Route 114	→ Route 116

National Secondary Route 115, or just Route 115 (Spanish: Ruta Nacional Secundaria 115, or Ruta 115), is a National Road Route of Costa Rica, located in the Heredia province.

== Description ==
In Heredia province the route covers San Pablo canton (San Pablo district).
