= National Route 116 (Costa Rica) =

National Road Route in Costa Rica

National Secondary Route 116
- Ruta nacional secundaria 116

Route information
- Maintained by Ministry of Public Works and Transport
- Length: 14.920 km (9.271 mi)

Location
- Country: Costa Rica
- Provinces: Heredia

Highway system
- National Road Network of Costa Rica
← Route 115	→ Route 117

National Secondary Route 116, or just Route 116 (Spanish: Ruta Nacional Secundaria 116, or Ruta 116) is a National Road Route of Costa Rica located in the Heredia province.

== Description ==
In Heredia province the route covers Santo Domingo canton (Santo Domingo, Santo Tomás, Tures districts), San Rafael canton (San Rafael, Concepción districts), and San Isidro canton (San Isidro district).
