= San Pablo (canton) =

Canton in Heredia province, Costa Rica

- Canton
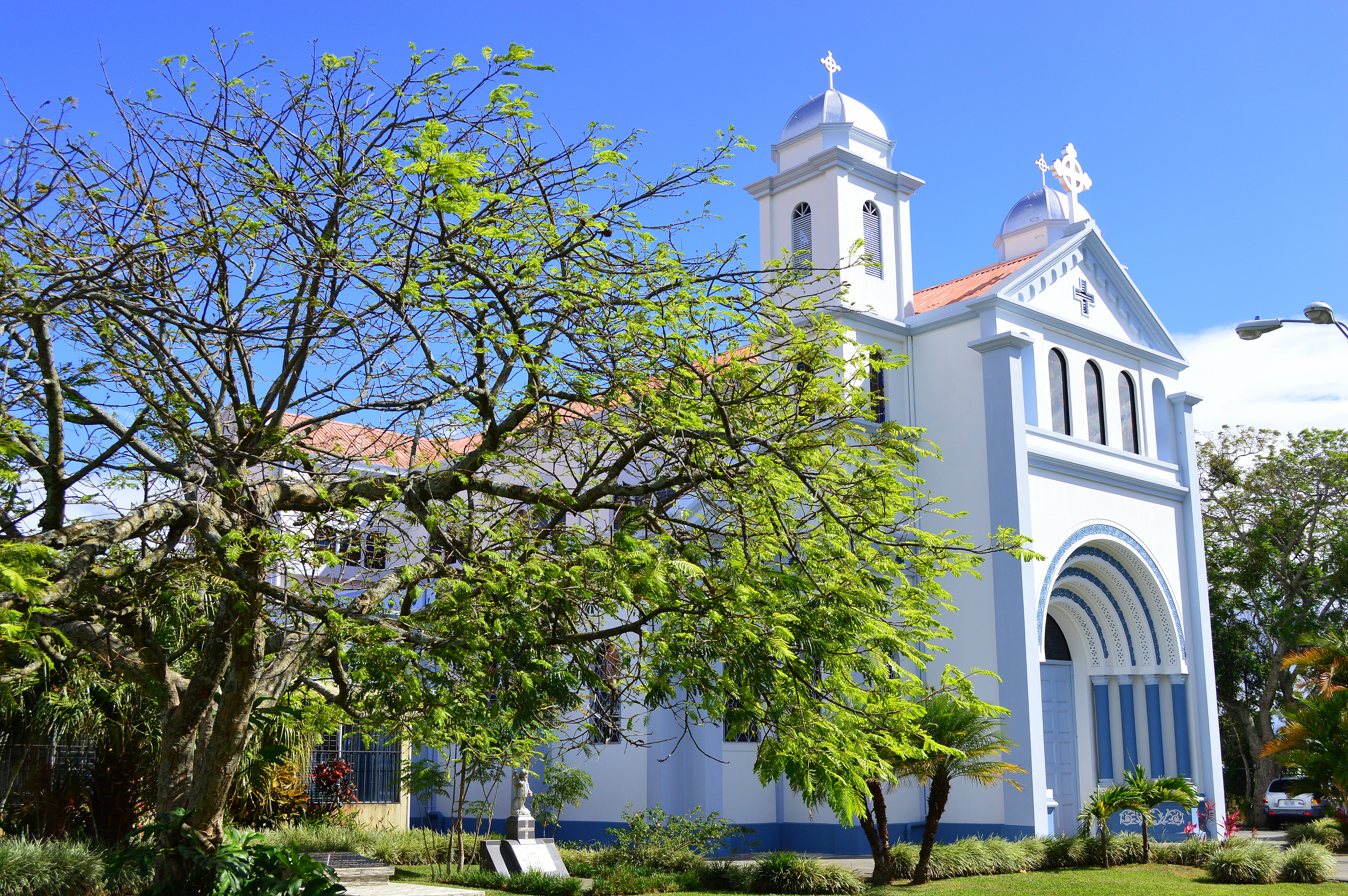
- San Pablo Church

- Flag
- San Pablo canton
- San Pablo canton location in Costa Rica
- Coordinates: 9.9917559°N 84.0936586°W
- Country: Costa Rica
- Province: Heredia
- Creation: 18 July 1961
- Head city: San Pablo
- Districts: Districts: San Pablo; Rincón de Sabanilla

Government
  - Type: Municipality
  - Body: Municipalidad de San Pablo

Area
  - Total: 7.53 km^{2} (2.91 sq mi)
- Elevation: 1,168 m (3,832 ft)

Population (2011)
  - Total: 27,671
  - Density: 3,670/km^{2} (9,520/sq mi)
- Time zone: UTC−06:00
- Canton code: 409
- Website: www.sanpablo.go.cr

San Pablo is a canton in the Heredia province of Costa Rica. The head city is in San Pablo district.

== History ==
San Pablo was created on 18 July 1961 by decree 2789.

== Geography ==
San Pablo has an area of 7.53 km^{2} and a mean elevation of 1,168 metres.

The canton is in the foothills southeast of the provincial capital city of Heredia, with the Bermúdez River as the southeast boundary and the Pirro River delineating the furthest portion of the northwestern border.

== Districts ==
The canton of San Pablo is subdivided into the following districts:

1. San Pablo
2. Rincón de Sabanilla

== Demographics ==
Historical population
Census	Pop.	±% p.a.
1963	4,092	—
1973	6,660	+4.99%
1984	11,802	+5.34%
2000	20,813	+3.61%
2011	27,671	+2.62%
2022	29,860	+0.69%
Source: Instituto Nacional de Estadística y Censos; Centro Centroamericano de Población

For the 2011 census, San Pablo had a population of 27,671 inhabitants.

== Transportation ==
=== Road transportation ===
The canton is covered by the following road routes:

- National Route 5
- National Route 112
- National Route 115
- National Route 503

=== Rail transportation ===
The Interurbano Line operated by Incofer goes through this canton.
