= San Rafael District, San Rafael =

District in San Rafael canton, Heredia province, Costa Rica

San Rafael
- District
- San Rafael district
- San Rafael district location in Costa Rica
- Coordinates: 10.0156734°N 84.0991615°W
- Country: Costa Rica
- Province: Heredia
- Canton: San Rafael

Area
  - Total: 1.3 km^{2} (0.50 sq mi)
- Elevation: 1,264 m (4,147 ft)

Population (2011)
  - Total: 9,668
  - Density: 7,400/km^{2} (19,000/sq mi)
- Time zone: UTC−06:00
- Postal code: 40501

San Rafael is a district of the San Rafael canton, in the Heredia province of Costa Rica.

== Geography ==
San Rafael has an area of 1.3 km² and an elevation of 1,264 metres.

== Demographics ==
Historical population
Census	Pop.	±% p.a.
1864	2,743	—
1883	3,818	+1.76%
1892	1,612	−9.14%
1927	1,542	−0.13%
1950	1,556	+0.04%
1963	2,835	+4.72%
1973	4,720	+5.23%
1984	7,141	+3.84%
2000	8,651	+1.21%
2011	9,668	+1.02%
2022	8,981	−0.67%
Source: Instituto Nacional de Estadística y Censos; Centro Centroamericano de Población

For the 2011 census, San Rafael had a population of 9,668 inhabitants.

== Transportation ==
=== Road transportation ===
The district is covered by the following road routes:

- National Route 113
- National Route 116
- National Route 503
