= San Francisco District, San Isidro =

District in San Isidro canton, Heredia province, Costa Rica

San Francisco
- District
- San Francisco district
- San Francisco district location in Costa Rica
- Coordinates: 10.0099535°N 84.0656467°W
- Country: Costa Rica
- Province: Heredia
- Canton: San Isidro
- Creation: 8 July 1999

Area
  - Total: 4.6 km^{2} (1.8 sq mi)
- Elevation: 1,267 m (4,157 ft)

Population (2011)
  - Total: 4,438
  - Density: 960/km^{2} (2,500/sq mi)
- Time zone: UTC−06:00
- Postal code: 40604

San Francisco is a district of the San Isidro canton, in the Heredia province of Costa Rica.

== History ==
San Francisco was created on 8 July 1999 by Ley 7894.

== Geography ==
San Francisco has an area of 4.6 km² and an elevation of 1,267 metres.

== Demographics ==
Historical population
Census	Pop.	±% p.a.
2000	3,883	—
2011	4,438	+1.22%
2022	4,772	+0.66%
Source: Instituto Nacional de Estadística y Censos; Centro Centroamericano de Población

For the 2011 census, San Francisco had a population of 4,438 inhabitants.

== Transportation ==
=== Road transportation ===
The district is covered by the following road routes:

- National Route 112
