= Ángeles District, San Rafael =

District in San Rafael canton, Heredia province, Costa Rica

Ángeles
- District
- Ángeles district
- Ángeles district location in Costa Rica
- Coordinates: 10.0685097°N 84.0885115°W
- Country: Costa Rica
- Province: Heredia
- Canton: San Rafael

Area
  - Total: 21.23 km^{2} (8.20 sq mi)
- Elevation: 1,496 m (4,908 ft)

Population (2011)
  - Total: 10,232
  - Density: 482.0/km^{2} (1,248/sq mi)
- Time zone: UTC−06:00
- Postal code: 40504

Ángeles is a district of the San Rafael canton, in the Heredia province of Costa Rica.

== Geography ==
Ángeles has an area of 21.23 km² and an elevation of 1,496 metres.

== Demographics ==
Historical population
Census	Pop.	±% p.a.
1892	534	—
1927	888	+1.46%
1950	1,349	+1.83%
1963	1,995	+3.06%
1973	2,783	+3.38%
1984	3,930	+3.19%
2000	6,780	+3.47%
2011	10,232	+3.81%
2022	12,556	+1.88%
Source: Instituto Nacional de Estadística y Censos; Centro Centroamericano de Población

For the 2011 census, Ángeles had a population of 10,232 inhabitants.

== Transportation ==
=== Road transportation ===
The district is covered by the following road routes:

- National Route 113
