= National Route 308 (Costa Rica) =

National Road Route in Costa Rica

National Tertiary Route 308
- Ruta nacional terciaria 308

Route information
- Maintained by Ministry of Public Works and Transport
- Length: 7.190 km (4.468 mi)

Location
- Country: Costa Rica
- Provinces: San José, Heredia

Highway system
- National Road Network of Costa Rica
← Route 307	→ Route 309

National Tertiary Route 308, or just Route 308 (Spanish: Ruta Nacional Terciaria 308, or Ruta 308) is a National Road Route of Costa Rica, located in the San José, Heredia provinces.

== Description ==
In San José province the route covers Moravia canton (San Jerónimo district).

In Heredia province the route covers Santo Domingo canton (Paracito and Pará districts).
