= San José District, San Isidro =

District in San Isidro canton, Heredia province, Costa Rica

San José
- District
- San José district
- San José district location in Costa Rica
- Coordinates: 10.0325366°N 84.030935°W
- Country: Costa Rica
- Province: Heredia
- Canton: San Isidro

Area
  - Total: 11.37 km^{2} (4.39 sq mi)
- Elevation: 1,330 m (4,360 ft)

Population (2011)
  - Total: 7,447
  - Density: 655.0/km^{2} (1,696/sq mi)
- Time zone: UTC−06:00
- Postal code: 40602

San José is a district of the San Isidro canton, in the Heredia province of Costa Rica.

== Geography ==
San José has an area of 11.37 km² and an elevation of 1,330 metres.

== Demographics ==
Historical population
| Census | Pop. | ±% p.a. |
|---|---|---|
| 1927 | 767 | — |
| 1950 | 631 | −0.85% |
| 1963 | 878 | +2.57% |
| 1973 | 1,281 | +3.85% |
| 1984 | 1,865 | +3.47% |
| 2000 | 5,102 | +6.49% |
| 2011 | 7,447 | +3.50% |
| 2022 | 7,922 | +0.56% |
Source: Instituto Nacional de Estadística y Censos; Centro Centroamericano de Población

For the 2011 census, San José had a population of 7,447 inhabitants.

== Transportation ==
=== Road transportation ===
The district is covered by the following road routes:

- National Route 32
- National Route 112
