= National Route 220 (Costa Rica) =

National Road Route in Costa Rica

National Secondary Route 220
- Ruta nacional secundaria 220

Route information
- Maintained by Ministry of Public Works and Transport
- Length: 7.390 km (4.592 mi)

Location
- Country: Costa Rica
- Provinces: San José, Heredia

Highway system
- National Road Network of Costa Rica
← Route 219	→ Route 221

National Secondary Route 220, or just Route 220 (Spanish: Ruta Nacional Secundaria 220, or Ruta 220) is a National Road Route of Costa Rica, located in the San José, Heredia provinces.

== Description ==
In San José province the route covers Vázquez de Coronado canton (Patalillo district) and Moravia canton (La Trinidad district).

In Heredia province the route covers Santo Domingo canton (San Miguel, Paracito, and Pará districts).
