= Vázquez de Coronado (canton) =

Canton in San José province, Costa Rica

- Canton
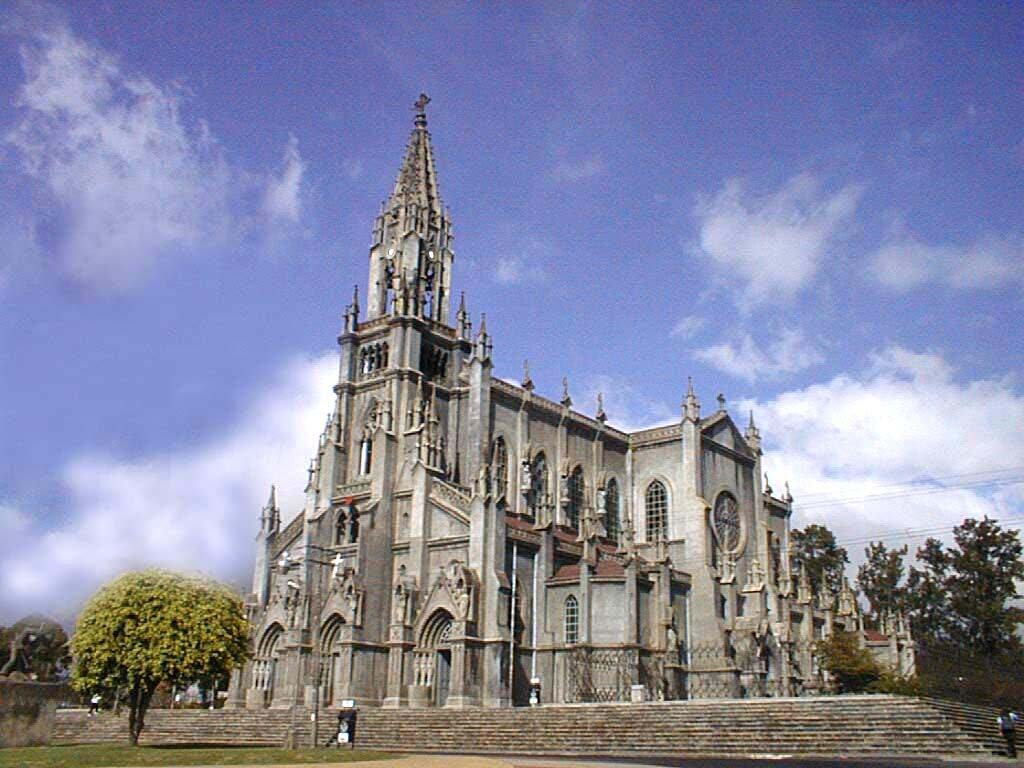
- Church of San Isidro de Coronado

- Flag Seal
- Nickname: Coronado
- Vázquez de Coronado canton
- Vázquez de Coronado canton location in San José Province Vázquez de Coronado canton location in Costa Rica
- Coordinates: 10.0759249°N 83.948042°W
- Country: Costa Rica
- Province: San José
- Creation: 15 November 1910
- Local Celebration: 15 May Saint Isidro Labrador's Day
- Head city: San Isidro
- Districts: Districts: San Isidro; San Rafael; Dulce Nombre de Jesús; Patalillo; Cascajal

Government
  - Type: Municipality
  - Body: Municipalidad de Vázquez de Coronado
  - Mayor: Yamilet Quesada Zúñiga (PLN)

Area
  - Total: 223.93 km^{2} (86.46 sq mi)
- Elevation: 1,414 m (4,639 ft)

Population (2011)
  - Total: 60,486
  - Estimate (2022): 67,078
  - Density: 270.11/km^{2} (699.58/sq mi)
- Time zone: UTC−06:00
- Canton code: 111
- Website: www.coromuni.go.cr

Vázquez de Coronado, and commonly known just as Coronado, is the eleventh canton in the province of San José in Costa Rica, forming part of the Grand Metropolitan Area, notable locations include The Church of San Isidro of Coronado, Braulio Carillo National Park, and Zurqui Tunnel. The head city of the canton is San Isidro.

== Toponymy ==
Named in honor of the first Spanish colonial governor of Costa Rica, Juan Vázquez de Coronado, nephew of the famous explorer Francisco Vázquez de Coronado.

== History ==
The region, much like most of Central Valley, was governed and populated by Huetars, Yorutsí was the chief at the time of Spanish contact, Garabito also controlled the territory after Yorutsí, leading rebellions similar to the ones Pablo Presbere would carry out a century later.

Vázquez de Coronado was created on 15 November 1910 by decree 17, drafted by Ricardo Jimenez Oreanumo, then president.

In 1938, The Municipal palace northwest of the church opens under Leon Cortes Castro, on 10 January 1968 decree 4045 makes San Isidro the seat of the canton.

Zurqui Tunnel was constructed from 16 October 1979 to 1984, with intention to make a fast and easy route from San Jose to Limon, it was opened to the public on September 14 1984.

== Geography ==
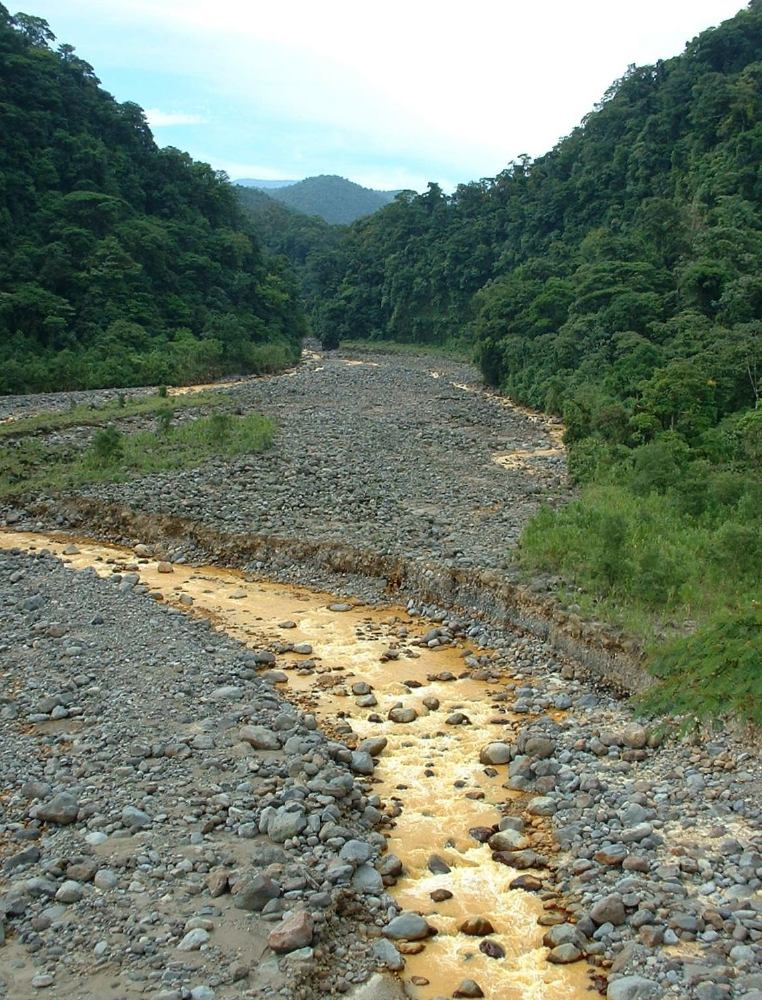
Río Sucio in Braulio Carrillo National Park.

Vázquez de Coronado has an area of 223.93 km^{2} (86.46 sq mi) and a mean elevation of 1,414 m (4,639 ft) metres.

The canton of the highlands rises out of the suburbs of San José to encompass a major portion of the Cordillera Central (Central Mountain Range) and Braulio Carrillo National Park. The Sucio River forms the western boundary of the canton, while the Macho, Zurquí and Patria rivers establish the canton's limits to the east. The northern tip of the canton is marked by the confluence of the Sucio and Patria rivers.

The canton is geologically formed from volcanic materials associated with the Irazú and Barva volcanoes. It has an irregular morphology with soils suitable for agriculture and dairy farming.

Coronado has a maximum altitude of 1,510 m in San Rafael district and a minimum of 1,335 m in Patalillo district. The canton has rivers that descend to the Atlantic seaboard such as Sucio, Patria and Zurquí that also serve as boundaries with the provinces of Cartago, Heredia, and the canton of Moravia respectively.

In the Pacific slope, the rivers Agra, Ipís and the Virilla and its tributaries (Durazno, Macho, Quebrada Varela). The rivers Ipís, Durazno and Macho serve as boundaries of the canton, the first two with Goicoechea and the last with Moravia.

== Government ==
=== Mayor ===
According to Costa Rica's Municipal Code, mayors are elected every four years by the population of the canton. As of the latest municipal elections in 2024, the National Liberation Party candidate, Yamilet Quesada Zúñiga, was elected mayor of the canton with 25.57% of the votes, with Oscar Delgado Araya and Luisa María Vega Matamoros as first and second vice mayors, respectively.

Mayors of Vázquez de Coronado since the 2002 elections
Period	Name	Party
2002–2006	Rolando Méndez Soto	PUSC
2006–2010	Leonardo Herrera Sánchez	PLN
2010–2016	Leonardo Herrera Sánchez	PLN
2016–2020	Rolando Méndez Soto	PRSC
2020–2024	Rolando Méndez Soto	PRSC
2024–2028	Yamilet Quesada Zúñiga	PLN

=== Municipal Council ===
Like the mayor and vice mayors, members of the Municipal Council (called regidores) are elected every four years. Vázquez de Coronado's Municipal Council has 7 seats for regidores and their substitutes, who can participate in meetings but not vote unless the owning regidor (regidor propietario) is absent. The current president of the Municipal Council is the Authentic Farmer's Party of Coronado member María Jimena Alvarado Zúñiga. The Municipal Council's composition for the 2024–2028 period is as follows:

Current composition of the Municipal Council of Vázquez de Coronado after the 2024 municipal elections
Political parties in the Municipal Council of Vázquez de Coronado
Political party	Regidores		
Political party	№	Owner	Substitute
National Liberation Party (PLN)	2	Alejandro Vinicio González Jiménez	Heiner Esteban Baroni Quirós
National Liberation Party (PLN)	2	Ana Yancy Rojas Morales	Karla Marcela Ortíz Méndez
Authentic Farmer's Party of Coronado (PALABRA)	2	Jean Carlo Arroyo Brenes	Michael Mora Solís
Authentic Farmer's Party of Coronado (PALABRA)	2	María Jimena Alvarado Zúñiga^{(P)}	Mildred Campos Sandoval
Social Democratic Progress Party (PSD)	2	Hilda María Zúñiga Lizano	Silvia Méndez Mata
Social Democratic Progress Party (PSD)	2	Harold Enrique Majik Rosales	Keylor Vargas Monge
Social Christian Unity Party (PUSC)	1	Jason Gerald Gutiérrez Lara	David Rojas Rojas

== Climate ==
The canton has high rainfall and a typical mountain climate. Many Costa Ricans traditionally associate this canton with its cold climate.

== Districts ==
The canton of Vázquez de Coronado is subdivided into the following districts:

1. San Isidro
2. San Rafael
3. Dulce Nombre de Jesús
4. Patalillo
5. Cascajal

== Demographics ==
Historical population
Census	Pop.	±% p.a.
1927	4,161	—
1950	6,124	+1.69%
1963	10,615	+4.32%
1973	16,336	+4.41%
1984	24,514	+3.76%
2000	55,585	+5.25%
2011	60,486	+0.77%
2022	67,078	+0.94%
Source: Instituto Nacional de Estadística y Censos; Centro Centroamericano de Población

Vázquez de Coronado was estimated to have a population of 67,078 people in 2022, up from 60,486 at the time of the 2011 census.

In 2022, Vázquez de Coronado had a Human Development Index of 0.801.

== Economy ==
The municipality's main economic activities include dairy farming, agribusiness, coffee and other agricultural production, commerce, tourism and other services. Local businesses include supermarkets, grocery stores, private health veterinary services, banks, clothing and footwear retailers, electrical shops, restaurants and bars.

Braulio Carillo National Park brings substantial tourism.

== Public Services ==
Since the fire that affected Dr. Rafael Calderon Guardia Hospital Nacional in 2005, the Coronado Integrated Health Center serves 24-hour emergency and outpatient. Emergencies of all kinds are served and the center supports Goicoechea and Moravia cantons that do not have emergency services 24 hours, or on Saturdays, Sundays or holidays. Currently the Directorate Medical Center is in charge of Dr. Rojas Cerna, and coordination of emergency services is in charge of Soto Porras, Charpantier and Rivera doctors.

== Institutions ==
The canton of Coronado is home to important institutions such as :

- Inter-American Institute for Cooperation on Agriculture (IICA)
- National Olympic Committee
- Research Institute Clodomiro Picado Twight of the Faculty of Microbiology of the University of Costa Rica, dedicated to research with snakes and serums against the venom of these animals
- Nursing home of the Missionaries of Charity in turn serves as a base of operations in Central America
- Coronado Day Center for Seniors
- Self-Advocates Health Association of Coronado, who owns the Home Institution Saving alcoholic and drug addict Coronado, where treatment is given on additions
- National Council for Scientific and Technological Research (CONICIT)

== Transportation ==
=== Road transportation ===
The canton is covered by the following road routes:

- National Route 32
- National Route 102
- National Route 216
- National Route 220
- National Route 307
- National Route 309
