= National Route 112 (Costa Rica) =

National Road Route in Costa Rica

National Secondary Route 112
- Ruta nacional secundaria 112

Route information
- Maintained by Ministry of Public Works and Transport
- Length: 11.440 km (7.108 mi)

Location
- Country: Costa Rica
- Provinces: Heredia

Highway system
- National Road Network of Costa Rica
← Route 111	→ Route 113

National Secondary Route 112, or just Route 112 (Spanish: Ruta Nacional Secundaria 112, or Ruta 112) is a National Road Route of Costa Rica located in the Heredia province.

== Description ==
In Heredia province the route covers Heredia canton (Heredia district), San Isidro canton (San Isidro, San José, San Francisco districts), and San Pablo canton (San Pablo district).
