= National Route 103 (Costa Rica) =

National Road Route in Costa Rica

National Secondary Route 103
- Ruta nacional secundaria 103

Route information
- Maintained by Ministry of Public Works and Transport
- Length: 3.700 km (2.299 mi)

Location
- Country: Costa Rica
- Provinces: Heredia

Highway system
- National Road Network of Costa Rica
| ← Route 102 | → Route 104 |

National Secondary Route 103, or just Route 103 (Spanish: Ruta Nacional Secundaria 103, or Ruta 103) is a National Road Route of Costa Rica located in the Heredia province.

== Description ==
In Heredia province the route covers Heredia canton (Ulloa district), Santo Domingo canton (Santo Domingo, Santa Rosa districts).
