= Santo Tomás District, Santo Domingo =

District in Santo Domingo canton, Heredia province, Costa Rica

Santo Tomás
- District
- Santo Tomás district
- Santo Tomás district location in Costa Rica
- Coordinates: 9.9784159°N 84.0760575°W
- Country: Costa Rica
- Province: Heredia
- Canton: Santo Domingo

Area
  - Total: 3.51 km^{2} (1.36 sq mi)
- Elevation: 1,200 m (3,900 ft)

Population (2011)
  - Total: 6,267
  - Density: 1,790/km^{2} (4,620/sq mi)
- Time zone: UTC−06:00
- Postal code: 40305

Santo Tomás is a district of the Santo Domingo canton, in the Heredia province of Costa Rica.

== Geography ==
Santo Tomás has an area of 3.51 km^{2} and an elevation of 1,200 metres.

== Demographics ==
Historical population
Census	Pop.	±% p.a.
1883	710	—
1892	810	+1.47%
1927	758	−0.19%
1950	1,163	+1.88%
1963	1,542	+2.19%
1973	2,257	+3.88%
1984	3,171	+3.14%
2000	5,222	+3.17%
2011	6,267	+1.67%
2022	7,440	+1.57%
Source: Instituto Nacional de Estadística y Censos; Centro Centroamericano de Población

For the 2011 census, Santo Tomás had a population of 6,267 inhabitants.

== Transportation ==
=== Road transportation ===
The district is covered by the following road routes:

- National Route 116
