= Patalillo =

District in Vázquez de Coronado canton, San José province, Costa Rica

- District
- Patalillo district
- Patalillo district location in Costa Rica
- Coordinates: 9.9758558°N 84.0231606°W
- Country: Costa Rica
- Province: San José
- Canton: Vázquez de Coronado
- Creation: 11 January 1968

Area
  - Total: 1.97 km^{2} (0.76 sq mi)
- Elevation: 1,335 m (4,380 ft)

Population (2011)
  - Total: 20,349
  - Density: 10,300/km^{2} (26,800/sq mi)
- Time zone: UTC−06:00
- Postal code: 11104

Patalillo is a district of the Vázquez de Coronado canton, in the San José province of Costa Rica.

== History ==
Patalillo was created on 11 January 1968 by Decreto Ejecutivo 03. Segregated from Dulce Nombre de Jesús.

== Geography ==
Patalillo has an area of 1.97 km^{2} and an elevation of 1,335 metres.

== Demographics ==
Historical population
Census	Pop.	±% p.a.
1973	3,511	—
1984	6,025	+5.03%
2000	17,731	+6.98%
2011	20,349	+1.26%
2022	21,161	+0.36%
Source: Instituto Nacional de Estadística y Censos; Centro Centroamericano de Población

For the 2011 census, Patalillo had a population of 20,349 inhabitants.

== Transportation ==
=== Road transportation ===
The district is covered by the following road routes:

- National Route 102
- National Route 220
