= National Route 307 (Costa Rica) =

National Road Route in Costa Rica

National Tertiary Route 307
- Ruta nacional terciaria 307

Route information
- Maintained by Ministry of Public Works and Transport
- Length: 11.515 km (7.155 mi)

Location
- Country: Costa Rica
- Provinces: San José, Heredia

Highway system
- National Road Network of Costa Rica
← Route 306	→ Route 308

National Tertiary Route 307, or just Route 307 (Spanish: Ruta Nacional Terciaria 307, or Ruta 307) is a National Road Route of Costa Rica, located in the San José, Heredia provinces.

== Description ==
In San José province the route covers Vázquez de Coronado canton (San Rafael, Dulce Nombre de Jesús, Cascajal districts), Moravia canton (San Jerónimo district).

In Heredia province the route covers Santo Domingo canton (Paracito district).
