= San Josecito =

District in San Rafael canton, Heredia province, Costa Rica

- District
- San Josecito district
- San Josecito district location in Costa Rica
- Coordinates: 10.0125734°N 84.1118754°W
- Country: Costa Rica
- Province: Heredia
- Canton: San Rafael

Area
  - Total: 1.35 km^{2} (0.52 sq mi)
- Elevation: 1,245 m (4,085 ft)

Population (2011)
  - Total: 11,579
  - Density: 8,580/km^{2} (22,200/sq mi)
- Time zone: UTC−06:00
- Postal code: 40502

San Josecito is a district of the San Rafael canton, in the Heredia province of Costa Rica.

== Geography ==
San Josecito has an area of 1.35 km² and an elevation of 1,245 metres.

== Demographics ==
Historical population
Census	Pop.	±% p.a.
1892	975	—
1927	592	−1.42%
1950	861	+1.64%
1963	2,395	+8.19%
1973	6,024	+9.66%
1984	7,049	+1.44%
2000	10,826	+2.72%
2011	11,579	+0.61%
2022	10,607	−0.79%
Source: Instituto Nacional de Estadística y Censos; Centro Centroamericano de Población

For the 2011 census, San Josecito had a population of 11,579 inhabitants.

== Transportation ==
=== Road transportation ===
The district is covered by the following road routes:

- National Route 113
- National Route 502
