= Santo Domingo District, Santo Domingo =

District in Santo Domingo canton, Heredia province, Costa Rica

Santo Domingo
- District
- Santo Domingo district
- Santo Domingo district location in Costa Rica
- Coordinates: 9.9795411°N 84.0908374°W
- Country: Costa Rica
- Province: Heredia
- Canton: Santo Domingo

Area
  - Total: 0.79 km^{2} (0.31 sq mi)
- Elevation: 1,170 m (3,840 ft)

Population (2011)
  - Total: 4,730
  - Density: 6,000/km^{2} (16,000/sq mi)
- Time zone: UTC−06:00
- Postal code: 40301

Santo Domingo is a district of the Santo Domingo canton in the Heredia province of Costa Rica.

== Geography ==
Santo Domingo has an area of 0.79 km^{2} and an elevation of 1,170 metres.

== Demographics ==
Historical population
Census	Pop.	±% p.a.
1864	2,852	—
1883	2,519	−0.65%
1892	1,980	−2.64%
1927	2,550	+0.73%
1950	2,341	−0.37%
1963	3,608	+3.38%
1973	5,148	+3.62%
1984	5,032	−0.21%
2000	5,181	+0.18%
2011	4,730	−0.82%
2022	4,052	−1.40%
Source: Instituto Nacional de Estadística y Censos; Centro Centroamericano de Población

For the 2011 census, Santo Domingo had a population of 4,730 inhabitants.

== Transportation ==
=== Road transportation ===
The district is covered by the following road routes:

- National Route 5
- National Route 103
- National Route 116
