= National Route 117 (Costa Rica) =

National Road Route in Costa Rica

National Secondary Route 117
- Ruta nacional secundaria 117

Route information
- Maintained by Ministry of Public Works and Transport
- Length: 4.600 km (2.858 mi)

Location
- Country: Costa Rica
- Provinces: San José, Heredia

Highway system
- National Road Network of Costa Rica
← Route 116	→ Route 118

National Secondary Route 117, or just Route 117 (Spanish: Ruta Nacional Secundaria 117, or Ruta 117) is a National Road Route of Costa Rica located in the San José and Heredia provinces.

== Description ==
In San José province the route covers Tibás canton (San Juan, Anselmo Llorente districts) and Moravia canton (San Vicente district).

In Heredia province the route covers Santo Domingo canton (San Miguel, Tures districts).
