= National Route 216 (Costa Rica) =

National Road Route in Costa Rica

National Secondary Route 216
- Ruta nacional secundaria 216

Route information
- Maintained by Ministry of Public Works and Transport
- Length: 13.245 km (8.230 mi)

Location
- Country: Costa Rica
- Provinces: San José

Highway system
- National Road Network of Costa Rica
← Route 215	→ Route 217

National Secondary Route 216, or just Route 216 (Spanish: Ruta Nacional Secundaria 216, or Ruta 216) is a National Road Route of Costa Rica, located in the San José province.

== Description ==
In San José province the route covers Goicoechea canton (Ipís district) and Vázquez de Coronado canton (San Isidro, San Rafael, and Cascajal districts).
