= San Rafael (canton) =

Canton in Heredia province, Costa Rica

- Canton
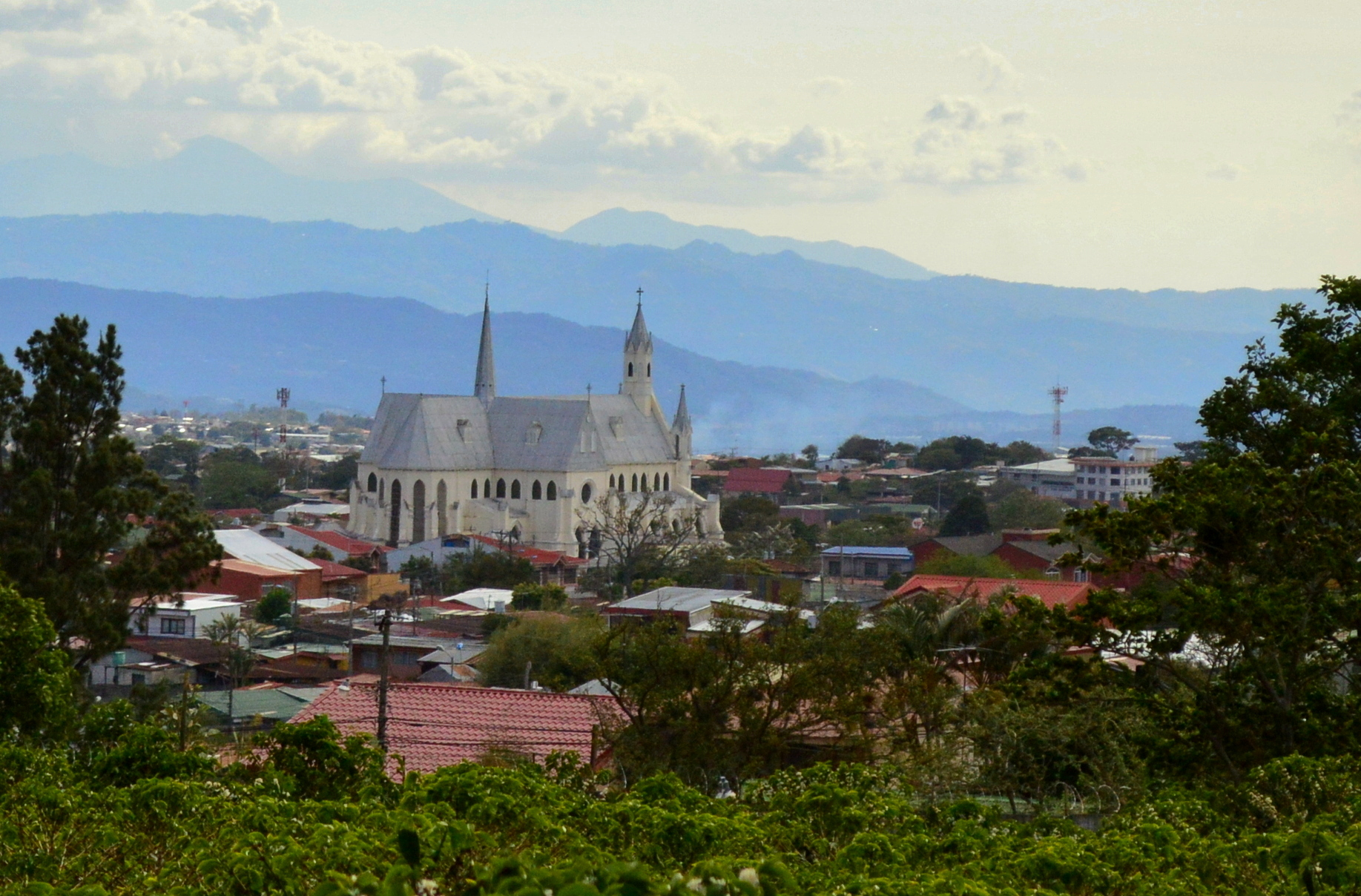
- Skyline of San Rafael city, seen from Ángeles district

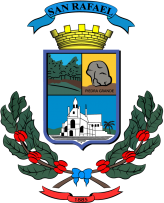
- Flag Seal
- San Rafael canton
- San Rafael canton location in Costa Rica
- Coordinates: 10°02′30″N 84°04′30″W
- Country: Costa Rica
- Province: Heredia
- Creation: 28 May 1885
- Head city: San Rafael
- Districts: Districts: San Rafael; San Josecito; Santiago; Ángeles; Concepción

Government
  - Type: Municipality
  - Body: Municipalidad de San Rafael

Area
  - Total: 48.39 km^{2} (18.68 sq mi)
- Elevation: 1,343 m (4,406 ft)

Population (2011)
  - Total: 45,965
  - Density: 949.9/km^{2} (2,460/sq mi)
- Time zone: UTC−06:00
- Canton code: 405
- Website: www.munisrh.go.cr

San Rafael is a canton in the Heredia province of Costa Rica. The head city is in San Rafael district.

== History ==
San Rafael was created on 28 May 1885 by decree 10.

== Geography ==
San Rafael has an area of 48.39 km^{2} (18.68 sq mi) and a mean elevation of 1,343 metres.

The canton is northeast of the provincial capital city of Heredia, reaching from the suburbs high into the Cordillera Central (Central Mountain Range).

== Districts ==
The canton of San Rafael is subdivided into the following districts:

1. San Rafael
2. San Josecito
3. Santiago
4. Ángeles
5. Concepción

== Demographics ==
Historical population
Census	Pop.	±% p.a.
1892	4,204	—
1927	4,163	−0.03%
1950	5,254	+1.02%
1963	9,069	+4.29%
1973	16,013	+5.85%
1984	22,871	+3.29%
2000	37,293	+3.10%
2011	45,965	+1.92%
2022	48,848	+0.55%
Source: Instituto Nacional de Estadística y Censos; Centro Centroamericano de Población

For the 2011 census, San Rafael had a population of 45,965 inhabitants.

== Transportation ==
=== Road transportation ===
The canton is covered by the following road routes:

- National Route 113
- National Route 116
- National Route 502
- National Route 503
