= National Route 113 (Costa Rica) =

National Road Route in Costa Rica

National Secondary Route 113
- Ruta nacional secundaria 113

Route information
- Maintained by Ministry of Public Works and Transport
- Length: 14.065 km (8.740 mi)

Location
- Country: Costa Rica
- Provinces: Heredia

Highway system
- National Road Network of Costa Rica
← Route 112	→ Route 114

National Secondary Route 113, or just Route 113 (Spanish: Ruta Nacional Secundaria 113, or Ruta 113) is a National Road Route of Costa Rica located in the Heredia province.

== Description ==
In Heredia province the route covers Heredia canton (Heredia district), Barva canton (San Pablo, San José de la Montaña districts), and San Rafael canton (San Rafael, San Josecito, Santiago, Ángeles districts).
