= San Isidro, Vázquez de Coronado =

District in Vázquez de Coronado canton, San José province, Costa Rica

San Isidro
- District
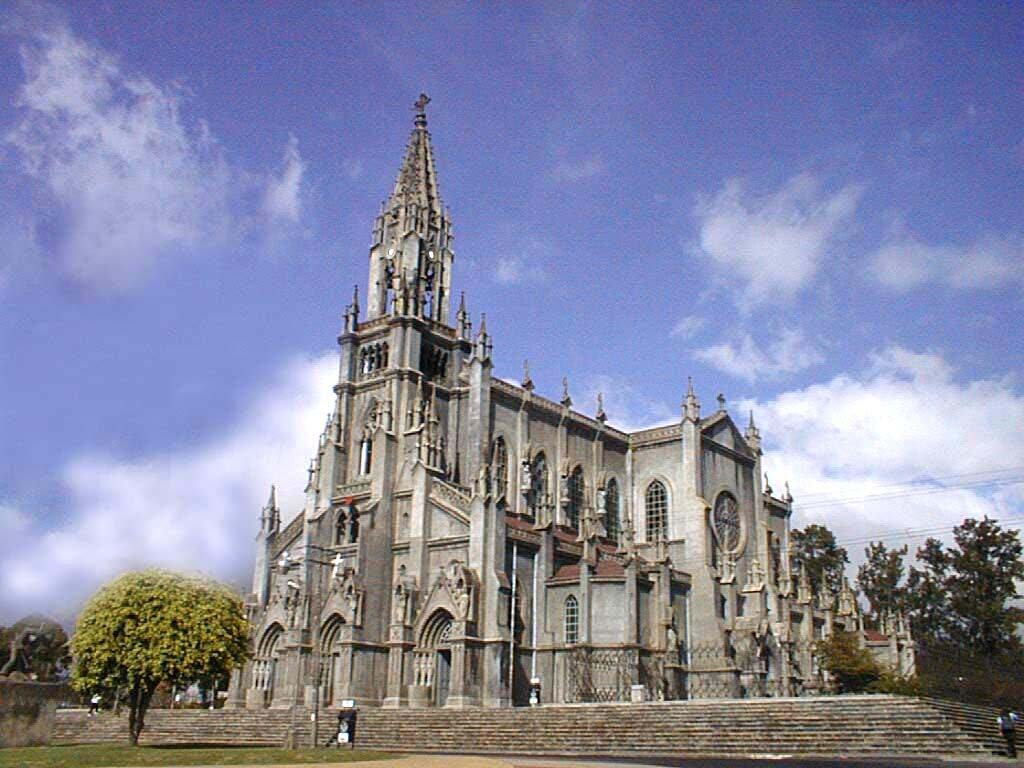
- The San Isidro Labrador parish church
- San Isidro district
- San Isidro district location in Costa Rica
- Coordinates: 9.9736938°N 83.9861212°W
- Country: Costa Rica
- Province: San José
- Canton: Vázquez de Coronado

Area
  - Total: 5.14 km^{2} (1.98 sq mi)
- Elevation: 1,385 m (4,544 ft)

Population (2011)
  - Total: 16,625
  - Density: 3,230/km^{2} (8,380/sq mi)
- Time zone: UTC−06:00
- Postal code: 11101

San Isidro is a district of the Vázquez de Coronado canton, in the San José province of Costa Rica.

== Geography ==
San Isidro has an area of 5.14 km^{2} and an elevation of 1,385 metres. The parish church was designed by Teodorico Quirós.

== Demographics ==
Historical population
Census	Pop.	±% p.a.
1864	1,270	—
1883	1,668	+1.45%
1892	1,971	+1.87%
1927	1,585	−0.62%
1950	2,597	+2.17%
1963	4,607	+4.51%
1973	6,313	+3.20%
1984	9,154	+3.44%
2000	15,570	+3.38%
2011	16,625	+0.60%
2022	18,377	+0.91%
Source: Instituto Nacional de Estadística y Censos; Centro Centroamericano de Población

For the 2011 census, San Isidro had a population of 16,625 inhabitants.

== Transportation ==
=== Road transportation ===
The district is covered by the following road routes:

- National Route 102
- National Route 216
