= National Route 200 (Costa Rica) =

National Road Route in Costa Rica

National Secondary Route 200
- Ruta nacional secundaria 200

Route information
- Maintained by Ministry of Public Works and Transport
- Length: 1.405 km (0.873 mi)

Location
- Country: Costa Rica
- Provinces: San José

Highway system
- National Road Network of Costa Rica
← Route 180	→ Route 201

National Secondary Route 200, or just Route 200 (Spanish: Ruta Nacional Secundaria 200, or Ruta 200) is a National Road Route of Costa Rica located in the San José province.

== Description ==
In San José province the route covers Goicoechea canton (Guadalupe district) and Moravia canton (San Vicente district).
