= San Rafael, Vázquez de Coronado =

District in Vázquez de Coronado canton, San José province, Costa Rica

San Rafael
- District
- San Rafael district
- San Rafael district location in Costa Rica
- Coordinates: 9.9779849°N 83.9542361°W
- Country: Costa Rica
- Province: San José
- Canton: Vázquez de Coronado

Area
  - Total: 16.95 km^{2} (6.54 sq mi)
- Elevation: 1,510 m (4,950 ft)

Population (2011)
  - Total: 7,040
  - Density: 415/km^{2} (1,080/sq mi)
- Time zone: UTC−06:00
- Postal code: 11102

San Rafael is a district of the Vázquez de Coronado canton, in the San José province of Costa Rica.

== History ==
The main settlement of Toyopán, the city of Apaikan, was located in this district.

== Geography ==
San Rafael has an area of 16.95 km^{2} and an elevation of 1,510 metres.

== Demographics ==
Historical population
Census	Pop.	±% p.a.
1927	1,542	—
1950	2,255	+1.67%
1963	3,132	+2.56%
1973	4,470	+3.62%
1984	5,982	+2.68%
2000	6,389	+0.41%
2011	7,040	+0.89%
2022	8,005	+1.17%
Source: Instituto Nacional de Estadística y Censos; Centro Centroamericano de Población

For the 2011 census, San Rafael had a population of 7,040 inhabitants.

== Transportation ==
=== Road transportation ===
The district is covered by the following road routes:

- National Route 216
- National Route 307
