= Museo de Cultura Popular =

Museo de Cultura Popular Popular Culture Museum

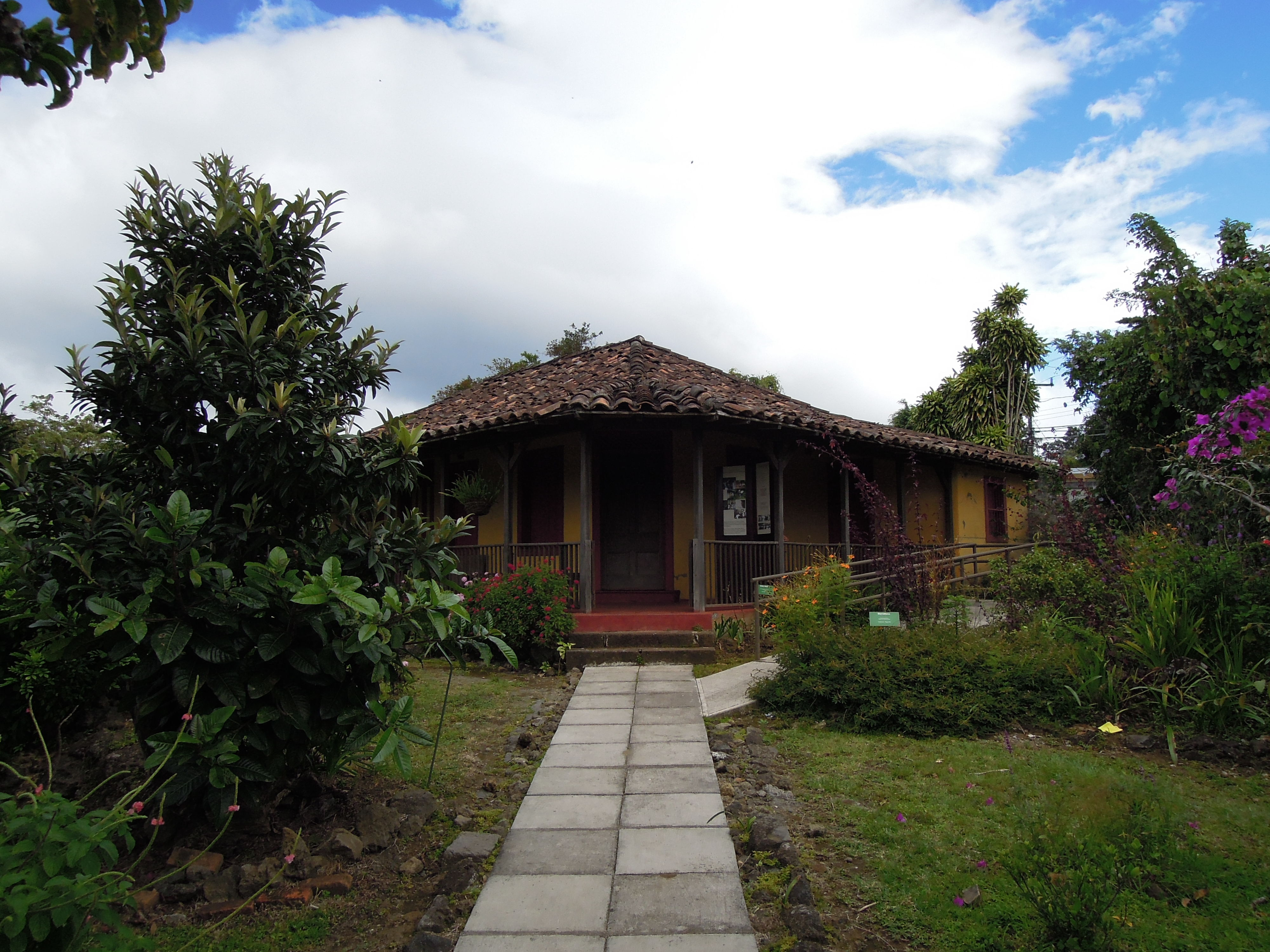
- Adobe home and gardens of former president Alfredo Gonzalez Flores.
- Established: February 1994
- Location: Santa Lucía district, Barva, Heredia.
- Coordinates: 10.017697°N 84.115271°W
- Website: www.museo.una.ac.cr/index.php/es/

Museo de Cultura Popular (Popular Culture, or Folklore, Museum) is a museum in the district of Santa Lucía, just south of Barva, Costa Rica. It is located in the former home of ex-president Alfredo González Flores.

It has a number of notable displays related to the transitional period from late 19th to early 20th century in Costa Rica, demonstrating the fashion and popular culture during this period.

The museum also offers places where visitors can cook easy & traditional recipes from costarrican culture.

It is maintained and curated by the National University of Costa Rica.
