= National Route 309 (Costa Rica) =

National Road Route in Costa Rica

National Tertiary Route 309
- Ruta nacional terciaria 309

Route information
- Maintained by Ministry of Public Works and Transport
- Length: 6.880 km (4.275 mi)

Location
- Country: Costa Rica
- Provinces: San José

Highway system
- National Road Network of Costa Rica
| ← Route 308 | → Route 310 |

National Tertiary Route 309, or just Route 309 (Spanish: Ruta Nacional Terciaria 309, or Ruta 309) is a National Road Route of Costa Rica, located in the San José province.

== Description ==
In San José province the route covers Vázquez de Coronado canton (Dulce Nombre de Jesús district) and Moravia canton (San Jerónimo district).
