= San Miguel District, Santo Domingo =

District in Santo Domingo canton, Heredia province, Costa Rica

San Miguel
- District
- San Miguel district
- San Miguel district location in Costa Rica
- Coordinates: 9.9830038°N 84.0577567°W
- Country: Costa Rica
- Province: Heredia
- Canton: Santo Domingo

Area
  - Total: 5.9 km^{2} (2.3 sq mi)
- Elevation: 1,275 m (4,183 ft)

Population (2011)
  - Total: 6,363
  - Density: 1,100/km^{2} (2,800/sq mi)
- Time zone: UTC−06:00
- Postal code: 40303

San Miguel is a district of the Santo Domingo canton, in the Heredia province of Costa Rica.

== Geography ==
San Miguel has an area of 5.9 km² and an elevation of 1,275 metres.

== Demographics ==
Historical population
| Census | Pop. | ±% p.a. |
|---|---|---|
| 1883 | 769 | — |
| 1892 | 993 | +2.88% |
| 1927 | 1,599 | +1.37% |
| 1950 | 2,035 | +1.05% |
| 1963 | 2,893 | +2.74% |
| 1973 | 2,074 | −3.27% |
| 1984 | 3,176 | +3.95% |
| 2000 | 5,694 | +3.72% |
| 2011 | 6,363 | +1.01% |
| 2022 | 8,038 | +2.15% |
Source: Instituto Nacional de Estadística y Censos; Centro Centroamericano de Población

For the 2011 census, San Miguel had a population of 6,363 inhabitants.

== Transportation ==
=== Road transportation ===
The district is covered by the following road routes:

- National Route 32
- National Route 117
- National Route 220
