= La Trinidad District =

District in Moravia canton, San José province, Costa Rica

La Trinidad
- District
- Interactive map of La Trinidad
- La Trinidad district location in Costa Rica
- Coordinates: 9.9803073°N 84.0365115°W
- Country: Costa Rica
- Province: San José
- Canton: Moravia
- Creation: 24 March 1950

Area
  - Total: 4.94 km^{2} (1.91 sq mi)
- Elevation: 1,265 m (4,150 ft)

Population (2011)
  - Total: 19,767
  - Density: 4,000/km^{2} (10,400/sq mi)
- Time zone: UTC−06:00
- Postal code: 11403

La Trinidad is a district of the Moravia canton, in the San José province of Costa Rica.

== History ==
La Trinidad was created on 24 March 1950 by Decreto Ejecutivo 32.

== Geography ==
La Trinidad has an area of 4.94 km^{2} and an elevation of 1,265 metres.

== Demographics ==
Historical population
| Census | Pop. | ±% p.a. |
|---|---|---|
| 1927 | 445 | — |
| 1950 | 689 | +1.92% |
| 1963 | 1,548 | +6.42% |
| 1973 | 2,654 | +5.54% |
| 1984 | 5,616 | +7.05% |
| 2000 | 13,815 | +5.79% |
| 2011 | 19,767 | +3.31% |
| 2022 | 22,147 | +1.04% |
Source: Instituto Nacional de Estadística y Censos; Centro Centroamericano de Población

For the 2011 census, La Trinidad had a population of 19,767 inhabitants.

== Transportation ==
=== Road transportation ===
The district is covered by the following road routes:

- National Route 220
