= List of Costa Rican provinces by Human Development Index =

This is a list of provinces of Costa Rica by Human Development Index as of 2024 with data for the year 2023.

Rank	Province	HDI (2023)
Very high human development
1	Heredia	0.861
2	San José	0.849
–	Costa Rica (average)	0.833
3	Cartago	0.832
4	Alajuela	0.830
5	Guanacaste	0.820
6	Puntarenas	0.812
High human development
7	Limón	0.793
