= San Vicente, Moravia =

District in San José, Costa Rica

San Vicente
- District
- San Vicente district
- San Vicente district location in Costa Rica
- Coordinates: 9.9636155°N 84.0453507°W
- Country: Costa Rica
- Province: San José
- Canton: Moravia

Area
  - Total: 5.39 km^{2} (2.08 sq mi)
- Elevation: 1,231 m (4,039 ft)

Population (2011)
  - Total: 30,998
  - Density: 5,750/km^{2} (14,900/sq mi)
- Time zone: UTC−06:00
- Postal code: 11401

San Vicente is a district of the Moravia canton, that is located in the San José province of Costa Rica.

== Geography ==
San Vicente has an area of 5.39 km^{2} and an elevation of 1,231 metres.

== Neighborhoods ==
The district of San Vicente comprises the city of the same name and the following neighborhoods (by 2009): Alondra, Americano, Américas, Bajo Isla, Bajo Varelas, Barro de Olla, Caragua, Carmen, Colegios, Colegios Norte, Chaves, El Alto (part of), Flor, Florencia, Guaria, Guaria Oriental, Isla, Jardines de Moravia, La Casa, Ladrillera, Robles, Romeral, Sagrado Corazón, San Blas, San Jorge, San Martín, San Rafael, Santa Clara (part of), Santo Tomás, and Saprissa.

== Education ==
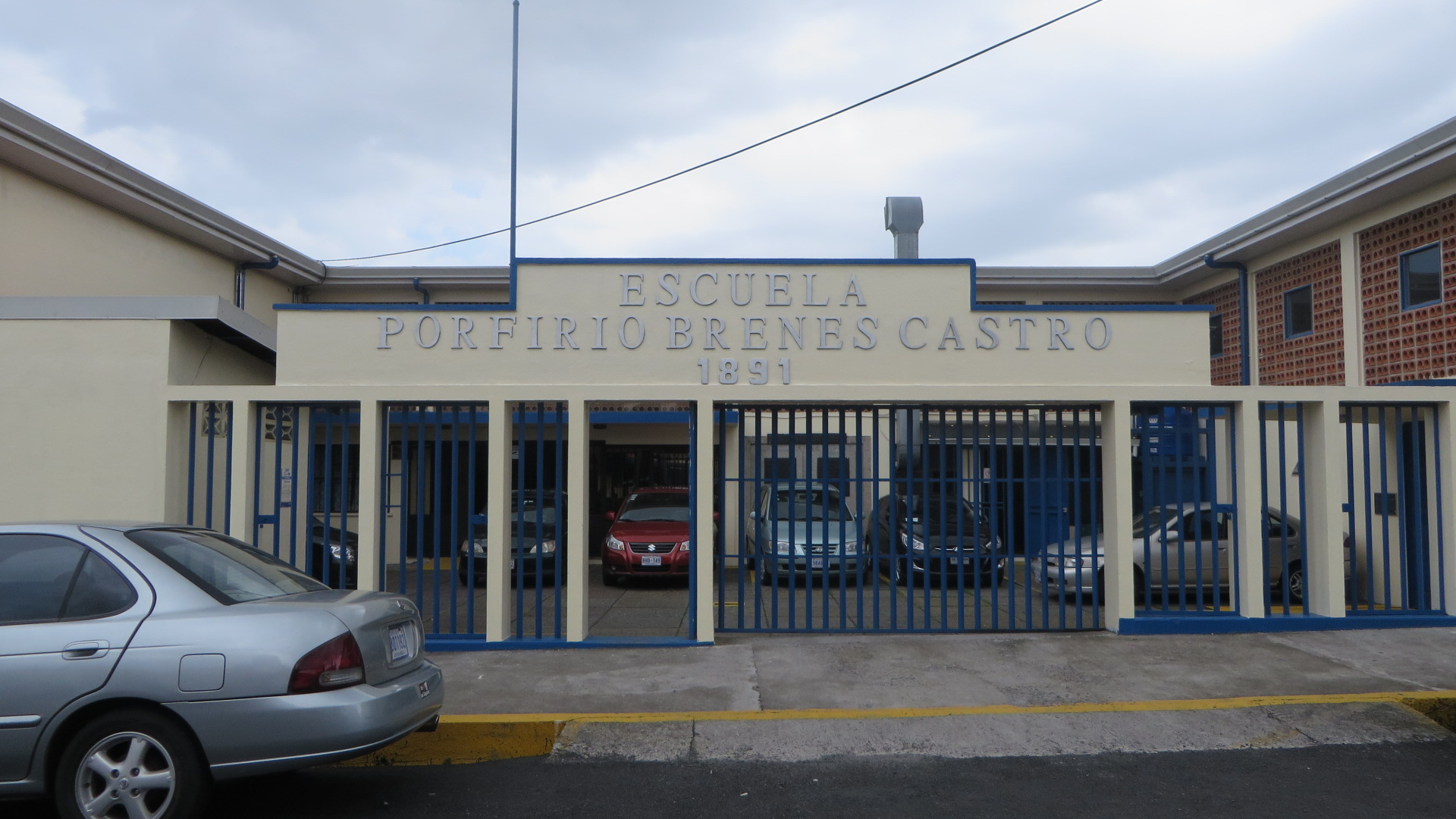
Porfirio Brenes Castro School in San Vicente

The local school for boys and girls, Escuela Porfirio Brenes Castro, was founded in 1891. It is on the south side of Parque de Moravia at the intersection of Calle 63 and Avenida 63. A new school building was inaugurated on 25 November 25, 1961. The school is named after the teacher Porfirio Brenes Castro (28 June 1877 – 12 December 1914).

The Escuela Japonesa de San José is the only Japanese international school in Costa Rica, and is located in San Vicente.

== Demographics ==
Historical population
Census	Pop.	±% p.a.
1864	979	—
1883	1,194	+1.05%
1892	1,664	+3.76%
1927	1,881	+0.35%
1950	4,451	+3.82%
1963	9,188	+5.73%
1973	15,552	+5.40%
1984	24,661	+4.28%
2000	31,693	+1.58%
2011	30,998	−0.20%
2022	29,397	−0.48%
Source: Instituto Nacional de Estadística y Censos; Centro Centroamericano de Población

For the 2011 census, San Vicente had a population of 30,998 inhabitants.

== Transportation ==
=== Road transportation ===
The district is covered by the following road routes:

- National Route 102
- National Route 109
- National Route 117
- National Route 200
