= Santo Domingo, Costa Rica =

Canton in Heredia province, Costa Rica

Santo Domingo
- Canton
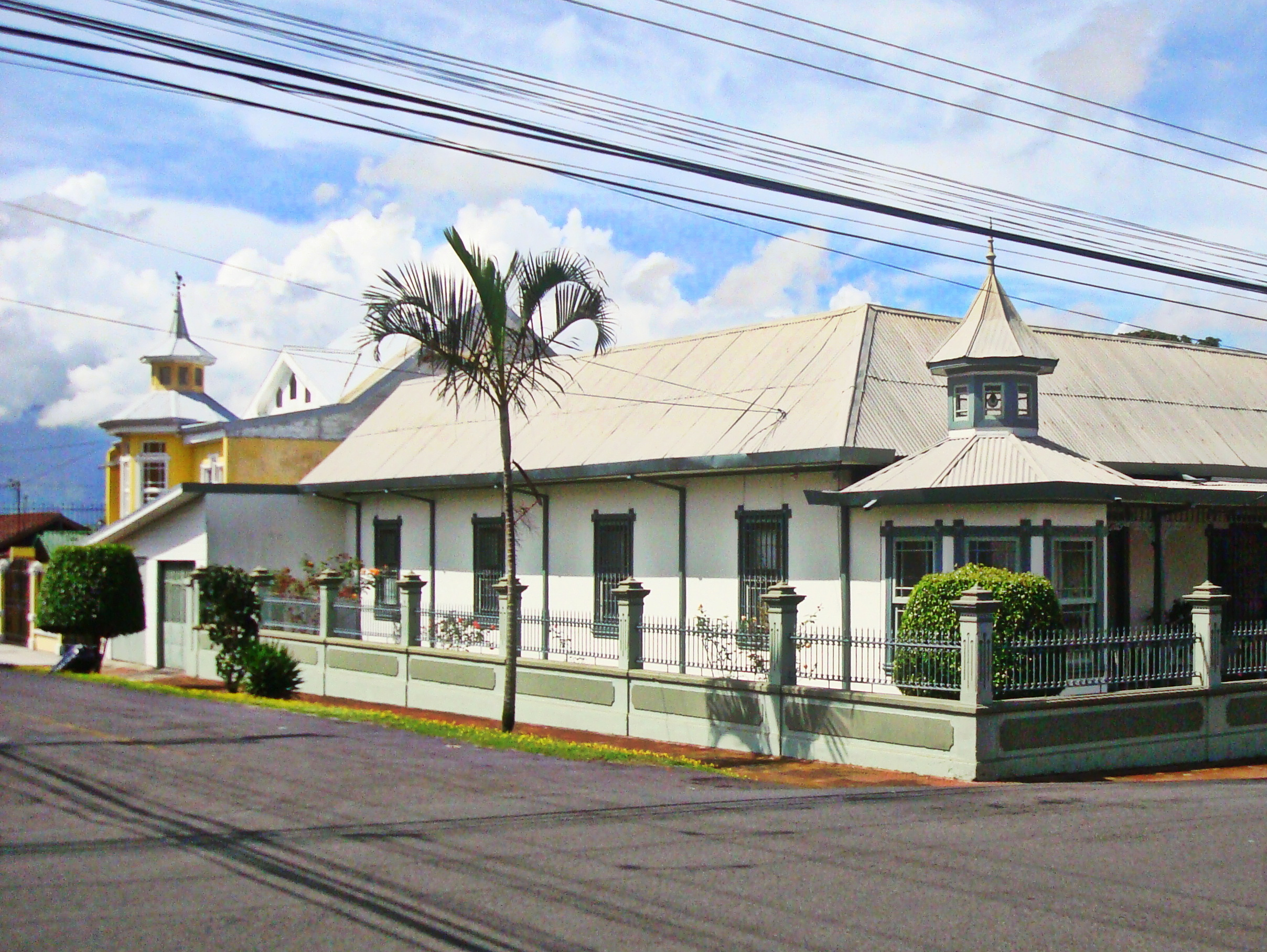
- Architecture of Santo Domingo

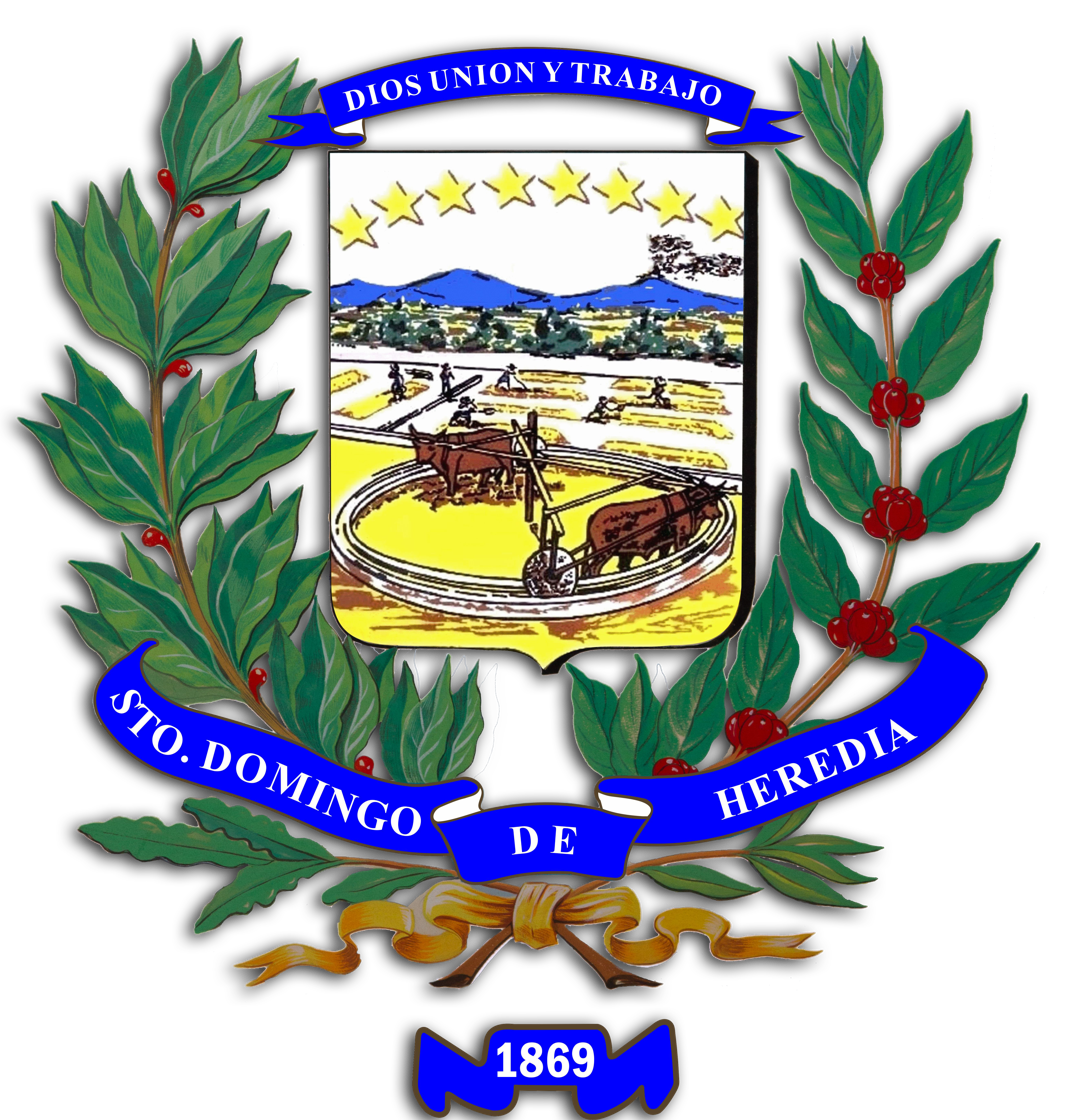
- Flag Seal
- Santo Domingo canton
- Santo Domingo canton location in Costa Rica
- Coordinates: 9.9880112°N 84.0685928°W
- Country: Costa Rica
- Province: Heredia
- Creation: 28 September 1869
- Head city: Santo Domingo
- Districts: Districts: Santo Domingo; San Vicente; San Miguel; Paracito; Santo Tomás; Santa Rosa; Tures; Pará

Government
  - Type: Municipality
  - Body: Municipalidad de Santo Domingo

Area
  - Total: 24.84 km^{2} (9.59 sq mi)
- Elevation: 1,230 m (4,040 ft)

Population (2011)
  - Total: 40,072
  - Density: 1,613/km^{2} (4,178/sq mi)
- Time zone: UTC−06:00
- Canton code: 403
- Website: www.santodomingo.go.cr

Santo Domingo is a canton in the Heredia province of Costa Rica. The head city of the canton is the homonymous Santo Domingo district.

== History ==
Santo Domingo was created on 28 September 1869 by decree 9.

== Geography ==
Santo Domingo has an area of 24.84 km^{2} and a mean elevation of 1,230 metres.

The Virilla River on the south and the Bermúdez River on the north establish the boundaries of this elongated province, which then climb up into the Cordillera Central (Central Mountain Range) with the Pará Blanca River.

== Districts ==
The canton of Santo Domingo is subdivided into the following districts:

1. Santo Domingo
2. San Vicente
3. San Miguel
4. Paracito
5. Santo Tomás
6. Santa Rosa
7. Tures
8. Pará

== Demographics ==
Historical population
Census	Pop.	±% p.a.
1883	4,254	—
1892	5,118	+2.08%
1927	6,089	+0.50%
1950	7,346	+0.82%
1963	11,348	+3.40%
1973	17,423	+4.38%
1984	23,985	+2.95%
2000	34,748	+2.34%
2011	40,072	+1.30%
2022	45,932	+1.25%
Source: Instituto Nacional de Estadística y Censos; Centro Centroamericano de Población

For the 2011 census, Santo Domingo had a population of 40,072 inhabitants.

== Transportation ==
=== Road transportation ===
The canton is covered by the following road routes:

- National Route 5
- National Route 32
- National Route 103
- National Route 116
- National Route 117
- National Route 220
- National Route 307
- National Route 308
- National Route 504

=== Rail transportation ===
The Interurbano Line operated by Incofer goes through this canton.
