= Cascajal District =

District in Vázquez de Coronado canton, San José province, Costa Rica

Cascajal
- District
- Interactive map of Cascajal
- Cascajal district location in Costa Rica
- Coordinates: 10.057939°N 83.9342549°W
- Country: Costa Rica
- Province: San José
- Canton: Vázquez de Coronado
- Creation: 30 November 1988

Area
  - Total: 131.72 km^{2} (50.86 sq mi)
- Elevation: 1,495 m (4,905 ft)

Population (2011)
  - Total: 6,728
  - Density: 51.08/km^{2} (132.3/sq mi)
- Time zone: UTC−06:00
- Postal code: 11105

Cascajal is a district of the Vázquez de Coronado canton, in the San José province of Costa Rica.

== History ==
Cascajal was created on 30 November 1988 by Acuerdo Ejecutivo 429.

== Geography ==
Cascajal has an area of 131.72 km^{2} and an elevation of 1,495 metres.

== Demographics ==
Historical population
Census	Pop.	±% p.a.
2000	6,543	—
2011	6,728	+0.25%
2022	8,342	+1.97%
Source: Instituto Nacional de Estadística y Censos; Centro Centroamericano de Población

For the 2011 census, Cascajal had a population of 6,728 inhabitants.

== Transportation ==
=== Road transportation ===
The district is covered by the following road routes:

- National Route 216
- National Route 307
