= Escuela Japonesa de San José =

Japanese school in Costa Rica

Coordinates: 9.95579°N 84.05952°W

- Japanese: サンホセ日本人学校

Information
- Established: 1967; 59 years ago
- Website: www.escuelaj.com

Escuela Japonesa de San José (サンホセ日本人学校, Sanhose Nihonjin Gakkō) is a Japanese international school in San Vicente, Moravia, San José Province, Costa Rica, in the Greater Metropolitan Area. It is affiliated with the Japanese Embassy in Costa Rica (Japanese: コスタリカ日本国大使館; Spanish: Embajada del Japón en Costa Rica). It is located in Residencial Los Colegios.

In 2003 it had a total of 26 students. The school has a longer school day than schools in the United States and Costa Rica.

== History ==
A predecessor part-time school opened in 1967. The day school opened on October 1, 1974, and a permanent campus opened in 1976.
