= San Jerónimo District, Moravia =

District in Moravia canton, San José province, Costa Rica

San Jerónimo
- District
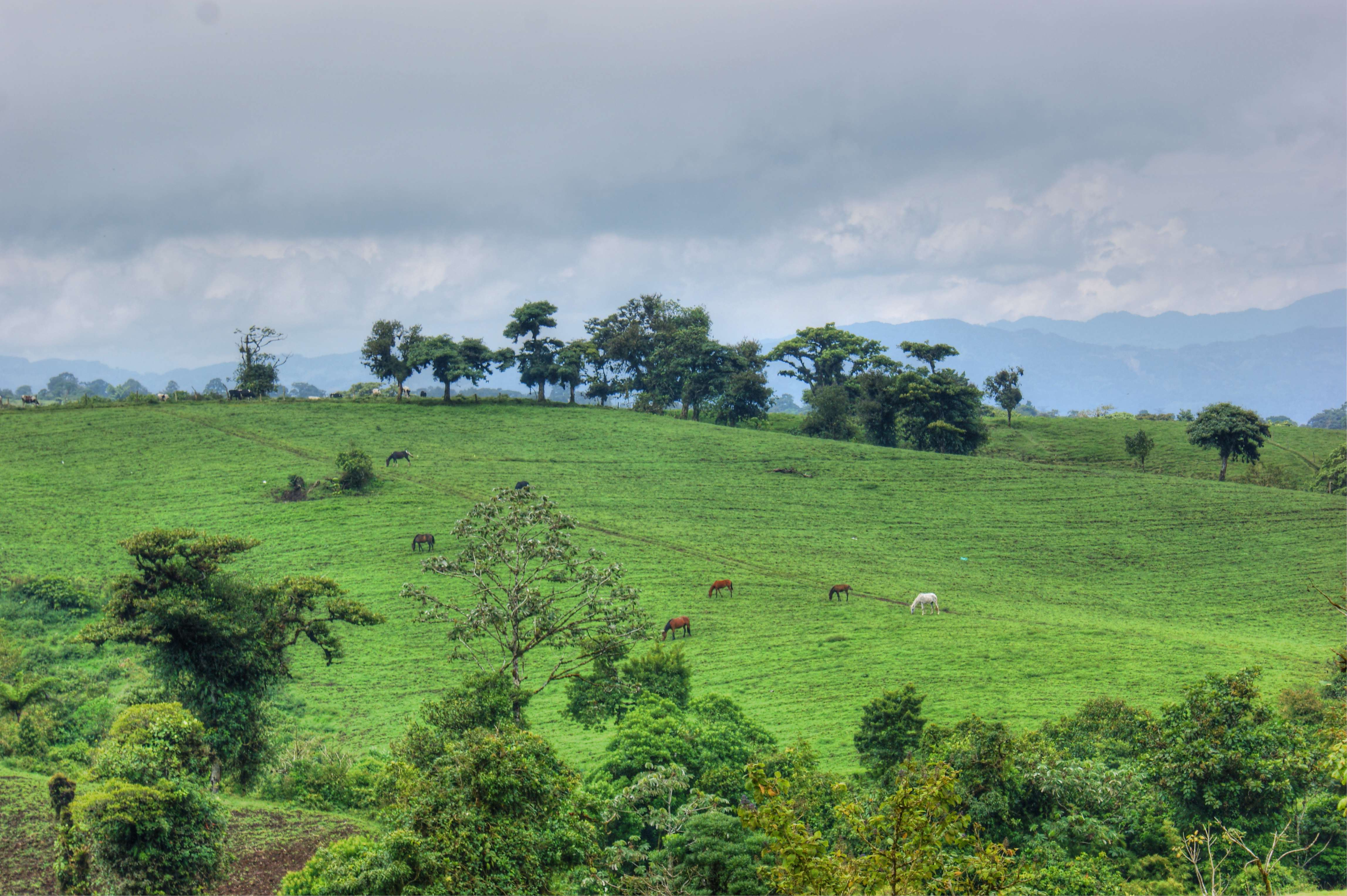
- Pasture in San Jerónimo
- San Jerónimo district
- San Jerónimo district location in Costa Rica
- Coordinates: 10.0274036°N 84.0027275°W
- Country: Costa Rica
- Province: San José
- Canton: Moravia

Area
  - Total: 18.58 km^{2} (7.17 sq mi)
- Elevation: 1,396 m (4,580 ft)

Population (2011)
  - Total: 6,154
  - Density: 331.2/km^{2} (857.8/sq mi)
- Time zone: UTC−06:00
- Postal code: 11402

San Jerónimo is a district of the Moravia canton, in the San José province of Costa Rica.

== Geography ==
San Jerónimo has an area of 18.58 km^{2} and an elevation of 1,396 metres.

== Demographics ==
Historical population
Census	Pop.	±% p.a.
1892	356	—
1927	452	+0.68%
1950	587	+1.14%
1963	906	+3.39%
1973	1,342	+4.01%
1984	2,761	+6.78%
2000	4,911	+3.66%
2011	6,154	+2.07%
2022	8,002	+2.42%
Source: Instituto Nacional de Estadística y Censos; Centro Centroamericano de Población

For the 2011 census, San Jerónimo had a population of 6,154 inhabitants.

== Transportation ==
=== Road transportation ===
The district is covered by the following road routes:

- National Route 32
- National Route 307
- National Route 308
- National Route 309
