= Dulce Nombre de Jesús =

District in Vázquez de Coronado canton, San José province, Costa Rica

- District
- Interactive map of Dulce Nombre de Jesús
- Dulce Nombre de Jesús district location in Costa Rica
- Coordinates: 10.0837555°N 83.9810053°W
- Country: Costa Rica
- Province: San José
- Canton: Vázquez de Coronado

Area
  - Total: 67.86 km^{2} (26.20 sq mi)
- Elevation: 1,345 m (4,413 ft)

Population (2011)
  - Total: 9,744
  - Density: 143.6/km^{2} (371.9/sq mi)
- Time zone: UTC−06:00
- Postal code: 11103

Dulce Nombre de Jesús is a district of the Vázquez de Coronado canton, in the San José province of Costa Rica.

== Geography ==
Dulce Nombre de Jesús has an area of 67.86 km^{2} and an elevation of 1,345 metres.

== Demographics ==
Historical population
Census	Pop.	±% p.a.
1927	1,034	—
1950	1,272	+0.90%
1963	2,876	+6.48%
1973	2,042	−3.37%
1984	3,353	+4.61%
2000	9,352	+6.62%
2011	9,744	+0.37%
2022	11,193	+1.27%
Source: Instituto Nacional de Estadística y Censos; Centro Centroamericano de Población

For the 2011 census, Dulce Nombre de Jesús had a population of 9,744 inhabitants.

== Transportation ==
=== Road transportation ===
The district is covered by the following road routes:

- National Route 32
- National Route 307
- National Route 309
