= San Isidro (canton) =

Canton in Heredia province, Costa Rica

- Canton
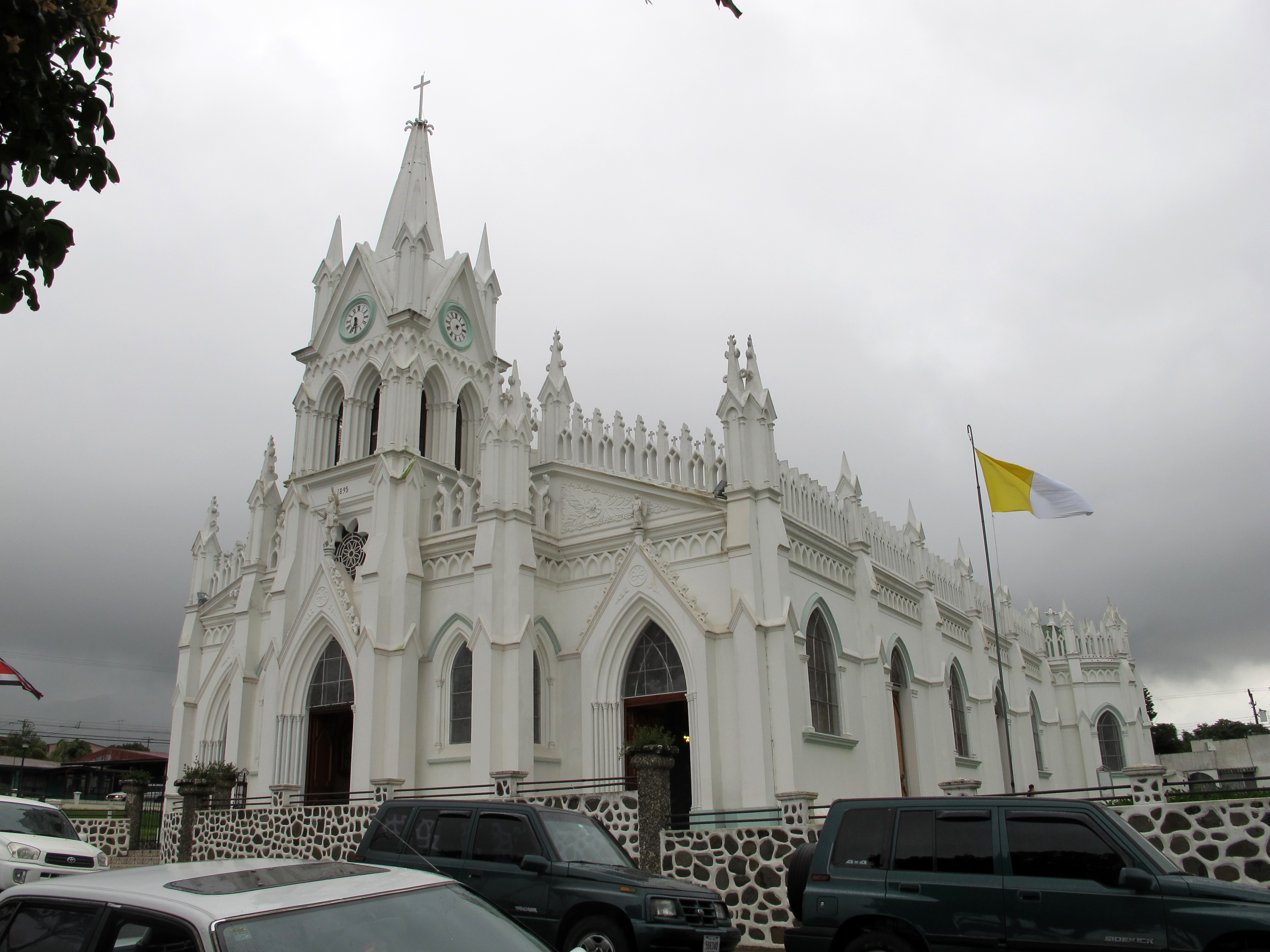
- San Isidro Church

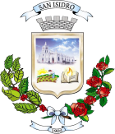
- Flag Seal
- San Isidro canton
- San Isidro canton location in Costa Rica
- Coordinates: 10.0298852°N 84.0431476°W
- Country: Costa Rica
- Province: Heredia
- Creation: 13 July 1905
- Head city: San Isidro
- Districts: Districts: San Isidro; San José; Concepción; San Francisco

Government
  - Type: Municipality
  - Body: Municipalidad de San Isidro

Area
  - Total: 26.96 km^{2} (10.41 sq mi)
- Elevation: 1,337 m (4,386 ft)

Population (2011)
  - Total: 20,633
  - Density: 765.3/km^{2} (1,982/sq mi)
- Time zone: UTC−06:00
- Canton code: 406
- Website: www.munisanisidro.go.cr

San Isidro, also referred to as San Isidro de Heredia, is a canton in the Heredia province of Costa Rica. The head city is in San Isidro district.

== History ==
San Isidro was created on 13 July 1905 by decree 40.

== Geography ==
San Isidro has an area of 26.96 km^{2} (10.41 sq mi) and a mean elevation of 1,337 metres.

The canton is in the highlands northeast of the provincial capital city of Heredia. The Pará Blanca River forms its far northeastern border.

== Districts ==
The canton of San Isidro is subdivided into the following districts:

1. San Isidro
2. San José
3. Concepción
4. San Francisco

== Demographics ==
Historical population
Census	Pop.	±% p.a.
1927	2,744	—
1950	2,849	+0.16%
1963	4,061	+2.76%
1973	5,979	+3.94%
1984	8,528	+3.28%
2000	16,056	+4.03%
2011	20,633	+2.31%
2022	22,806	+0.91%
Source: Instituto Nacional de Estadística y Censos; Centro Centroamericano de Población

For the 2011 census, San Isidro had a population of 20,633 inhabitants.

== Transportation ==
=== Road transportation ===
The canton is covered by the following road routes:

- National Route 32
- National Route 112
- National Route 116
