= Provinces of Costa Rica =

First-level administrative divisions of Costa Rica

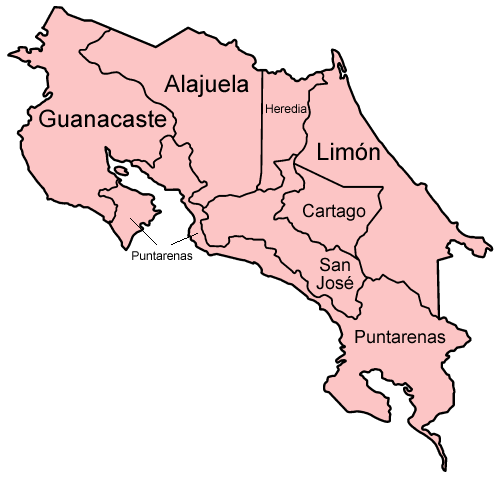
The seven provinces of Costa Rica

According to Article 168 of the Constitution of Costa Rica, the political divisions are officially classified into three tiers of sub-national entities.

== Overview ==
The Constitution of Costa Rica states, "For Public Administration purposes, the national territory is divided into provinces, these into cantons and cantons into districts." The country consists of seven provinces (provincias), 84 cantons (cantones), and 489 districts (distritos).

== List of provinces ==
Flag	Province	Map	Capital	Area (km^{2})	Population	Density (km^{2})	Human Development Index 2015	GDP per capita 2023 (PPP 2015 dollar)
	Alajuela		Alajuela	9,757	885,571	90.8	0.778	19,100
	Cartago		Cartago	3,124	490,903	156.2	0.786	20,000
	Guanacaste		Liberia	10,141	354,154	34.9	0.755	17,500
	Heredia		Heredia	2,657	433,677	163.2	0.807	19,900
	Limón		Puerto Limón	9,176.96	386,862	42.1	0.735	16,300
	Puntarenas		Puntarenas	11,266	410,929	36.5	0.741	17,400
	San José		San José	4,966	1,404,242	282.8	0.792	19,800

== See also ==
- ISO 3166-2:CR
- Cantons of Costa Rica
- Districts of Costa Rica
- List of Costa Rican provinces by Human Development Index
