= Heredia Province =

Province of Costa Rica

Heredia
- Province
- Flag Coat of arms

- Coordinates: 10°25′N 84°0′W
- Country: Costa Rica
- Capital city: Heredia (pop. 42,600)
- Largest city: Heredia

Area
  - Total: 2,656.98 km^{2} (1,025.87 sq mi)

Population
  - Total: 539,598
  - Density: 203.087/km^{2} (525.993/sq mi)
- ISO 3166 code: CR-H
- HDI (2022): 0.833 very high · 1st of 7

Heredia (Spanish pronunciation: [eˈɾeðja]) is a province of Costa Rica. It is in the north-central part of the country. As a result, the province covers areas as diverse as the agriculture-rich Northern plains to the more metropolitan areas such as the city of Heredia in the Central Valley. It contains several major environmentally important areas such as the Braulio Carrillo National Park and the Sarapiqui River. The capital is the city of Heredia.

To the north it borders Nicaragua, to the east is the province Limón, to the south the province San José, and to the west Alajuela.

== Geography ==
The province covers an area of 2,657 km^{2}. The province is home to a variety of environments, including primary forests, tropical dry forests, and montane forests.

== Demographics ==
In 1850, the province had a population of approximately 13,390. As of 2011, it has a population of 433,677.

== Administrative divisions ==
The province is subdivided into 10 cantons and 47 districts.

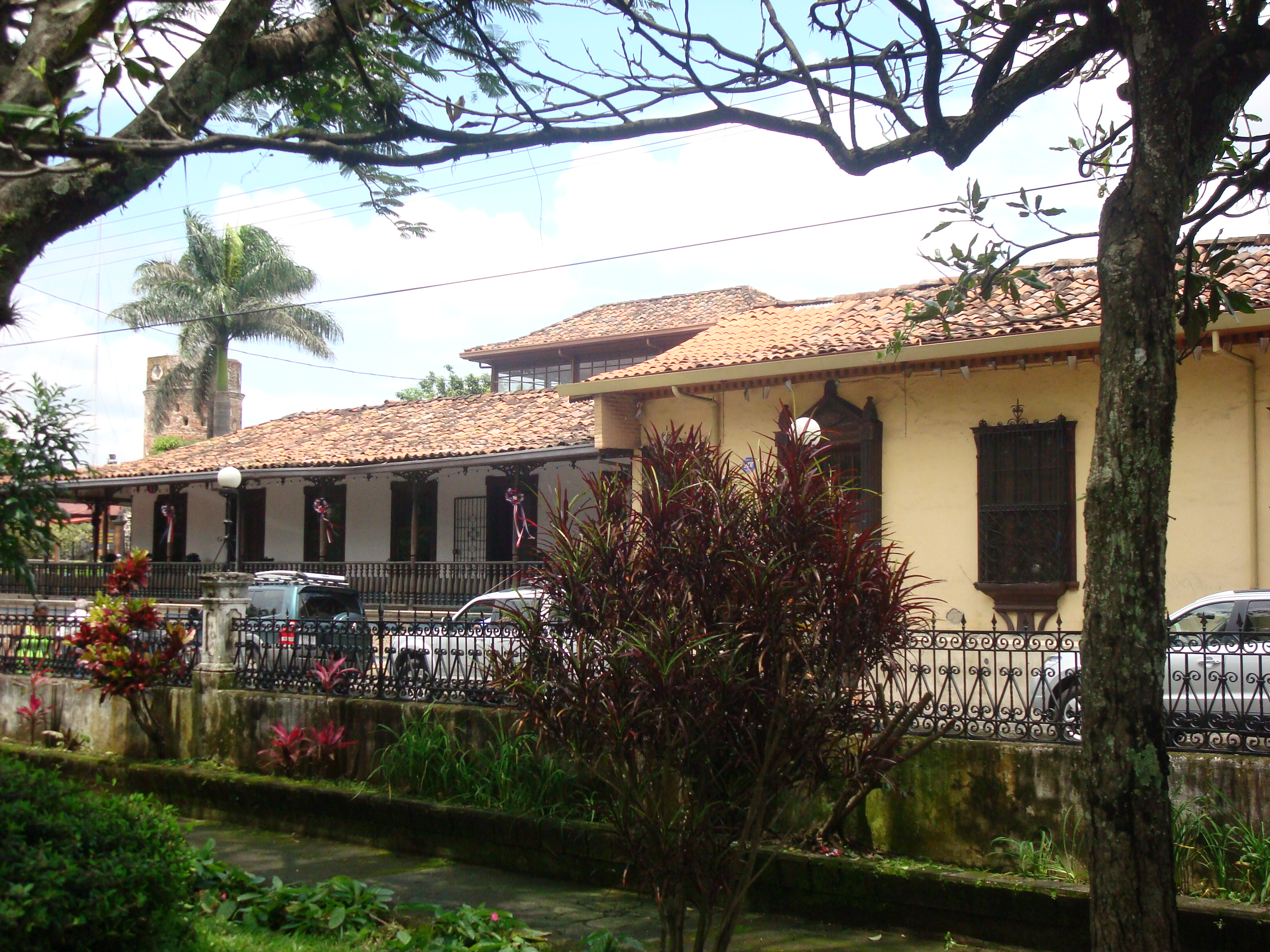
Centre of Heredia

=== Cantons ===
- Heredia (Heredia)
- Barva (Barva)
- Santo Domingo (Santo Domingo)
- Santa Bárbara (Santa Bárbara)
- San Rafael (San Rafael)
- San Isidro (San Isidro)
- Belén (San Antonio)
- Flores (San Joaquín)
- San Pablo (San Pablo)
- Sarapiquí (Puerto Viejo)
