= Bocquet =

Bocquet can refer to:

People

- Alain Bocquet (born 1946), French politician
- Anne Rosalie Bocquet Filleul (1752–1794), French painter
- Bernard Bocquet (born 1949), French cyclist
- Didier Bocquet, French musician
- Éric Bocquet (born 1957), French politician
- Guy Sutton Bocquet (1882–1961), British Lieutenant-Colonel
- Laurent Bocquet (fl. 18th century), French dancer, choreographer and ballet master
- Louis Bocquet (1922–1973), French racing cyclist
- Mlle Bocquet (fl. 17th century), French lutenist and composer
- Roger Bocquet (1921–1994), Swiss footballer
- Roland Bocquet (1878–1956), British composer, pianist and teacher

Other

- Charaxes bocqueti (Bocquet's demon charaxes), butterfly in the family Nymphalidae

== See also ==
- Boquet (disambiguation)
