= 1806 in architecture =

1806 saw significant architectural developments, including the start of the Arc de Triomphe and the completion of several major civic and religious buildings.

== Buildings and structures ==
=== Buildings ===
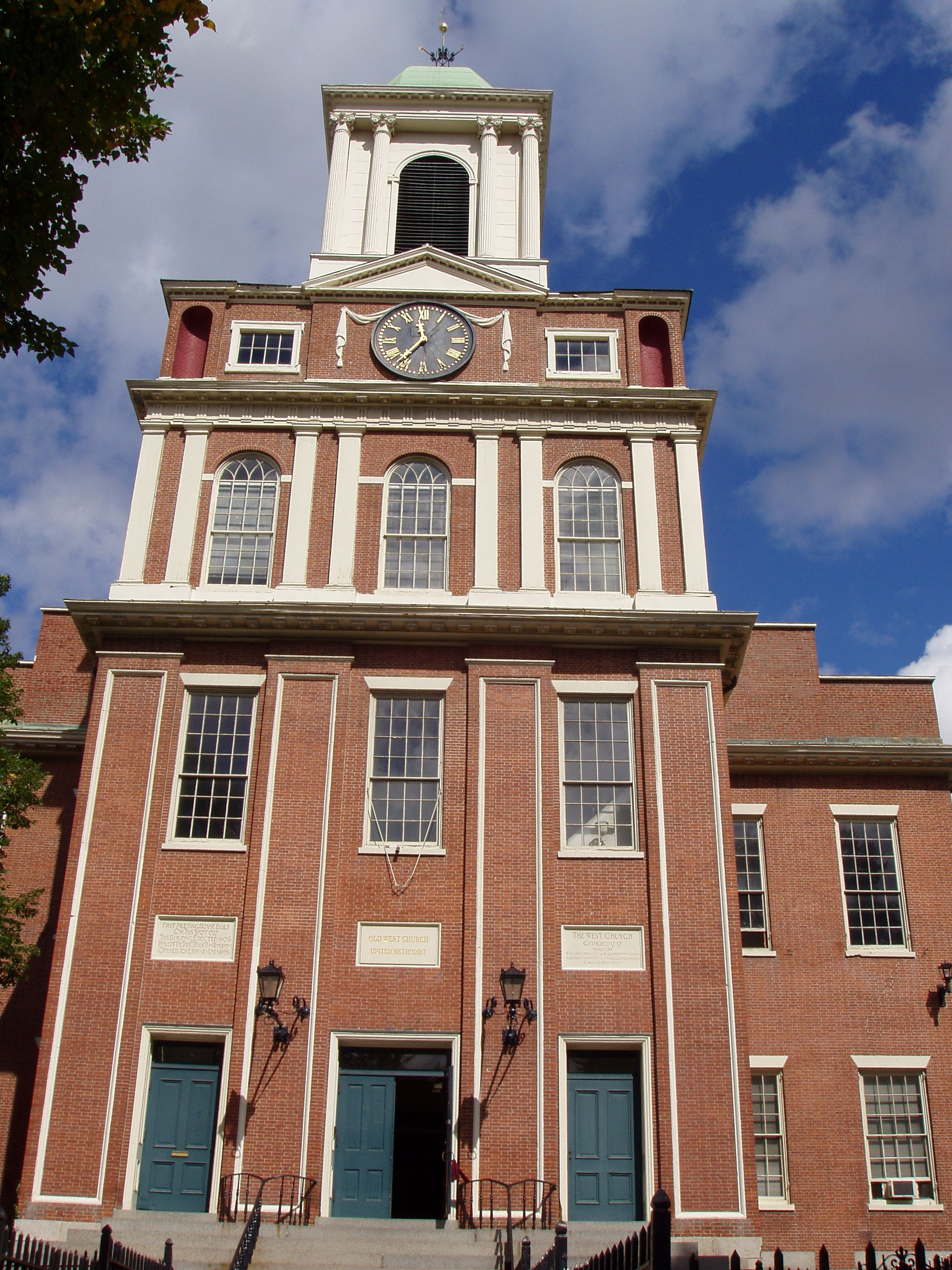
Old West Church (Boston, Massachusetts)

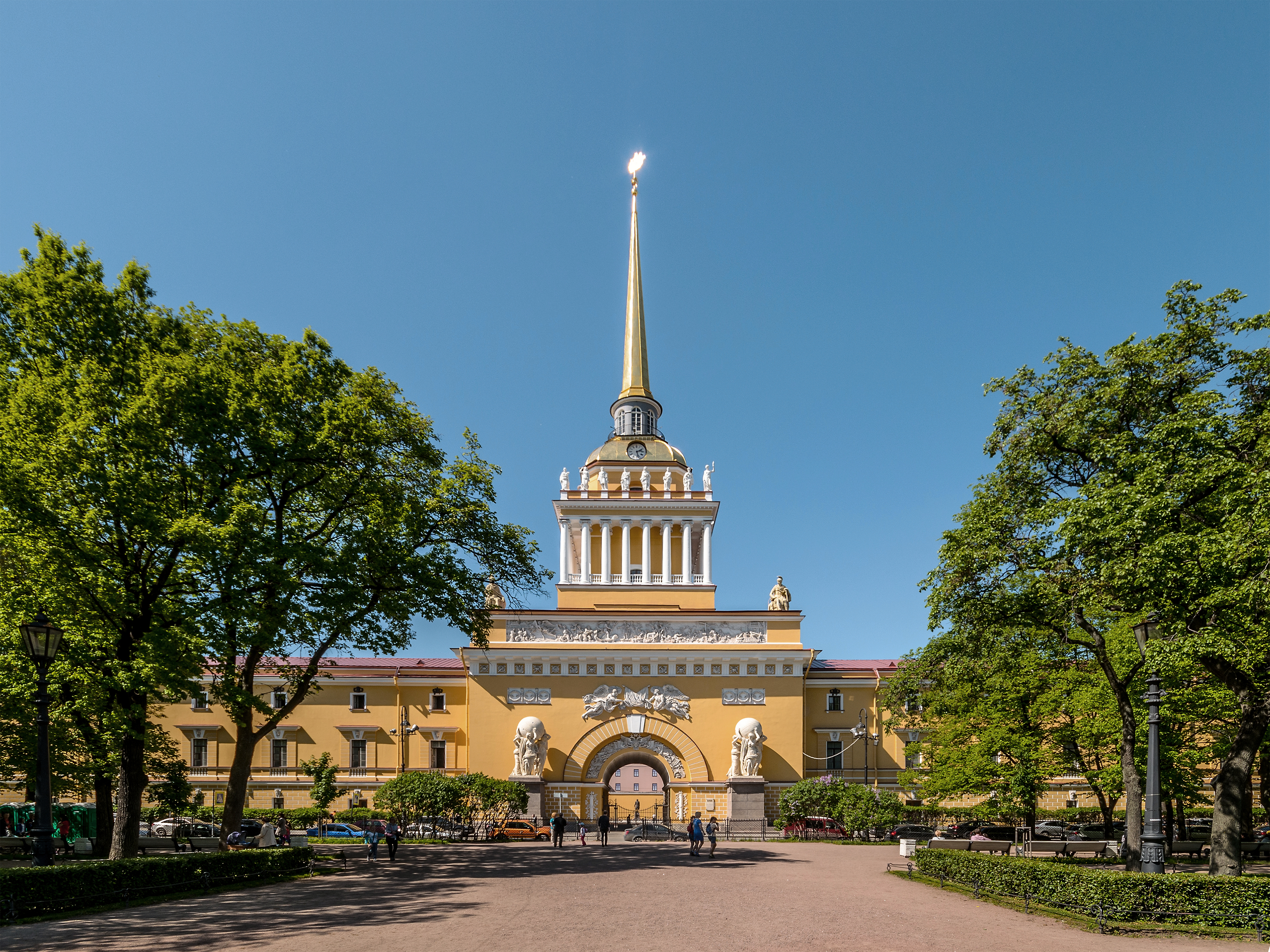
The Admiralty building, Saint Petersburg, Russia

- January 30 – The original span of the Lower Trenton Bridge over the Delaware River in the United States is opened.
- August 15 – Construction work starts on the Arc de Triomphe in Paris, commissioned by Napoleon Bonaparte from Jean-François Chalgrin. Also this year a competition for design of a Temple de la Gloire de la Grande Armée is won by Claude Étienne de Beaumont but Napoleon instead commissions Pierre-Alexandre Vignon to construct what will become La Madeleine, Paris.
- December 1 – The Olympic Theatre opens in Drury Lane, London.
- December 6 – The African Meeting House (Boston, Massachusetts), designed by Asher Benjamin, is dedicated.
- The Old West Church (Boston, Massachusetts), designed by Asher Benjamin, is built.
- The Circular Congregational Church in Charleston, South Carolina, designed by Robert Mills, is completed.
- The Basílica del Juramento de San Rafael in Córdoba, Andalusia, is completed.
- Iglesia de la Inmaculada in Heredia, Costa Rica, is completed at about this date.
- Latrobe Gate to Washington Navy Yard in Washington, D.C., designed by Benjamin Henry Latrobe, is completed.
- Gore Place, Waltham, Massachusetts, probably incorporating designs by Joseph-Guillaume Legrand, is completed.
- Württembergisches Palais in Regensburg, Bavaria, is completed by Emanuel Herigoyen.
- Sándor Palace, Budapest, designed by Mihály Pollack, is completed.
- New Sloswicke's Hospital in Retford, Nottinghamshire, England, is built.
- New Royal Military Academy, Woolwich, England, designed by James Wyatt, is opened.
- The Admiralty building, Saint Petersburg is designed by Andreyan Zakharov; it will be completed in 1823 after his death.
- Rosneath House in Scotland, designed by Joseph Bonomi the Elder is finished.
- Demolition of al-Baqi.

== Awards ==
- Grand Prix de Rome, architecture: Jean-Baptiste Desdeban.

== Births ==
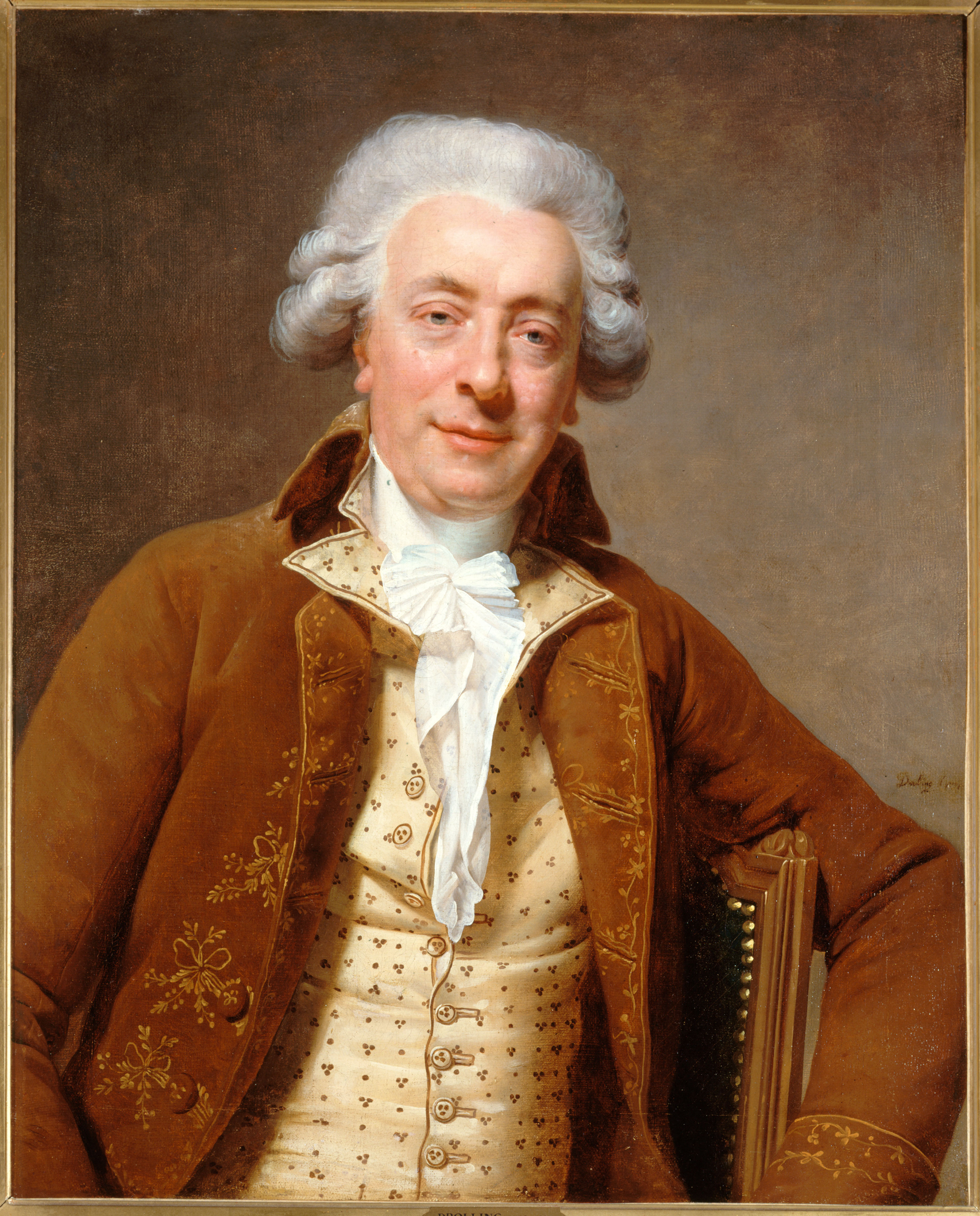
Claude Nicolas Ledoux

- April 9 – Isambard Kingdom Brunel, English civil engineer (died 1859)
- October 14 – Niels Sigfred Nebelong, Danish historicist architect (died 1871)
- November 23 – Philipp Hoffmann, German architect and builder (died 1889)

== Deaths ==
- June 17 – Henry Holland, English architect to the British aristocracy (born 1745)
- November 18 – Claude Nicolas Ledoux, French neoclassical architect (born 1736)
