= Boquet family =

18th/19th-century French family

The Boquet family (surname also spelled as Bocquet and Bouquet) is a French family from Paris, several members of whom distinguished themselves in the 18th century in the arts, particularly painting and sculpture.

== Relationships ==
Guillaume Boquet (1680–1731), manufacturer and dealer of fans, was married to Marie Catherine Luce (1690–1759). Selected descendants include:

❶ Blaise Louis Boquet of Liancourt (1720–1784), painter ornamentalist and fan merchant in Paris, married to Marie Rose Hallé (1721–1794), painter to the King

Ⓐ Pierre-Jean Boquet (wikidata) (fr) (1750–1817), landscape painter, studied with Xavier Leprince (1799–1826)
Ⓑ Rosalie Filleul (née Rosalie Anne Adélaïde Boquet; 1753–1794), painter and pastellist, member of l'Académie de Saint-Luc, concierge of the Château de la Muette; in 1776, married Charles-François Filleul de Besne (1729–1788)

❷ Louis-René Boquet (fr) (1717–1814), designer of the opera costumes, inspector of Menus-Plaisirs du Roi, member of the Paris Opera, married in 1739 in Paris to Marie Angélique Sageret (1720–1773)

Ⓐ Jeanne-Angélique Boquet (1740–1786), costume designer for the Paris Opera
Ⓑ Pierre Louis Boquet (1741–1823), designer
Ⓒ Simon Louis Boquet of Liancourt (fr) (1743–1833), sculptor, member of l'Académie royale de peinture et de sculpture
Ⓓ Blaise Louis Boquet of Liancourt (1746–1795), Judge, then King's attorney at the bailiwick of Soissons (Aisne), librettist, and playwright; married in 1782 in Paris to Pauline Adélaïde Aubrelicque de Saint-Aurin (1759–1820). Boquet, as librettist, Maximilien-Jean Boutillier (1745–1811), as librettist (1745–1811), and Léopold-Bastien Désormery (1740–1826), as composer, wrote an opera, Myrtil et Lycoris, Pastorale, a single act and free verse. It premiered at the Palace of Fontainebleau November 14, 1777, and was first performed by the Palais-Royal December 2, 1777. The Palais-Royal's co-leading role of Myrtil, performed by Étienne Lainez (1753–1822), showcased the French haute-contre voice.

① Caroline Angélique Boquet of Liancourt (1784–1844), married in 1806 to Alexandre Gonsse of Rougeville (1761–1814)
② Charles Pierre Boquet of Liancourt (1786–1832)
③ Blaise-Hilaire Boquet (1792–1851), polytechnician, general of engineers, inspector of fortifications, married in 1817 in Paris to Caroline Nancy Michelot (1799–1857)

ⓒ Louis Henri Boquet (1827–1891), Brigadier General, Chairman of the Military Telegraph Commission

== Bibliography ==
=== References ===
Books, journals, magazines, websites, papers
- Caron, Laurent (1982). Deux Siècles d'Histoire: les Boquet [Two Centuries of History: the Boquets] (in French). Besançon: Laurent Caron, Publisher. OCLC 461628161 (all editions).
- Fabre, Gérard (2004). Joseph Boze, 1745–1826: Portraitiste de l'Ancien Régime à la Restauration [Joseph Boze, 1745–1826: Portrait Painter from the Ancien Régime to the Restoration] (263 pages) (in French). Paris, Martigues: Somogy Art Publishers; Musée Ziem. ISBN 978-2-8505-6768-1, 2-8505-6768-X; OCLC 57965686 (all editions).
1. Via Google Books (Michigan).
- Hennequin, J. René (1911). "La Formation du Département de l'Aisne en 1790 : Étude Documentaire de Géographie Politique" [The Formation of the Department of Aisne in 1790: Documentary Study of Political Geography]. Soissons: Société Académique de Laon. Imprimerie de G. Nougarède, Éditeur de la Archéologique de Soissons. Retrieved July 28, 2024. OCLC 1404787918 (all editions)
1. Via BnF (Bibliothèque nationale de France). 1911.
2. Via HathiTrust (Cornell).
3. Via Google Books (Cornell).
- Jeannin-Naltet, Paul (1917–2006) (1983). Louis-René Boquet, Dessinateur des Costumes de l'Opéra [Louis-René Boquet: designer of the Opera costumes]. Addressed to the Académie des Sciences, Arts et Belles-Lettres de Dijon, November 8, 1983, on the occasion of the 300th anniversary of the birth of Jean-Philippe Rameau. Accessible via Municipal Archives of Dijon: 347771.
- Jeffares, Neil [in French]. Dictionary of Pastellists Before 1800 (PDF). London: The Unicorn Press. Via www.pastellists.com; Retrieved July 29, 2024. Neil Jeffares (2006). Dictionary of Pastellists before 1800. London: Unicorn Press. ISBN 978-0-906290-86-6. LCCN 2006491958. OCLC 68703948. OL 8292578M. Wikidata Q61860041.; LCCN 2006-491958; ISBN 978-0-9062-9086-6, 0-9062-9086-4; OCLC 68703948 (all editions).
- Husson, Georges (1912). "Bibliographie locale" – "La formation du département de l'Aisne, par J.-R. Hennequin" ["The formation of the Aisne department, by J.-R. Hennequin"]. Bulletin de la Société d'Archéologie, Sciences, Lettres et Arts du Département de Seine-et-Marne (March 1910 – November 1911). (see Aisne) (in French). 14. Seine-et-Marne, Melun: Société d'Archéologie, Sciences, Lettres et Arts du Département de Seine-et-Marne. Imprimerie E. Raphard: 328–332. Retrieved July 28, 2024. LCCN 10-7015; OCLC 502425797 (all editions), OCLC 763574669 (all editions).
1. Via Google Books (Harvard).
- Husson, Georges (1916). "Les Boquet de Liancourt et Chevalier de Rougeville" [The Boquets of Liancourt and Chevaliers of Rougeville]. Annales de la Société Historique et Archéologique de Château-Thierry [Annals of the Historical and Archaeological Society of Château-Thierry] ("Travaux & Rapports Présentes Aux Séances l'Année 1913") (in French). Château-Thierry: Imprimerie Moderne – Société de l'Écho Républician de l'Aisne: 58–64 – via Bibliothèque nationale de France. ISSN 1770-698X; OCLC 16702755 (all editions).
1. Via BnF (Bibliothèque nationale de France). 1913.
2. Via Google Books (Cal Berkeley).
- Lamarque, Jean Maximilien (1770–1832); Fririon, Baron François Nicolas Mathus (1766–1840), eds. (1850). "Notice Nécrologique Sur le Général Boquet, Inspecteur Général du Génie, Membre du Comité des Fortifications, par M. Le Général d'Artois" [Obituary Notice on General Boquet, Inspector General of Engineers, Member of the Fortifications Committee, by Mr. General d'Artois]. Le Spectateur Militaire: Recueil de Science, d'Art et d'Histoire Militaires (in French). Vol. 1850. pp. 600–607. Retrieved August 2, 2024. ISSN 2020-6496; OCLC 6408879 (all editions), OCLC 243893386 (all editions).
1. Via HathiTrust (Harvard).
2. Via Google Books (Harvard).
- Marriage License: Louis Filleul and Anne Rosalie Boquet (digital image 389 of 1803). Document: Marriage Contract. Marriage Date: September 22, 1777. Location: Paris. Stored at Archives Nationales; Minutier Central of Paris; Actes en Vrac – via Geneanet.
- "Notice Sur le Général Louis Henri Boquet, Grand Officier de la Légion d'Honneur" ... "Mort à Lyon le 22 Juin 1891" ["Notice on General Louis-Henri Boquet, Grand Officer of the Legion of Honor" ... "Died in Lyon, June 22, 1891"] (8°) (in French). Bourg: Imprimerie de J.-M. Villefranche (Jacques-Melchior Villefranche; 1829–1904). 1893. OCLC 461661926 (all editions).
- Opera Program: Myrtil et Lycoris, Pastorale en un Acte ... Représentée pour la première fois par l'Académie Royale de Musique le Mardi 2 Décembre 1777 et Reprise le 25 Avril 1779 [Myrtil and Lycoris, Pastoral in One Act ... Performed for the first time by the Royal Academy of Music on Tuesday, December 2, 1777, and revived on April 25, 1779].
1. Via BnF (Bibliothèque nationale de France). 1779.
- Opera Program: Myrtil et Lycoris, Pastorale (représentée devant Leurs Majestés à Choisy, en septembre 1778 [Performed before Their Majesties at Choisy, in September 1778]). 1778. Désormery, Léopold-Bastien → ISNI 0000000033680779; BnF 14820921
1. Via BnF (Bibliothèque nationale de France). 1778.
2. Via Google Books (Bavarian State Library).
- Piot, Albane Marie Pascale (September 2014). "Recherches sur Louis-René Boquet (1717–1814)" (research paper in art history applied to collections) (in French). École du Louvre. HAL Open Access via dumas-01221519.
- Pitou, Spire John James, PhD (1912–1985) (1980) [1983; 1985; 1990]. The Paris Opéra: An Encyclopedia of Operas, Ballets, Composers, and Performers. Rococo and Romantic, 1715–1815. New York: Greenwood Press. London: Bloomsbury Publishing. Accessible via EBSCO.
1. LCCN 82-21140
2. ISBN 978-0-3132-1420-2, 0-3132-1420-4. Vol. 1: Genesis and Glory, 1671–1715 (December 28, 1983; 364 pages).
3. ISBN 978-0-3132-4394-3, 0-3132-4394-8. Vol. 2: Rococo and Romantic, 1715–1815 (July 24, 1985; 619 pages).
4. ISBN 978-0-3132-7782-5, 0-3132-7782-6. Vol. 3: Growth and Grandeur, 1815–1914 "A–L" (November 12, 1990; 816 pages).
5. ISBN 978-0-3132-7783-2, 0-3132-7783-4. Vol. 3: Growth and Grandeur, 1815–1914 "M–Z" (November 12, 1990; 768 pages).
6. ISBN 978-0-3132-6218-0, 0-3132-6218-7. Vol. 3: Growth and Grandeur, 1815–1914 (November 13, 1990; 1608 pages).
7. OCLC 9081672 (all editions).
  1. Vol. 2: Rococo and Romantic, 1715–1815. "Myrtil et Lycoris" (preview only) – via RILM.
- Vadot, Anne-Marie (née Anne-Marie Jamon; 1923–2024); Vadot, Louis Pierre (1914–1999) (1996). Histoire des Familles Guerrin et Nicolas de Meissas [History of the Guerin and Nicolas de Meissas Families].
- Valynseele, Joseph (1924–1997) [in French]; Brun, Christophe (1967– ) (1992). Les Bâtards de Louis XV et Leur Descendance [The Bastards of Louis XV and Their Descendants] (in French). Paris: Éditions Perrin. LCCN 92-147630; Series: Collection → Vérités et Légendes ISSN 0981-7859; ISBN 978-2-2620-0672-3, 2262-0-0672-5; OCLC 26404699 (all editions), OCLC 1009787729 (all editions).

== See also ==
- Académie royale de peinture et de sculpture
- Académie royale de musique
