= Heredia =

Heredia may refer to:

== Places ==
- Heredia, Costa Rica, a city
- Heredia (canton), Costa Rica
- Heredia Province, Costa Rica
- Heredia, Álava, Spain

== Other uses ==
- Heredia (etymology)
- Heredia (surname)
- Heredia (moth), a genus of moth
- Heredia Jaguares de Peten a football (soccer) team from San José, El Petén, Guatemala
- Heredia, a meteorite spotted in 1857, see meteorite falls

== See also ==
- Hereditas, a scientific journal in genetics
