= Boquet =

Boquet may refer to:

== People ==
- Alfred Boquet (1879–1947), French veterinarian and biologist
- Anne Boquet (born 1952), French senior civil servant
- Jeanne-Angélique Boquet (1717–1814), was a French artist
- Boquet family

== Places ==
- Boquet, Pennsylvania, U.S. unincorporated community in Westmoreland County, Pennsylvania state
- Boquet River, U.S. river in New York State (spelled "Bouquet River" on maps prior to 1982)

== See also ==
- Bocquet (disambiguation)
- Bouquet (disambiguation)
