= Eduardo Noriega =

Eduardo Noriega may refer to:

- Eduardo Noriega (Mexican actor) (1916–2007), Mexican film actor
- Eduardo Noriega (Spanish actor) (born 1973), Spanish film actor
