= Caserne d'Artois =

Military installation in Versailles, France

Caserne d'Artois / Quartier d'Artois
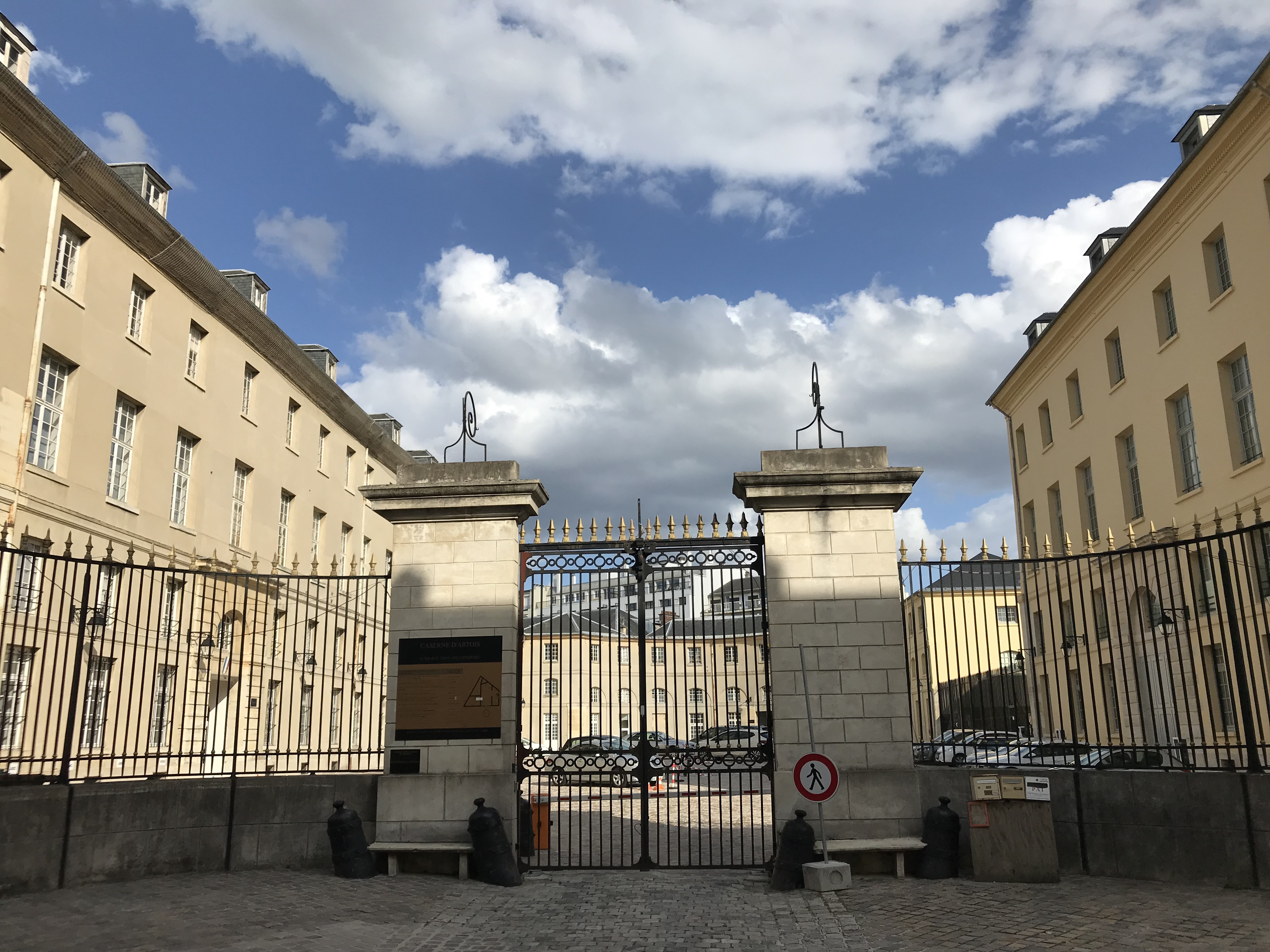

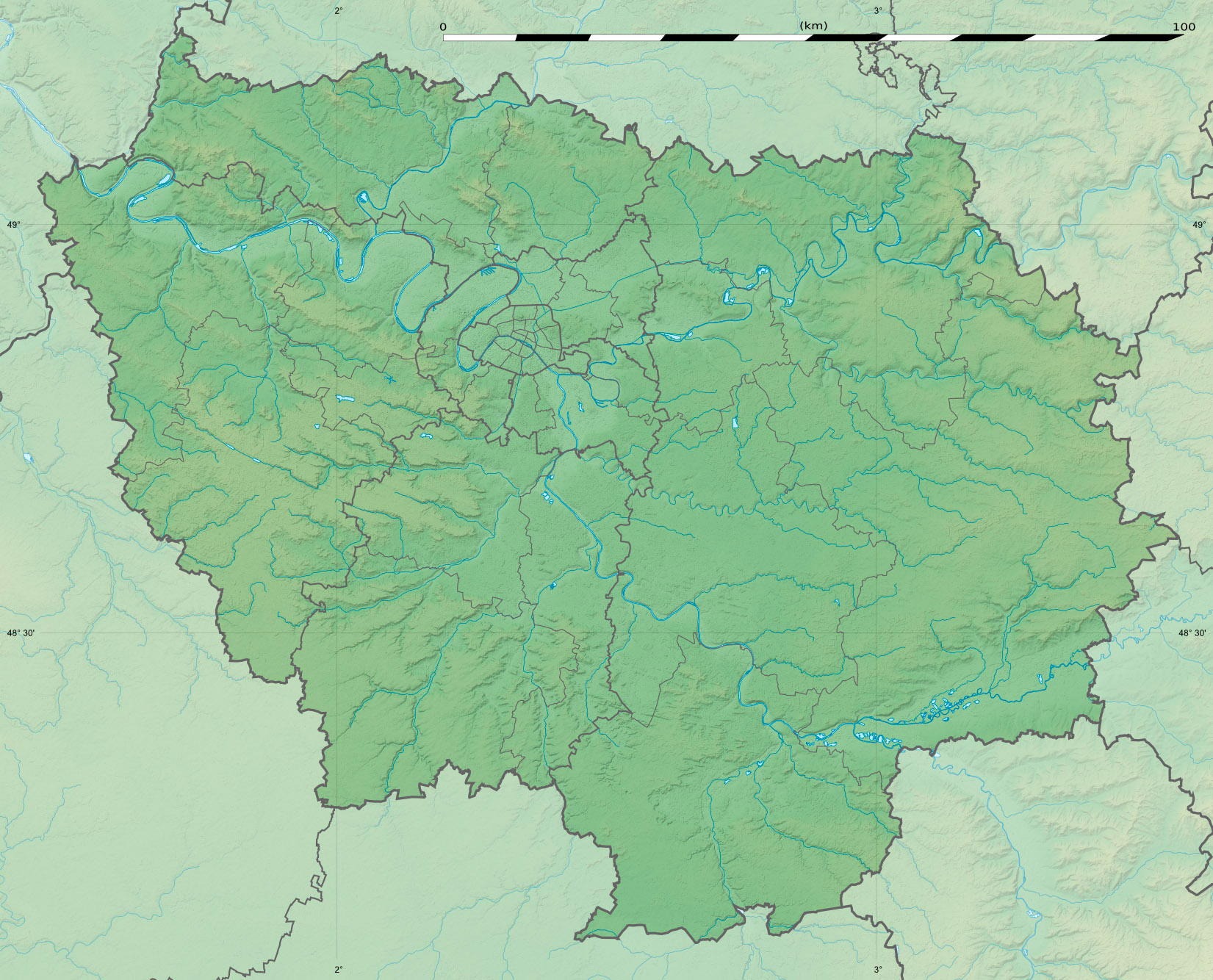
- Location within Île-de-France (region)
- 48°47′53″N 2°07′59″E
- Type: Barracks
- Location: 9 ter, rue Édouard-Lefèbvre; Versailles, Île-de-France

History
- Built: 1773–1776

Site notes
- Architect: Jean Chalgrin
- Owner: Ministry of the Armies

Monument historique
- Designated: March 23, 1927
- Reference no.: PA00087771

The Caserne d'Artois or the Quartier d'Artois is a military installation in the city of Versailles, France. Some of its façades are listed as Historical Monuments.

== History ==
The facility was built by architect Jean Chalgrin between 1773 and 1776 on the camp des Fainénants, a vacant lot that was outside the city boundary until 1773. It was originally set to be the stable of the earl of Artois, the brother of Louis XIV who then became King Charles X.

After the Revolution, the buildings were transformed into barracks that could accommodate 333 cavalry men and 530 infantrymen, as well as 224 horses. In November 1823, a royal order established a cavalry school and a trumpet school in the buildings. The schools were later transferred to Saumur, Maine-et-Loire in November 1824.

The street façades of the caserne d'Artois were registered as Historical Monuments on March 23, 1927.
