= Jean-Arnaud Raymond =

French architect (1742–1811)

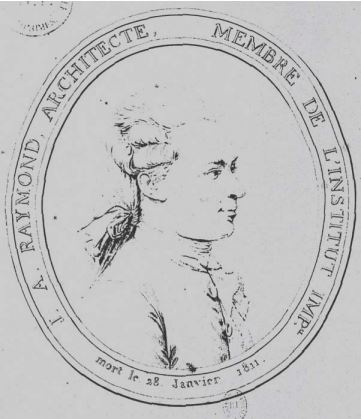
Jean-Arnaud Raymond; from Projet d’un arc de triomphe (1812)

Jean-Arnaud Raymond (4 April 1742, Toulouse - 28 January 1811, Paris) was a French architect in the Palladian style.

== Biography ==
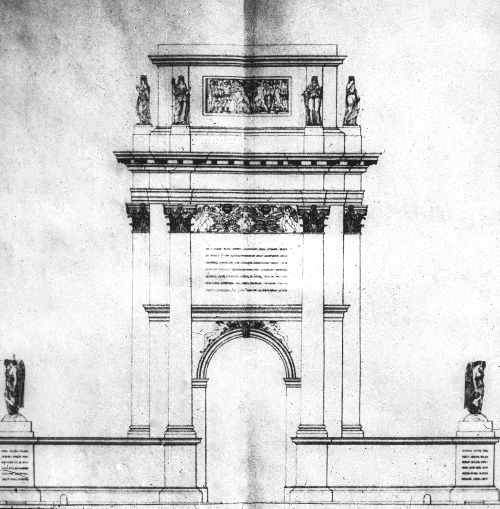
Drawing for the proposed Arc de Triomphe

He was born to a family of carpenters. In 1759, he began his architectural studies at the new Académie de Toulouse, then went to Paris, where he attended the Académie Royale d'Architecture, under the direction of Jacques-François Blondel and Jacques-Germain Soufflot.

He won the Prix de Rome in 1766, with his design for the portal of a cathedral, then spent eight years in Italy where he developed a strong attachment to the work of Andrea Palladio. On his way back to Paris, he was appointed architect for the Estates of Languedoc. In this capacity, he directed work on the Promenade du Peyrou in Montpellier.

In 1783, he was called to the reconstruction site of the Notre-Dame-de-Prouille Monastery, to proceed with interior alterations that had been started in 1746 by Jacques Hardouin-Mansart de Sagonne. The work was completed from 1785 to 1787. During this time, in 1784, he was admitted to the Académie d'Architecture (the Académie Royale's successor) and was one of the founding members of the Institut de France

He was elected to the Académie des Beaux-Arts in 1795, becoming the first person to occupy Seat #6 for architecture. Three years later, he was named Chief Architect for the Palais du Louvre. In 1806, he and Jean-François Chalgrin were placed in charge of planning the Arc de Triomphe, but the incompatibility of their proposals led to a conflict that forced Raymond to resign. Neither lived to see the project in its final form.
