= Marguerite Émilie Chalgrin =

French painter and illustrator (1760–1794)

Marguerite Émilie Félecité Chalgrin
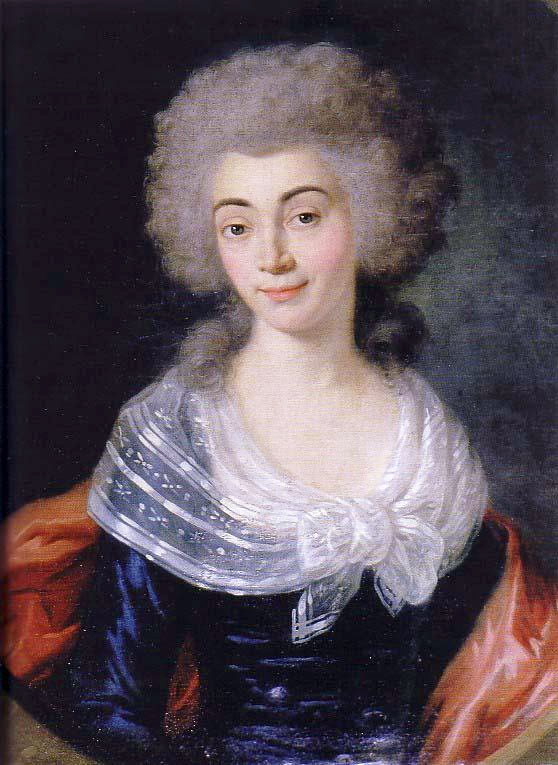
- Born: Marguerite Émilie Félecité Vernet; 20 July 1760; Bayonne, France
- Died: 24 July 1794 (aged 34); Paris
- Resting place: Cimetière de Verdelais
- Known for: Painting, printmaking, drawing
- Spouse: Jean Chalgrin (m. 1776)

Marguerite Émilie Félecité Chalgrin (7 July 1760 – 24 July 1794) was a French painter who was executed by guillotine in 1794.

== Life ==
Chalgrin is the daughter of French painter Claude-Joseph Vernet and Virginia Parker.

In 1776, she married the architect Jean-François Chalgrin, who won the Prix de Rome in 1758. Claude Joseph Vernet gave his daughter a dowry of 40,000 francs and gave his son-in-law the painting Les Cascatelles de Tivoli.

In 1777, Chalgrin gave birth to a daughter, Louise-Josèphe. However, her marriage was not harmonious, and in 1782 Jean-François Chalgrin abandoned his family.

From 1790, Chalgrin had a relationship with Baron Antoine Pierre Piscatory (1760–1852).

During the Revolution, Émilie took refuge with her friend Rosalie Filleul at the Hôtel de Travers, located rue Bois-Le-Vent, in Passy, near the Château de la Muette.

During the Terror, Rosalie committed the imprudence of entrusting a junk dealer with several pieces of furniture from the Château de la Muette, unaware that they bore the royal mark.

Marguerite was denounced to the General Security Committee and, caught red-handed at her second-hand dealer, was accused of complicity in theft and concealment of objects belonging to the Republic. A candle bearing the stamp was found in her house of Provence, worth 20 pounds.

She was accused of "burning the candles of the nation," found guilty, and sentenced to death by the Revolutionary Tribunal. She was guillotined in the Place du Trône-Renversé on 24 July 1794, three days before the wedding of her daughter Louise-Josèphe.
