= Eduardo Noriega (Mexican actor) =

Mexican actor (1916–2007)

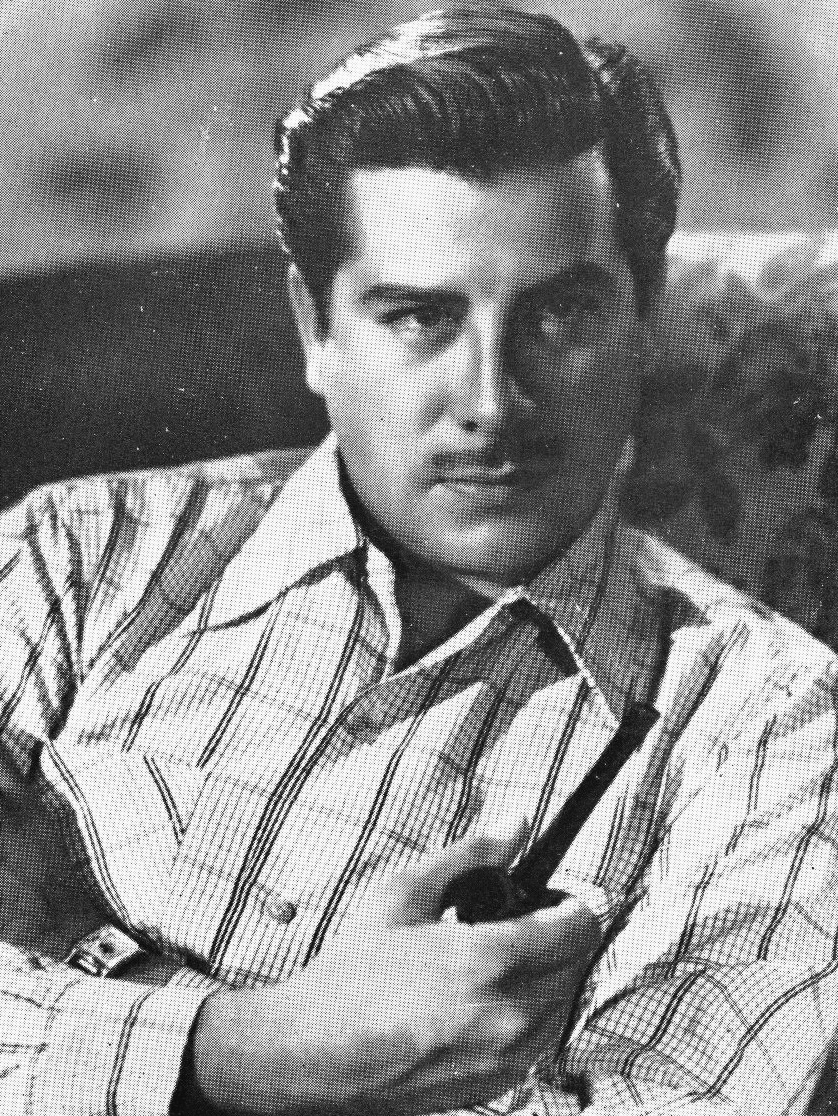
- Noriega in 1954
- Born: 25 September 1916; Mexico City, Distrito Federal, Mexico
- Died: 14 August 2007 (aged 90); Mexico City, Mexico
- Resting place: Iglesia de la Inmaculada, Mexico City, Mexico
- Occupation: Actor
- Years active: 1941–2005
- Spouses: Donnalee Mumaw (m. 1945, divorced): Name unknown (m. 19??)
- Children: 4

Eduardo Noriega (September 25, 1916 – August 14, 2007) was a Mexican film actor who appeared in over 100 films.

His best-known English-language role was as Don Francisco from San Jose in Zorro, The Gay Blade (1981). Other film roles included Cameahwait in The Far Horizons (1955), Señor Dominguez in Of Love and Desire (1963), and Inspector Talmadge in Tarzan and the Valley of Gold (1966).

Noriega also appeared in several television productions, such as La esposa virgen and Entre el amor y el odio.

== Family ==
He was married twice. He had four children with his first wife: Eduardo, Ricardo, Esteban and Laura. Ricardo followed in his father's footsteps and went into acting. His son, Esteban, preceded him in death.

== Selected filmography ==
- The League of Songs (1941)
- The Associate (1946) - Corredor de bolsa
- The Newlywed Wants a House (1948) - Quico Posada
- The Woman of the Port (1949)
- The Eagle and the Hawk (1950) - Roberto the Cobbler
- Immaculate (1950)
- Orange Blossom for Your Wedding (1950)
- The Shrew (1951)
- The Boy and the Fog (1953)
- The Magnificent Matador (1955)
- The Far Horizons (1955) - Cameahwait
- The Beast of Hollow Mountain (1956) - Enrique Rios
- Of Love and Desire (1963) - Señor Dominguez
- Tarzan and the Valley of Gold (1966) - Insp. Talmadge
- Guyana: Crime of the Century (1979)
- Zorro, the Gay Blade (1981) - Don Francisco
- Pier 5, Havana (1959) -Fernando Ricardo

=== Television ===
- Prisionera de amor (Prisoner of Love) (1994), telenovela
- La esposa virgen
- Entre el amor y el odioThe Texan TV series also. 1958 to 1959
