= Heredia (etymology) =

Heredia is a place-name and surname stemming from the singular Latin noun heredium (plural: heredia). However, different evolution paths have been postulated for the word, even different origins.

== Hereditary land ==
According to Belgian economist Émile Louis Victor de Laveleye, the heredium was "land transmitted hereditarily". The heredium symbolized "the continuity between one generation of citizens and the next".

In Apellidos vascos, linguist Koldo Mitxelena postulates a similar heredium root for the surname and village Heredia in the Basque Country, attested as Deredia for small place-names in Basque, due to prothesis, in the same way as Basque surname and place-name Gerediaga.

Other words related to heredia include:

- heredipeta: the next heir.
- hereditamentum: hereditament, all property that may be inherited.
- hereditare: to cause to inherit.
- hereditas: an inheritance.

== Unit of measurement ==
A heredium is also an Ancient Roman unit of measurement, approximately equivalent to 1.246 acres or 5060 square meters.

== Herod ==
On the other hand, Flavius Josephus believes that heredium was a name given to a costly citadel in memory of Herod's great actions, as Herod "adorned it with the most costly palaces, and erected very strong fortifications" (The Genuine Works of Flavius Josephus, page 48). Likewise, the History of Free Masonry claims that Heredia is a name derived from Herod the Great and his Herodian Kingdom.
