= Guy Sutton Bocquet =

Colonel G.S. Bocquet CIE

Lieutenant-Colonel Guy Sutton Bocquet CIE VD FRSA (14 May 1882 – 18 January 1961) was Deputy Director of Railways in Mesopotamia during World War I, a senior officer in the East Bengal Railway Company between 1925 and 1936, and in command of the East Bengal Railway Battalion Auxiliary Force in India between 1925 and 1932. He was aide-de-camp to the Viceroy of India between 1928 and 1932.

== Biography ==
Guy Sutton Bocquet was born on 14 May 1882, the third son of William Bocquet of Liverpool and his wife, Baroness Van Zuylen van Neveldt de Gaesbeck of Brussels. His brother was the composer, Roland Bocquet, and both boys were educated at Bedford Modern School.

Bocquet was apprenticed for two years with the London and North Western Railway before joining the Indian State Railways in 1901 as a Transport Officer. In 1912 he was recorded as being a Captain in the Eastern Bengal State Railway Volunteer Rifles having volunteered on 17 December 1907.

Bocquet served in World War I with the East Bengal Railway Battalion, was mentioned in despatches, attained the rank of Lieutenant-Colonel and was made Deputy Director of Railways in Mesopotamia. In recognition of his war service, he was made a Companion of the Order of the Indian Empire in 1918.

After World War I Bocquet became a senior officer in the Eastern Bengal Railway and attained the rank of colonel commanding the East Bengal Railway Battalion Auxiliary Force between 1925 and 1932. He served as ADC to the Viceroy of India between 1928 and 1932 and was awarded the King George V Silver Jubilee Medal in 1935. He retired from the Indian Railways in 1936.

In 1910 Bocquet married Gwynneth (née Macredie), an American citizen from Slayton, Minnesota. He was fond of golf, tennis, and the fine arts, a member of the Bengal Club and a Fellow of the Royal Society of Arts.

Bocquet died in Crowborough, England on 18 January 1961.
