= Jeannette Benavides =

Costa Rican nanotechnologist and physical chemist (born 1952)

- Born: 7 July 1952 (age 74); Heredia, Costa Rica
- Education: Liceo de Heredia High School; University of Costa Rica (BSc); American University (MSc, PhD)
- Scientific career
- Workplaces: Goddard Space Flight Center, NASA

Jeannette M. Benavides Gamboa (born 7 July 1952) is a Costa Rican nanotechnologist and physical chemist. She worked at NASA from 1986 until her retirement in 2006 and developed a new process in carbon nanotubes.

== Biography ==
Benavides was born on 7 July 1952 in Heredia, Costa Rica, and was educated at Braulio Morales School and Liceo de Heredia High School.

Benavides studied a BSc in Chemistry at the University of Costa Rica, graduating in 1975. She achieved a MSc in Biochemistry and a PhD in Physical Chemistry from the American University in Washington D. C.

Benavides worked at NASA from 1986 until her retirement in 2006. At NASA, she worked at the Goddard Space Flight Center on metal-through-metal diffusion in electrical gold-coated pins, which has been used in the Cassini Space Probe mission to Saturn. She was also named as the inventor for two patents of the development of a new process in carbon nanotubes and is credited with reducing the cost and creating a purer and safer product. She was honoured at the Nanotech Briefs Nano 50 Awards for her work.

Isaac Martín School in Costa Rica have named its Chemistry Laboratory after Benavides.

== Select publications ==
- Benavides, J. M., "Kinetics of Water Absorption Using a Karl Fisher Coulometric Instrument", NASA Parts and Advanced Interconnection Program, No. 3, 1996.
- Benavides, J. M., "Evaluation of a Procedure for the Measurement of Thin Film Thickness by X-ray Reflectivity", NASA Technical Paper #3697, September 1997.
- Benavides, J. M., "Synthesis of a Magnetic Polyvinylferrocene –Tetracyanoethylene Complex", American University, December 1998.
