= Ancienne Laiterie de Madame =

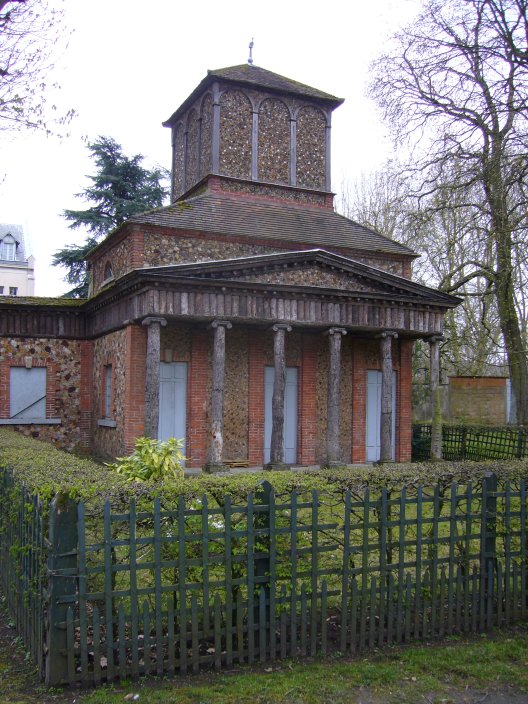
- Ancienne Laiterie de Madame
- Interactive map of the Ancienne Laiterie de Madame area

General information
- Location: 2 rue Vauban, Versailles,, France
- Coordinates: 48.798977°N 2.15496°E
- Completed: 1780

Design and construction
- Architect: Jean-François Chalgrin

The Ancienne Laiterie de Madame is a dairy built by Jean-François Chalgrin in 1780 for Marie Joséphine of Savoy, spouse of Louis, Comte de Provence located in Versailles.
