= Didier Bocquet =

French musician

Didier Bocquet is a French electronic music composer and musician who was active in the late 1970s and early 1980s. His primary instrument was the keyboard and he was inspired by German artist Klaus Schulze.

== Discography ==
- Eclipse (1977) LP
- Cerebral Voyage (1978) LP
- Sequences (1980) LP Pulse Records
- Pictures of Life (1982) LP Pulse Records
