= Basílica del Juramento de San Rafael =

Church building in Córdoba, Spain

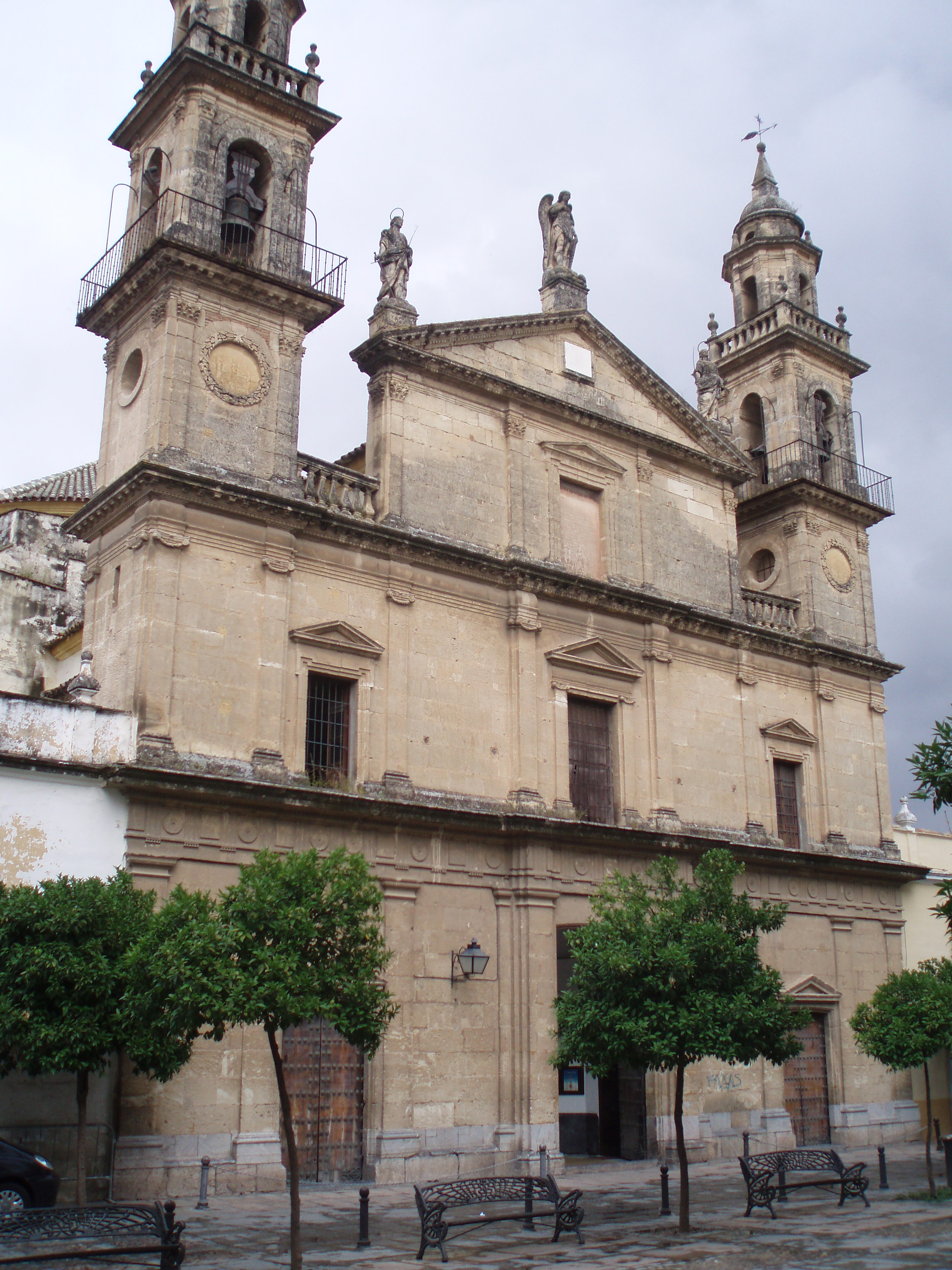
Juramento de San Rafael

Basílica del Juramento de San Rafael (Basilica of the Oath to Saint Rafael) is a minor basilica in Córdoba, Spain. It stands on the site where it is believed that the Raphael the Archangel appeared to Father Roeles in 1578, vowing to guard the city. Financing to build the church occurred the late 18th century, with construction completed in 1806. It is a Bien de Interés Cultural monument.

== Architecture and fittings ==
The structure combines a longitudinal space with a circular facade representing the latest neoclassical style of the city. The interior is divided by three naves with bent arches that are rest upon quadrangular pillars. The crossing is crowned with a barrel vault . On the main altar, a baldachin houses the titular image, which dates to 1735. There are also works of the painter and Cordoban biographer Antonio Cordoba Acisclus Palomino which date to the 18th century.
