= Ornamentalism (architecture) =

Ornamentalism is a post-modern architectural style that was a reaction against Modernism.
