= Heredia (district) =

District in Heredia canton, and city of Heredia province, Costa Rica

- District, City
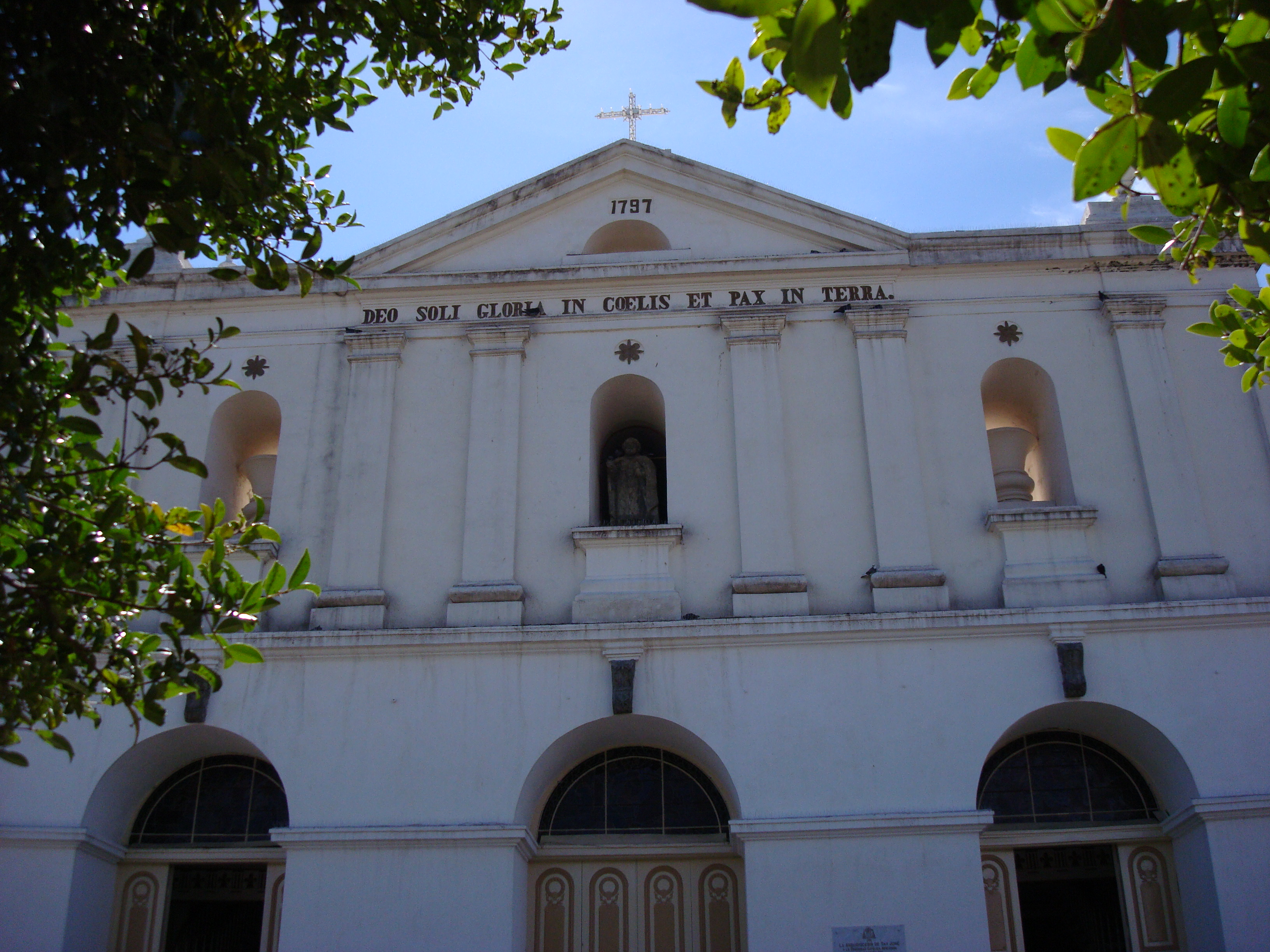
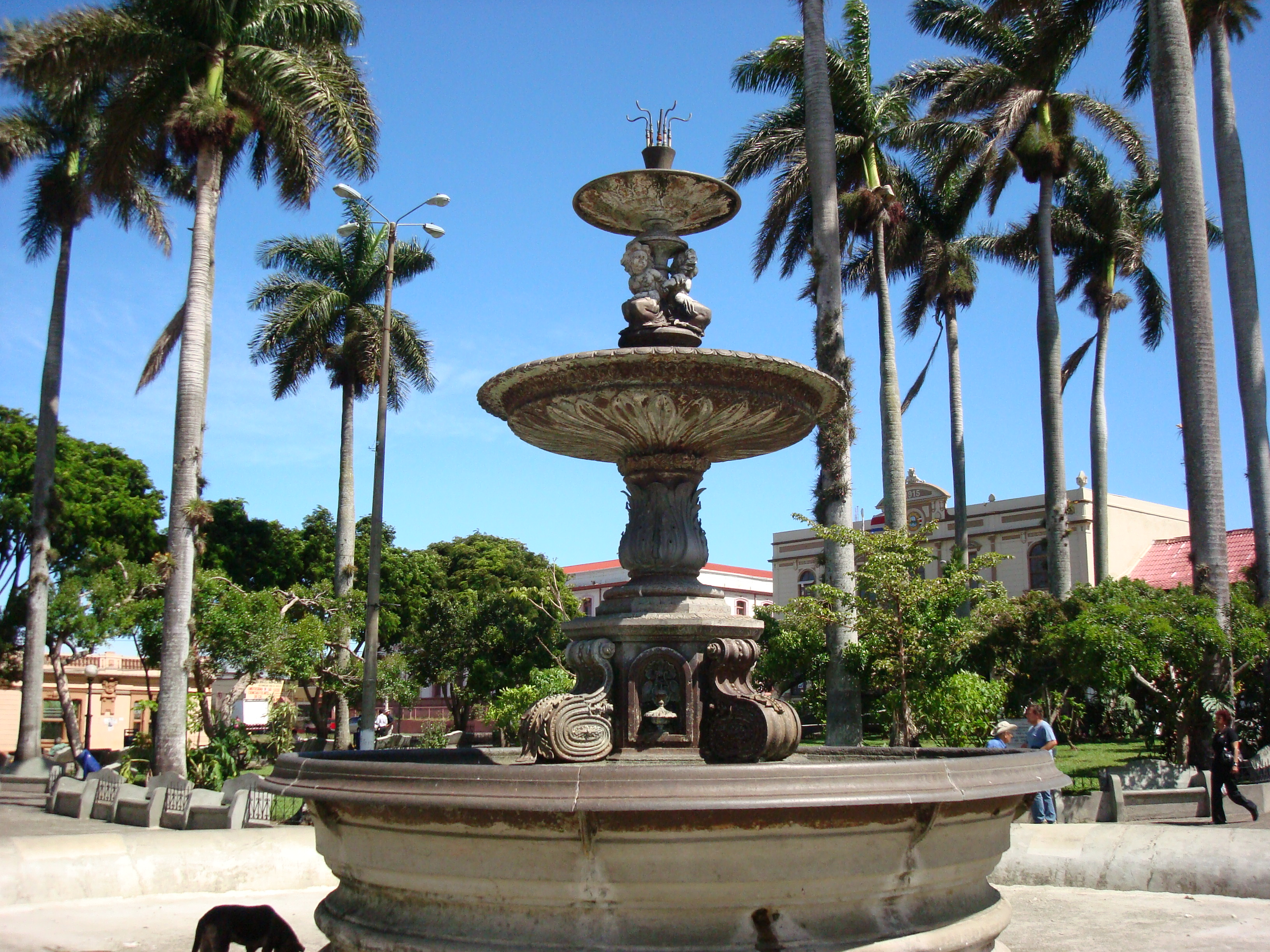
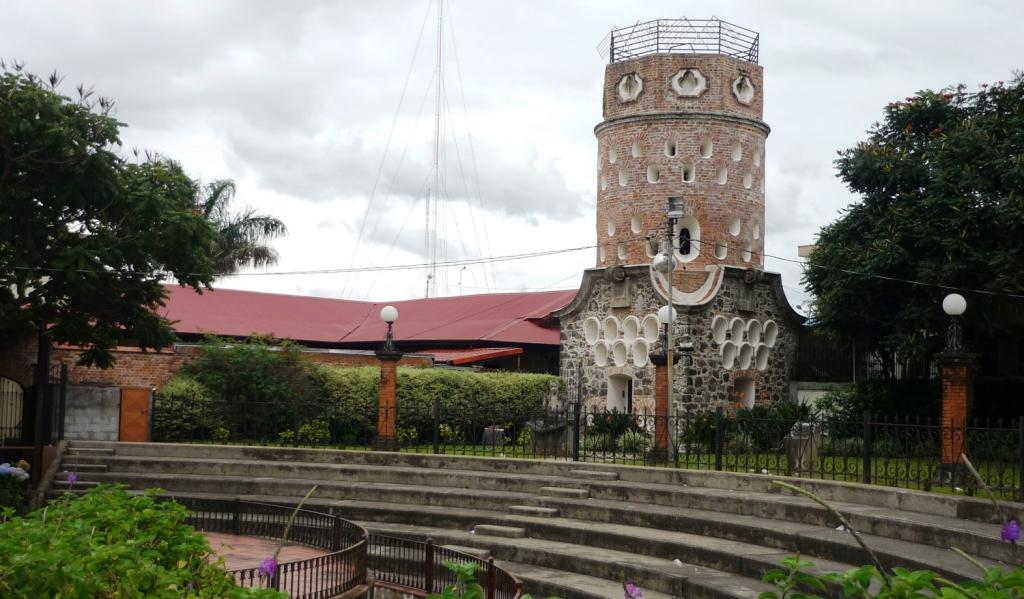
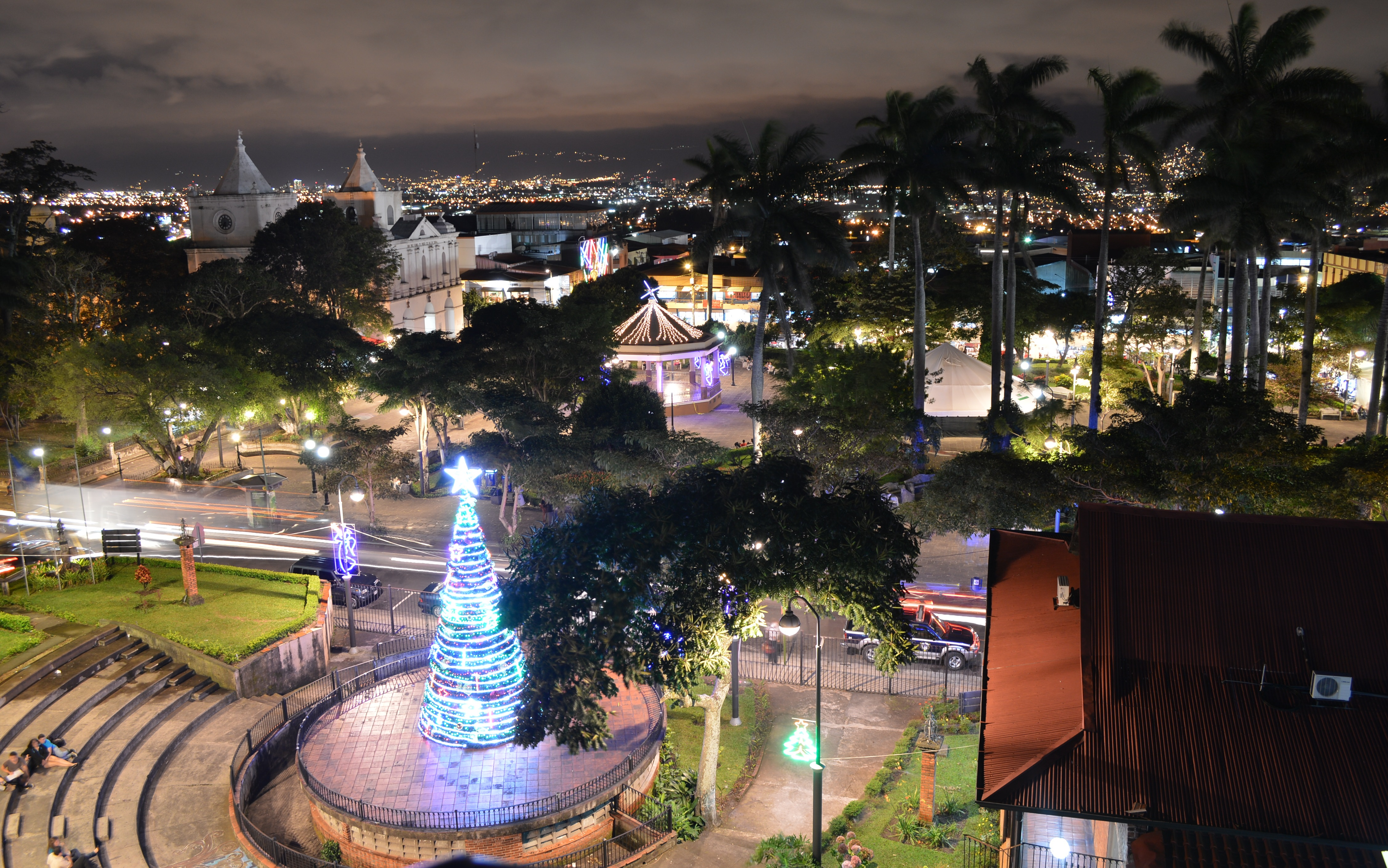
- Images, from top down, left to right: Church of the Immaculate Conception of Heredia, Central Park, the Fort and Amphitheatre of Heredia, Heredia skyline during the night.

- Flag Coat of arms
- Nickname: Ciudad de las Flores (Spanish) "City of Flowers"
- Motto(s): Libertad, Paz, y Progreso (Spanish) "Liberty, Peace and Progress"
- Interactive map of Heredia
- Location of Heredia within Costa Rica
- Coordinates: 9.9984632°N 84.1168617°W
- Country: Costa Rica
- Province: Heredia Province
- Canton: Heredia Canton
- Founded: 1705

Government
  - Syndic: Eduardo Murillo Quirós

Area
  - District, City: 2.95 km^{2} (1.14 sq mi)
- Elevation: 1,150 m (3,770 ft)

Population (2020)
  - District, City: 19,117
  - Estimate (2026): 133,143
  - Density: 6,480/km^{2} (16,800/sq mi)
  - Urban: 348,396
  - Metro: 364,000
- Urban, Metro are subregion of San Jose Urban and Metro Area
- Time zone: UTC−06:00
- Postal code: 40101
- Climate: Am
- Website: http://www.heredia.go.cr/

Heredia (Spanish pronunciation: [eˈɾeðja]) is a district in the Heredia canton of Heredia province, Costa Rica. As the seat of the municipality of Heredia canton, it is awarded the status of city, and by virtue of being the city of the first canton, it is the Province Capital of Heredia province as well. It is 10 kilometers to the north of the country's capital, San José.

The city is home to one of the largest colleges in Costa Rica, the National University of Costa Rica, which accepts many international students.

== History ==
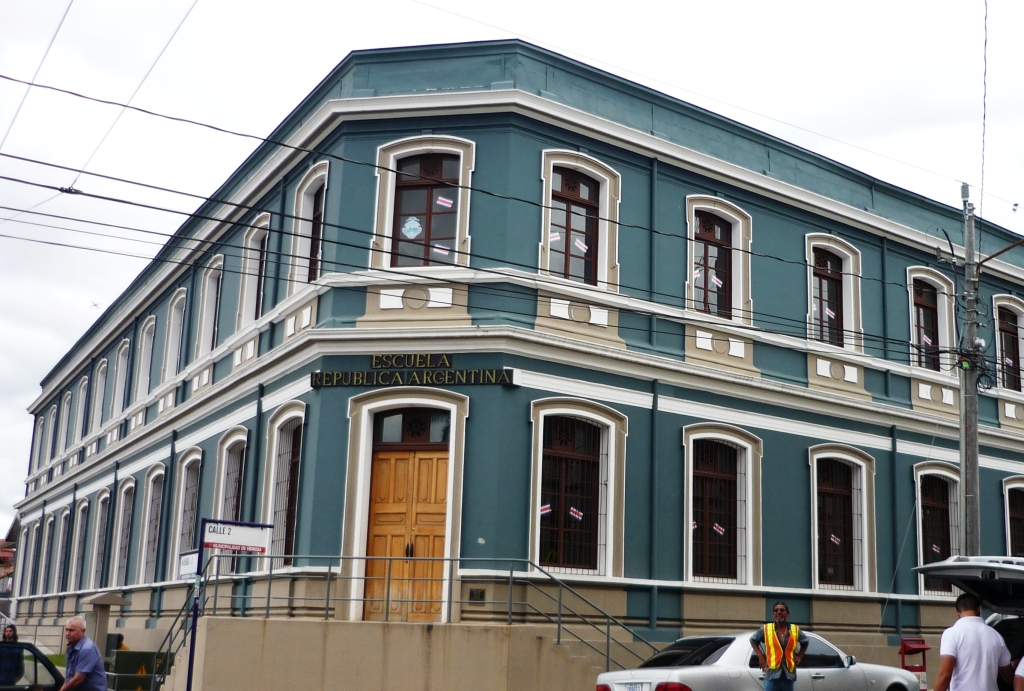
Cultural centre "Escuela República de Argentina"

Prior to its founding, the area around Heredia was inhabited by the native tribe that is known as the Huetares, who were commanded at the coming of the Spanish by the cacique Garabito. In 1706, settlers from Cartago set up a small church at a place they called "Alvirilla", which soon became more populated. Between 1716 and 1717 the settlers moved their village to the north, to a place the indigenous people called Cubujuquí. In 1736, Heredia was deemed sufficiently large to be granted its own parish, and the first incarnation of the Iglesia de la Inmaculada was built to serve as its parish church. In 1751, the Bishop of Nicaragua and Costa Rica, Monseñor Pedro Agustín Morel de Santa Cruz, supervised the founding of the first school in Heredia, which was run by the church. This school is now known as the Liceo de Heredia. The town was promoted to the status of Villa in 1763; it was later renamed Heredia in honor of the President of the Real Audiencia of Guatemala who had conferred the status, don Alonso Fernández de Heredia. (See also: Heredia (etymology)) During the 18th century the area around Heredia was developed, with the founding Barva and other towns. On 31 October 1796, Padre Felix de Alvarado laid the foundation stone for the rebuilding of the Iglesia de la Inmaculada. The Municipality of Heredia was founded on 19 May 1812, and in 1824, Heredia was promoted to city by Juan Mora Fernández. The 1848 constitution made Heredia the capital of Heredia Province, promoted it to cantón, and assigned it seven parishes.

== Geography ==
Heredia has an area of 2.95 km^{2} (1.14 sq mi) and an elevation of 1,150 metres.

=== Overview ===
Heredia is located 11 km north of San José and is part of the Greater Metropolitan Area.

== Demographics ==
Historical population
Census	Pop.	±% p.a.
1864	3,146	—
1883	4,234	+1.58%
1892	6,047	+4.04%
1927	7,631	+0.67%
1950	11,967	+1.98%
1963	19,249	+3.72%
1973	22,700	+1.66%
1984	21,440	−0.52%
2000	20,191	−0.37%
2011	18,697	−0.70%
2022	16,686	−1.03%
Source: Instituto Nacional de Estadística y Censos; Centro Centroamericano de Población

For the 2011 census, Heredia had a population of 18,697 inhabitants.

== Transport ==
=== Road transport ===
The district is served by the following road routes:

- National Route 3
- National Route 5
- National Route 112
- National Route 113
- National Route 126
- National Route 171

=== Rail transport ===
The Interurbano Line operated by Incofer goes through this district. The rebuilt and national heritage Heredia railway station is a staffed station in the south of the district.

== Sports ==
The city's football club is Herediano, who have won the league title 28 times. They play their home games at the Estadio Eladio Rosabal Cordero.

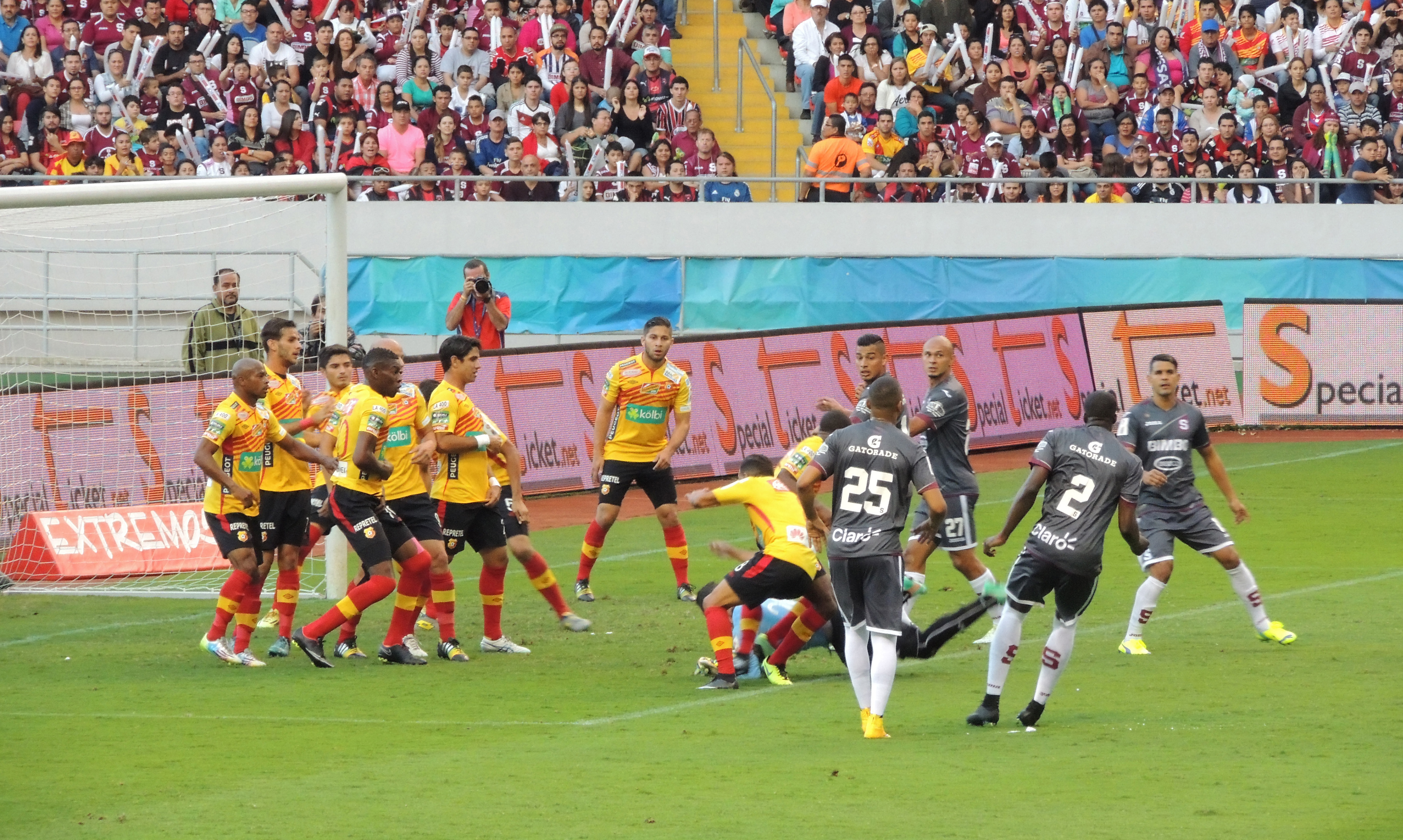
Heredianos play Saprissa, a rival.

== Sister cities ==
- (United States) Marietta (Georgia, USA)
- (United States) Richfield (Minnesota, USA)
- Ariel (Israeli occupied West Bank)

== Notable people ==
- Nathalia Alfaro, beach volleyball player who played in the Swatch FIVB World Tour 2005.
- Marvin Angulo, professional footballer who currently plays for Deportivo Saprissa.
- Óscar Arias, President of Costa Rica from 1986 to 1990 and from 2006 to 2010, and winner of the Nobel Peace Prize in 1987.
- Fernando Baudrit Solera, former Dean of the College of Law at the University of Costa Rica and public jurist.
- Jeannette Benavides, Costa Rican nanotechnologist and physical chemist
- Jewison Bennette, professional footballer who plays as a left winger for Herediano and the Costa Rica national team.
- Anthony Contreras, footballer who plays as a forward for AD Guanacasteca, on loan from Herediano.
- Alfredo González Flores, President of Costa Rica from 1914 to 1917. His home, the House of Culture-Alfredo Gonzales Flores, was declared a National Monument in November 1974.
- Zelmira Segreda Solera de Cappella, soprano singer.
- Manfred Ugalde, footballer for Twente on loan from Belgian First Division B club Lommel.
- Carlos Villegas, winger for club Deportivo Saprissa.
- Paulo Wanchope, former Costa Rica national football team player and manager.

== Climate ==
Heredia is very warm year-round, and the temperatures are tempered by the amount of cloud cover that affects the area. Rainfall is spread throughout the year, but the rainiest period is May to October. The climate is relatively mild throughout the year. In the Köppen climate classification, Heredia is in the tropical monsoon climate (Am) zone.

Climate data for Heredia
Month	Jan	Feb	Mar	Apr	May	Jun	Jul	Aug	Sep	Oct	Nov	Dec	Year
Mean daily maximum °C (°F)	24.3 (75.7)	25.1 (77.2)	26.4 (79.5)	26.7 (80.1)	25.8 (78.4)	25.1 (77.2)	24.8 (76.6)	24.8 (76.6)	24.9 (76.8)	24.7 (76.5)	24.4 (75.9)	24 (75)	25.1 (77.1)
Mean daily minimum °C (°F)	14.6 (58.3)	14.6 (58.3)	14.6 (58.3)	15 (59)	15.7 (60.3)	15.5 (59.9)	15.7 (60.3)	15.4 (59.7)	15 (59)	15.1 (59.2)	15.5 (59.9)	15.4 (59.7)	15.2 (59.3)
Average rainfall mm (inches)	20.4 (0.80)	21.7 (0.85)	47.8 (1.88)	110.1 (4.33)	333.1 (13.11)	327.8 (12.91)	199.5 (7.85)	241.6 (9.51)	410.8 (16.17)	424.6 (16.72)	182.4 (7.18)	54.5 (2.15)	2,374.3 (93.46)
Source: National Meteorologic Institute of Costa Rica

== See also ==
- Iglesia de la Inmaculada
