= Heredia (surname) =

Heredia is a surname originating in a place-name. One such surname is Basque, derived from the village Heredia in Álava, Basque Country.

The following people have the surname:

- Agustín Heredia (born 1997), Argentine footballer
- Alberto Heredia (1924–2000), Argentine painter and sculptor
- Alberto Heredia Ceballos (born 1987), Spanish soccer player
- Alejandro Heredia (1788–1838), Argentine statesman
- Alejandro Heredia Miranda (1929–2024), Peruvian football manager
- Alonso Fernández de Heredia (died 1782), Spanish general and politician
- Ángel Guillermo Heredia Hernández (born 1975), Mexican sports coach and former discus thrower
- Arnold Heredia (born 1940), Pakistani Catholic priest and human rights activist
- Carlos María de Heredia, Mexican critical thinker, author of Spiritism and Common Sense (1922), and friend of magician Harry Houdini
- Cayetano Heredia (1797–1861), Peruvian physician
- Daniel Heredia Abidal (born 1993), Spanish singer
- Enrique Fernández Heredia (fl. 1900s), Spanish military commander
- Fernando Martínez Heredia (1939–2017), Cuban politician
- Gil Heredia (born 1965), American baseball player
- Gonzalo Heredia (born 1982), Argentine actor
- Gonzalo Heredia (sailor) (born 1962), Argentine sailor
- Guillermo Heredia (baseball) (born 1991), Cuban baseball player
- Isabel de Herédia, Portuguese businesswoman, wife of Duarte Pio, Duke of Braganza
- José-Maria de Heredia (1842–1905), French poet
- José María Heredia y Heredia (1803–1839), Cuban poet and political activist
- Juan Carlos Heredia (born 1952), Argentine–Spanish retired footballer
- Juan Fernández de Heredia (c. 1310–1396), Aragonese historian
- Leonardo Heredia (born 1996), Argentine footballer
- Manual Heredia, 1832, a Spanish pioneer and businessman, Heredia company constructed the first charcoal-fired blast furnace for non-military purposes in Spain.
- Pablo Heredia (born 1990), Argentine footballer
- Pedro de Heredia (died 1554), Spanish conquistador
- Ramón Heredia (born 1951), Argentine retired footballer
- Sebastiano Aguilera de Heredia (1561–1627), Spanish composer and monk
- Ubaldo Heredia (born 1956), Venezuelan baseball player
- Víctor Heredia (born 1947), Argentine musician
