= Jacques-Melchior Villefranche =

French writer (1829–1904)

Jacques-Melchior Villefranche (b. at Couzon-sur-Saône, 17 December 1829; d. at Bourg, 10 May 1904) was a French editor, writer, and publicist working for Roman Catholic causes.

== Life ==
After classical studies at the lesser seminary of Largentière, he entered the telegraphic service. In that capacity in 1855, during the Crimean War, he directed the telegraphic bureau of Varna, the first landing-place of the Franco-Russian troops.

In 1870 as telegraphic director at Versailles he was attached to the service of telegraphic communications of the army of Le Mans. In 1875, he left the telegraphic service, and assumed the editorship of the Journal de l'Ain, in which he defended the cause of religious liberty, and campaigned against the laws of scholastic secularization.

== Works ==
He was prolific. His "Fables" (1851) and his Fabuliste Chrétien (1875) were pedagogical works. A number of historical and judicial romances included Cineas, ou Rome sous Néron (1869), which was translated into several foreign languages.

His major works are historical:

- Pius IX, son histoire, sa vie, son siècle (1874), reprinted nineteen times;
- Vie de Dom Marie-Augustin, Marquis de Ladouze, fondateur de la Trappe de Notre Dame des Dombes (1876);
- Vie de l'abbé Olivieri, fondateur de l'oeuvre du rachat des jeunes negresses (1877);
- Histoire des Martyrs de Gorcum, du Japon et autres canonisés par Pie IX (1882);
- Vie de Dom Bosco (1887);
- Vie du Père Chevrier, fondateur du Prado à Lyon (1894);
- Histoire de Napoleon III (2 vols., 1896).

In the controversial pamphlet published in 1891 and entitled Le Concordat, qu'on l'observe loyalement ou qu'on le dénonce, Villefranche argued against the policy of strict application of the Concordat, limiting the Catholic Church's rights on the basis that matters were not explicitly contained in the concordatory text.
