= Laurent Bocquet =

Laurent Bocquet was a French dancer, choreographer and ballet master of the 18th century.

== Career ==
Bocquet was a dancer in Turin in 1762. He became ballet master at The Royal Theatre of La Monnaie of Brussels from 1772 to 1777. He replaced Antoine Pitrot in the course of the season and, on January 27, 1772, he gave his first ballet: Le Triomphe de l'Amour et des Grâces. He also danced in Le Port de Londres (8 September 1773) and Les Hussards (20 October 1773).

During the season 1776–1777, he gave another eight ballets and shared his job with Auguste Fisse.

The contract concluded on February 17, 1772 with the directors of the theatre Ignaz Vitzthumb and Louis Compain specified that Bocquet was engaged as ballet master, as well as "to educate and train those we destine to figure and to sing in the opera the roles which will be judged to suit him, and in the comedy of accessories."

== Bibliography ==
=== References ===
- Isnardon, Jacques (1860–1930) (1890). "Bocquet": Le Théâtre de la Monnaie Depuis Sa Fondation Jusqu' à Nos Jours [The Théâtre de la Monnaie From Its Foundation to the Present Day] (in French). Preface by Arthur Pougin (1834–1921). Brussels: Schott frères. pp. 54, 59, 78, 101. Retrieved July 31, 2024. LCCN 10-8234; OCLC 1075479070, 1143202841, 315471410, 1075452354, 1177228233, 763260232, OCLC 665070 (all editions).
1. Via Internet Archive (BYU).
2. Via Google Books (NYPL).
- Van Aelbrouck, Jean-Philippe (born 1953) [in French] (1994). "Bocquet, Laurent": Dictionnaire des Danseurs: Chorégraphes et Maîtres de Danse à Bruxelles de 1600 à 1830 [Dictionary of Dancers: Choreographers and Dance Masters in Brussels from 1600 to 1830] (in French). Editions Mardaga (Music Council of the French Community of Belgium - CdM). pp. 80–81. LCCN 94-206443; ISBN 2-8700-9576-7, 978-2-8700-9576-8; OCLC 31610067 (all editions).
1. Via Google Books (limited preview).
