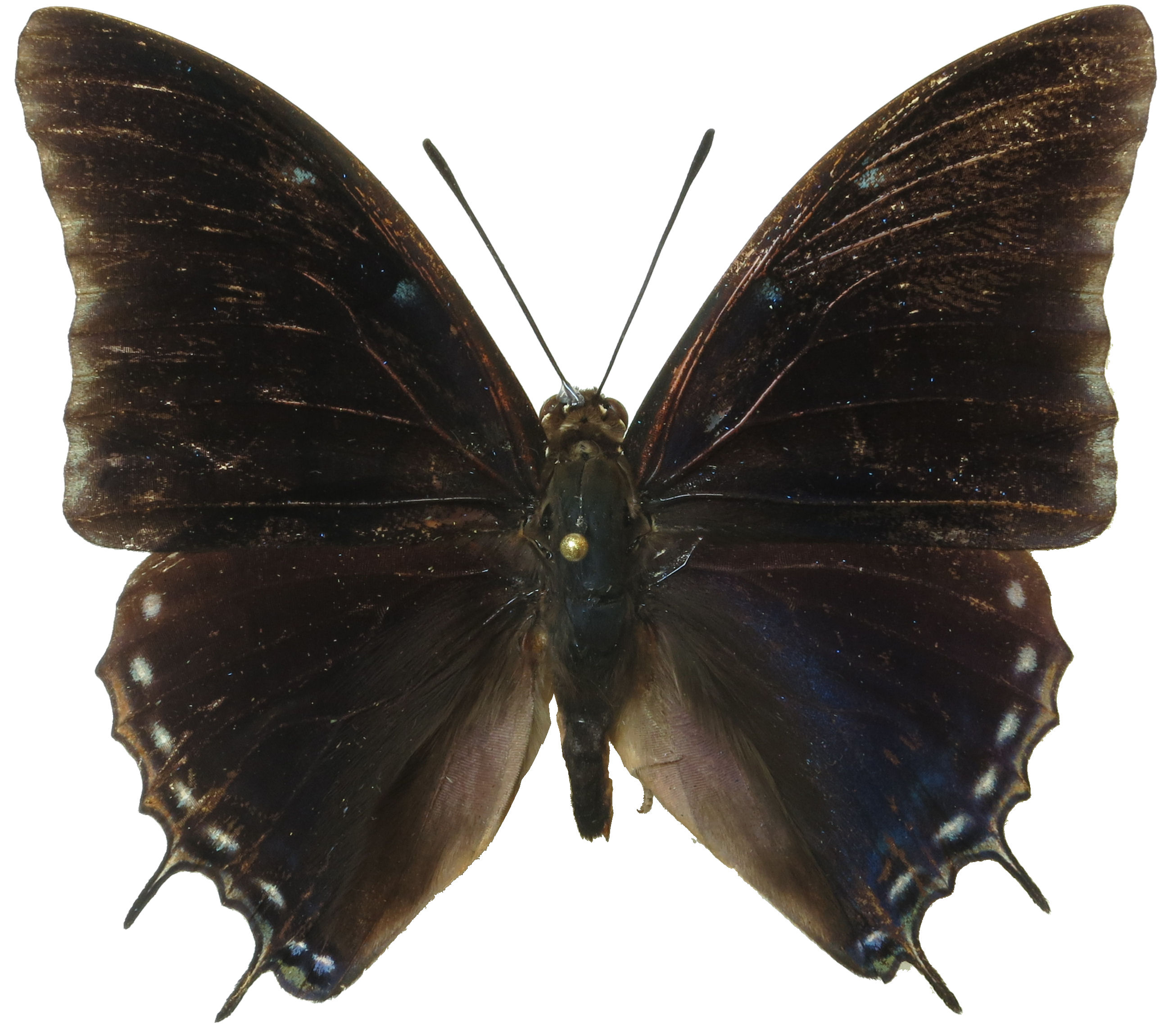
- Male C. b. oubanguiensis from the CAR

Conservation status
- Least Concern (IUCN 3.1)

Scientific classification
- Kingdom: Animalia
- Phylum: Arthropoda
- Clade: Pancrustacea
- Class: Insecta
- Order: Lepidoptera
- Family: Nymphalidae
- Genus: Charaxes
- Species: C. bocqueti

Binomial name
- Charaxes bocqueti Minig, 1975

Synonyms
- Charaxes bocqueti f. alladinoides Bouche and Minig, 1977

= Charaxes bocqueti =

Species of butterfly

Charaxes bocqueti, the Bocquet's demon charaxes, is a butterfly in the family Nymphalidae. It is found in Guinea, Sierra Leone, Ivory Coast, Ghana, Gabon, the Central African Republic and possibly Nigeria. The habitat consists of tropical evergreen forests.

== Subspecies ==
- C. b. bocqueti (Guinea, Sierra Leone, Ivory Coast, Ghana)
- C. b. oubanguiensis Mining, 1975 (Gabon, Central African Republic, possibly Nigeria)
