= Society of Archaeology, Sciences, Letters and Arts of the Seine-et-Marne Department =

Learned society for French historians and archaeologists

Society of Archaeology, Sciences, Letters and Arts of Seine-et-Marne
- Formation: 16 May 1864
- Founder: Louis Adolphe le Doulcet, Count of Pontécoulant
- Founded at: Melun
- Type: Learned society
- Purpose: Archaeology; History
- Headquarters: Melun
- Location: France
- Region served: Seine-et-Marne
- Official language: French

The Society of Archaeology, Sciences, Letters and Arts of the Seine-et-Marne Department (French: Société d'archéologie, sciences, lettres et arts du département de Seine-et-Marne) was a learned society for French historians and archaeologists in Seine-et-Marne during the 1860s.

== History ==
In the 1860s, Seine-et-Marne was the sole department in France lacking a learned society focused on sciences, letters, and arts. The society was proposed to bring together scholars of Seine-et-Marne, encouraging research in history and archaeology while organizing prizes, scientific trips, excavations, and regular publications.

=== Organization ===
In Melun, the Society of Archaeology, Sciences, Letters and Arts of Seine-et-Marne, was established on 16 May 1864. At this initial meeting, the founders adopted the society's name, determined membership regulations, and assigned the Organization Commission. A provisional office was set up with Louis Adolphe le Doulcet, Count of Pontécoulant as the Provisional President of the Society of Archaeology, Sciences, Letters and Arts of the Seine-et-Marne Department, assisted by G. Leroy as secretary.

With over 260 founding members, the society was made up of five sections based on the following districts of Seine-et-Marne:

- Melun
- Meaux
- Fontainebleau
- Coulommiers
- Provins

Membership reached 191 during a general meeting in Melun on 17 July 1864. The constitution of the Melun district section took place on 7 August 1864, with Pontécoulant appointing Eugène Grézy as president, M.H. Fréeau de Pény as vice president, M. G. Leroy as secretary, and Th. Lhuillier as assistant secretary. On 26 August 1864, the Meaux section of the Archaeology, Sciences, Letters, and Arts Society of Seine-et-Marne was established, with its installation at the Meaux Town Hall on 3 December 1864. By 4 September 1864, the society had 205 members: Melun 68, Fontainebleau 68, Meaux 34, Coulommiers 20, and Provins 15. On 10 October 1864, the mayor of Meaux authorized meetings at the Town Hall, and by 23 October, the founding membership had reached 263, including many leading scientific and administrative figures.

=== Central Committee ===
The public session for electing the society's Central Office occurred on 23 October 1864 in the grand salon of the Melun Town Hall, accompanied by music from the Mounted Chasseurs of the Imperial Guard. The general consensus was overseen by M. Carro, president of the Meaux section; Félix Bourquelot, delegate of the Provins section; Jules David, president of the Fontainebleau section; Anatole Dauvergne, president of the Coulommiers section; Eugène Grézy, president of the Melun section; and Lhuillier, assistant secretary of the Melun section. Anatole Dauvergne was elected President of the Central Committee, alongside Vice President Eugène Preschez, Delegate Ad Bayard, Secretary Mr. Adam, and Deputy Secretary Fernand Ogier de Baulny.

The section of Provins was constituted on 3 December 1864 at the Provins town hall. By 1865, the number of members totaled 294: Coulommiers 44, Meaux 48, Melun 82, Fontainebleau 81, and Provins 39.

In Meaux on 21 May 1866, the Archaeology, Sciences, Letters, and Arts Society of Seine-et-Marne held its inaugural public session of the year. The session opened at the Hôtel de Ville with a performance of a piece by Daniel Auber, played by the Lancers of the Guard regiment under Mr. Hippolyte Martin's direction. Reelected as president, Marquis Pontécoulant headed the Central Bureau for May 1866 to May 1867, alongside Vice-president M.A. Carro, Secretary-General Th. Lhuillier, Treasurer Mr. Courtois, and Archivist Mr. Lemaire.

Excavations in the wells of Châteaubleau were attended by several society members in September 1866.

On 2 August 1866, a committee was formed within the society to take part in the organization of the Exposition de'Historie du Travail (Exhibition on the History of Labor) at the 1867 Paris Exposition.

The society was dissolved in 1982.

== Publications ==
In the mid-to-late 1860s, the society began publishing the Bulletin de la Société d'archéologie, sciences, lettres et arts du département de Seine-et-Marne. By 1867–68, the society's bulletin was in its fourth year of publication.

In 1866, a historical and archaeological directory of Seine-et-Marne titled Dictionnaire archéologique de Seine-et-Marne (Archaeological Dictionary of Seine-et-Marne) was planned by the society, with questionnaires distributed to various individuals and teachers to gather detailed information on each commune.

== Noted members ==
- Louis Adolphe le Doulcet, Count of Pontécoulant, Provisional President
- Louis Leguay, French architect
- Auguste Edmond Petit de Beauverger
- Félix Bourquelot
