= Iglesia de la Inmaculada =

Iglesia de la Inmaculada Concepción Church of the Immaculate Conception
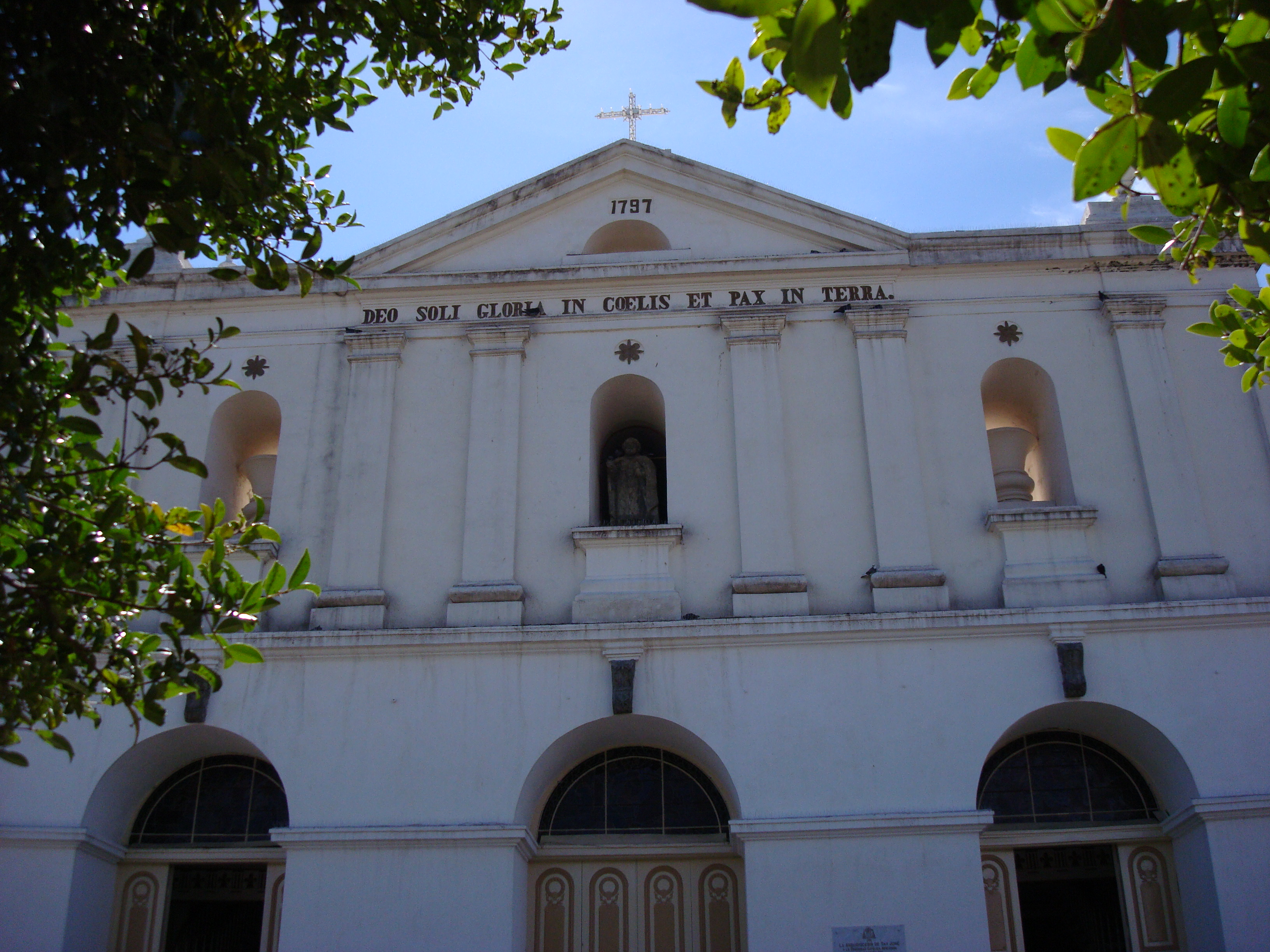

Religion
- Affiliation: Roman Catholic
- Ecclesiastical or organisational status: Parish church
- Year consecrated: 1704

Location
- Location: Costa Rica
- Interactive map of Iglesia de la Inmaculada Concepción; Church of the Immaculate Conception
- Coordinates: 9°59′54″N 84°6′58″W

Architecture
- Style: Neoclassical and Baroque
- Groundbreaking: 1797
- Completed: c. 1806
- Capacity: 60,000 +

The Iglesia de la Inmaculada Concepción, commonly known as La Inmaculada, is a church located in Heredia, Costa Rica.

== Overview ==
The first church in Heredia was a small wooden construct built as early as 1704 in an attempt to convert the natives; nothing remains of the original building, which was replaced by a larger, more permanent adobe structure in July 1736 when Heredia was granted its own independent parish. Construction on the current building began towards the end of the colonial period. The cornerstone was laid on October 31, 1797, but the church was not completed until several years later; though the exact date is unknown, it is believed to have been completed in 1806. The façade was again reconstructed in 1851 when an earthquake brought it tumbling to the ground. Over the years, a baptistry and catechism school were added, while the church gardens were enlarged. The temple exhibits a simple, whitewashed, Spanish neoclassical exterior, while the relatively unadorned interior shows the humility and faith of the people who constructed it. On the front of the church, three niches once contained statues of saints created by the famous Heredian soldier, architect, and sculptor Fadrique Gutiérrez; today, only the central statue of St. Peter remains. The 20 stained glass windows which adorn the church were made in France.

Monseñor Gregorio de Jesús Benavides is buried in the church gardens.
