= Rosalie Filleul =

French artist (1752–1794)

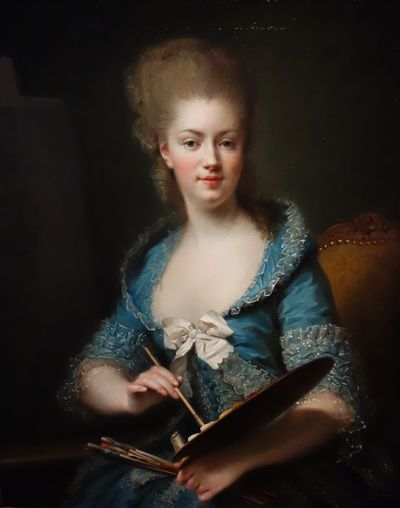
- Self-portrait by Rosalie Filleul, circa 1775
- Born: Anne Rosalie Bocquet Filleul; 1752; Paris, France
- Died: June 24, 1794; Paris, France
- Known for: Painting
- Spouse: Louis Besne Filleul (m. 1777; died 1788)

Rosalie Filleul (1752 – June 24, 1794) was a French pastellist and painter. She was born in Paris, and was concierge of the Château de la Muette. Although she initially supported the French Revolution, she nevertheless became disillusioned by its excesses and mourned the execution of Louis XVI. Somewhat indiscreetly, at the height of the Terror, she made arrangements to sell some of the furniture at the Château de la Muette to a secondhand dealer. This was reported to the authorities and she was arrested on charges of theft and concealment of biens nationaux – property belonging to the Republic. Rosalie Filleul was found guilty and guillotined in 1794, along with her friend Mme Chalgrin, despite the attempted intervention of Chalgrin's brother Carle Vernet.

Her cousin was the pastellist Jeanne-Angélique Boquet.

== Early life and education ==
Anne-Rosalie Bouquet was born in Paris in 1752. Her father, Blaise Bouquet, was the owner of a bric-à-brac shop and an ornament painter. While she was young she had an interest in art. Most of the accounts we have of Filleul are from her best friend Élisabeth Louise Vigée Le Brun. Filleul and Le Brun were very close and spent a lot of time together. Growing up, Rosalie was influenced by the wide variety of art and other objects in her father's shop and by his painting skills. Ever since a young age, she had the natural ability to paint. In her youth, she learned to paint from her father. In addition to her natural ability to paint, the other knowledge she gained was by looking at etchings and busts that a neighboring artist Gabriel Briard lent her and her cousin Élisabeth Louise Vigée Le Brun. Briard was known mostly for his landscape and portrait painting. Accounts by Vigèe Le Brun depict Briard, as a mediocre painter but as a very talented sketch artist. Filleul's natural talent and art lessons from Briard helped her excel in her craft and become well versed in pastels. At the age of seventeen, Filleul was exhibited at the Salon, a great achievement for such a young age.

== Personal and professional life ==
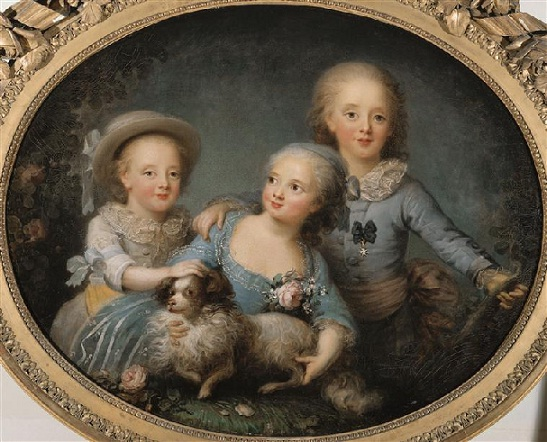
Rosalie Filleul, The children of the comte d'Artois, 1781. Palace of Versailles, France. Of a number of royal portraits that Filleul painted at Marie Antoinette's invitation, this is the only one that has survived.

Rosalie Filleul married Louis Besne Filleul in 1777, at the age of twenty-four. Besne was the Superintendent of the royal Chateau of Muette. He was much older than Rosalie in age. The couple made their home in the Hotel De Travers near Muette. Rosalie also attracted the attention of the royal family especially Marie Antoinette, who really liked Muette. The royal family gave her several commissions for various portraits.

Rosalie had a son named Louis-August. Rosalie became a widow in 1788, after ten years of marriage with Louis but was allowed to remain in her own home because her late husband's office was passed onto her by the Queen. She lived there with her son, who was eight years old at the time and her close friend Marguerite-Émilie Chalgrin, who was the daughter of the artist Claude-Joseph Vernet.

Madame de Bonneuil, who was reputedly the most beautiful woman in Paris and later became a spy in the French Revolution was a good friend of Rosalie. Benjamin Franklin also often modelled for her and appeared to have had a crush on her.

Rosalie was also close friends with Madame Vigee Le Brun. Although they both had different styles with painting, they spent a lot of time with each other and even worked on paintings together. Lebrun also wrote memoirs after Filleul's death describing how she missed her friend and recollected their talks before she was guillotined in the French Revolution. Lebrun considered Filleul as a considerable rival and acknowledged her talent as an artist.

== Works and style ==
Rosalie was famous for her beauty and brushstrokes. In 1780, she was hired to paint views of the estate, with an emphasis on its lush English-style gardens. Of these royal portraits, only a few survived the revolution. One of them was her most popular painting, titled “The children of the comte d'Artois.” Among her paintings that did survive to present day, few are quite as charming as her pastel paintings of the Château de Chantilly gardens. Her paintings capture the simple, rustic yet beautiful English-style gardens that came into vogue among the French upper elite in the 1770s and 1780s.

Filleul's works often revolved around the theme of children. She painted children sometimes playing around in a group and other times she painted them in a single portrait. She also painted one of the founding fathers of the United States, writer, politician, inventor etc. Benjamin Franklin. The portrait of Benjamin Franklin became one of her most liked and respected works.

== Death ==
When the French Revolution broke out in 1789, Rosalie Filleul welcomed the change thinking it would bring more freedom to the country. Rosalie did not emigrate during the Revolution. She soon became disillusioned by the changes of the newfound freedom—particularly the suppression of Christianity and the imprisonment of the royal family. At the time of the revolution, showing any kind of sympathy toward the royal family was an offense punishable by death. On the first anniversary of King Louis XVI's execution, Rosalie Filleul wore mourning attire, as she had always maintained a relationship with the royal family. This would be the first instance to draw negative attention to Rosalie.

In 1794, Mme. Chalgrin (daughter of the painter Vernet and wife of the architect of La Muette) held a wedding reception for her daughter at La Muette. Mme. Chalgrin and Rosalie Filleul were caught and charged with trying to sell pieces of furniture which bore the royal insignia from Muette. These two instances attracted negative attention from the Committee of Public Safety and Rosalie was denounced and put under surveillance. Eventually, Mme. Chalgrin and Rosalie Filleul were both arrested and were found guilty of their charges.

On June 24, 1794 Rosalie Filleul, Mme. Chalgrin and Rosalie Filleul's mother were guillotined at the Place du Trône-Renversé. It is believed that the painter Jacques-Louis David (a rejected suitor of Mme. Chalgrin) may have played a role in the fate of the women.

Rosalie Filleul is remembered in the memoirs of Madame Élisabeth Louise Vigée Le Brun:

"She had a remarkable talent for painting, but she gave up the pursuit almost immediately after her marriage with M. Filleul, when the Queen made her Gatekeeper of the Castle of La Muette. Would that I could speak of the dear creature without calling her dreadful end to mind. Alas! how well I remember Mme. Filleul saying to me, on the eve of my departure from France, when I was to escape from the horrors I foresaw: 'You are wrong to go. I intend to stay, because I believe in the happiness the Revolution is to bring us.' And that Revolution took her to the scaffold! Before she quitted La Muette the Terror had begun. Mme. Chalgrin, a daughter of Joseph Vernet, and Mme. Filleul's bosom friend, came to the castle to celebrate her daughter's wedding – quietly, as a matter of course. However, the next day the Jacobins nonetheless proceeded to arrest Mme. Filleul and Mme. Chalgrin, who, they said, had wasted the candles of the nation. A few days later they were both guillotined."
