= Jeanne-Angélique Boquet =

French artist

Jeanne-Angélique Boquet (1731 – 4 February 1804 Paris), sometimes Bocquet, was a French pastellist who was active around 1774.

Boquet was the daughter of Louis-René Boquet (1717–1814), a costume designer for the Paris Opéra who also served as an inspector for the Menus plaisirs. She worked at the latter place as well, copying portraits. Her husband was Jean Charny, vernisseur de Monsieur. Boquet was related to a number of artists, and was cousin to the pastellist Rosalie Filleul.
