= Jean-François Chalgrin =

French architect (1739–1811)

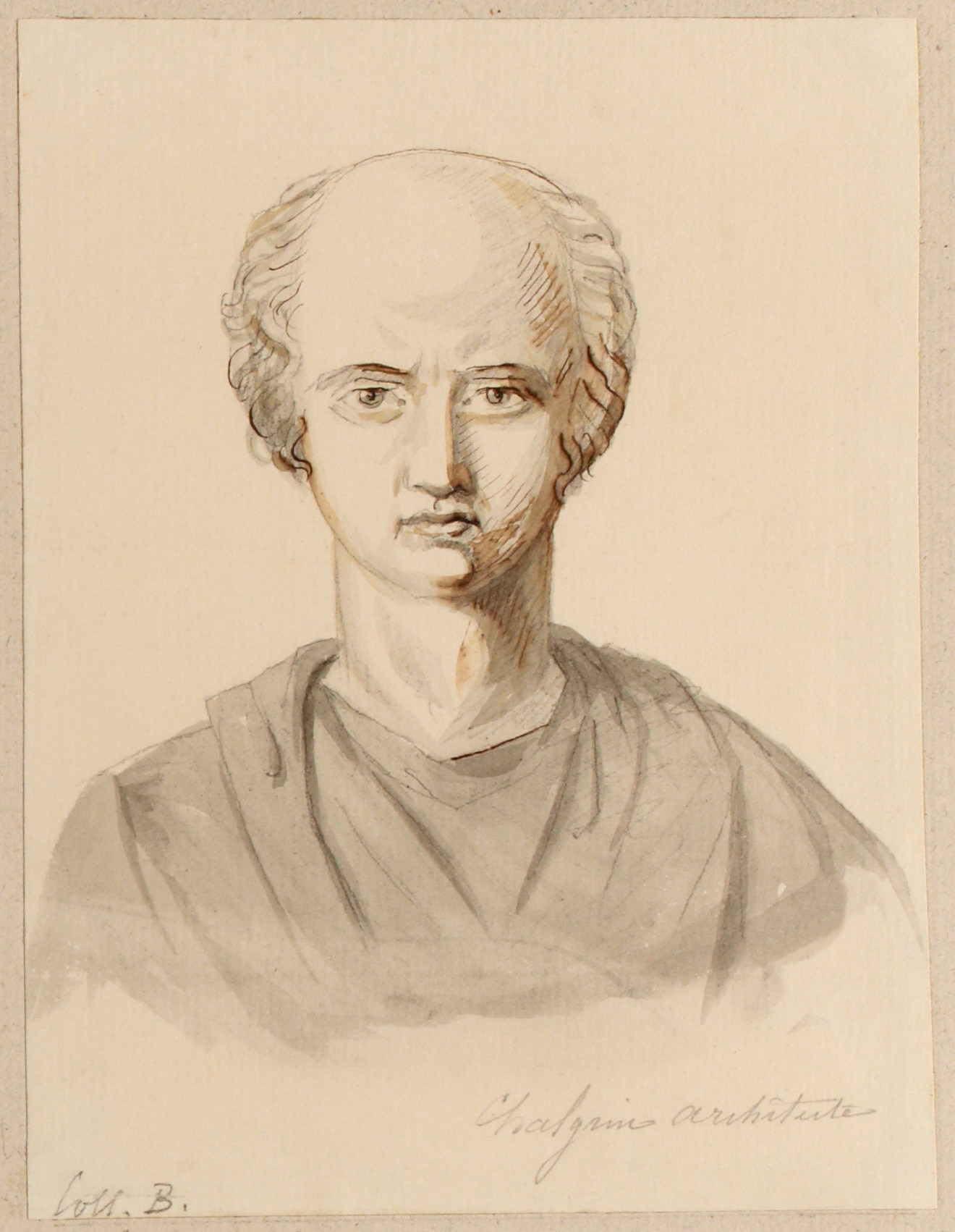
- Jean-François Chalgrin, 1786
- Born: 1739; Paris, France
- Died: 21 January 1811 (aged 71–72); Paris, France
- Occupation: Architect
- Spouse: Émilie Vernet
- Awards: Prix de Rome
- Practice: Neoclassicism
- Buildings: Arc de Triomphe

Jean-François Chalgrin (French pronunciation: [ʒɑ̃ fʁɑ̃swa ʃalɡʁɛ̃]; 1739 – 21 January 1811) was a French architect, best known for his design for the Arc de Triomphe, Paris.

== Biography ==
His neoclassic orientation was established from his early studies with the prophet of neoclassicism Giovanni Niccolò Servandoni and with the radical classicist Étienne-Louis Boullée in Paris and through his Prix de Rome sojourn (November 1759 – May 1763) as a pensionnaire of the French Academy in Rome. His time in Rome coincided with a fervent new interest in Classicism among the young French pensionnaires, under the influences of Piranesi and the publications of Winckelmann.

Returning to Paris, he was quickly given an appointment as an inspector of public works for the city of Paris, under the architect Pierre-Louis Moreau-Desproux, whose own time at the French Academy in Rome had predisposed him to the new style. In this official capacity he oversaw the construction of Ange-Jacques Gabriel's Hôtel Saint-Florentin in the rue Saint-Florentin, where Chalgrin was able to design the neoclassical gateway to the cour d'honneur.

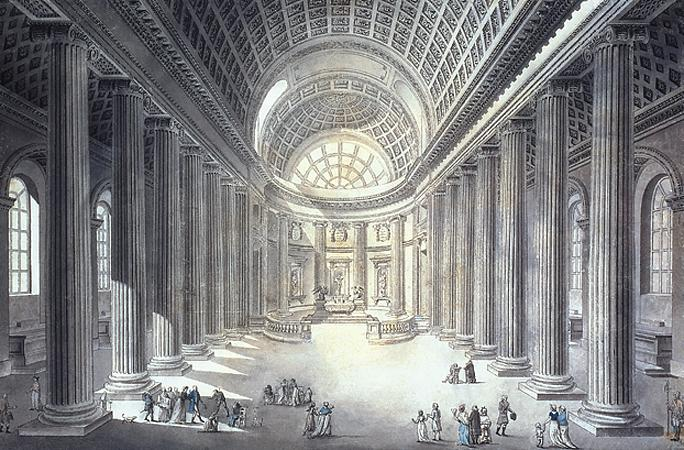
Interior of Église Saint-Philippe-du-Roule, constructed 1774–1784.

In 1764 (Eriksen 1974) he presented his uncompromisingly neoclassical plans for the Church of St. Philippe-du-Roule. Its colossal Ionic order of columns, which separated the barrel-vaulted nave from the lower, barrel-vaulted aisles, was carried around the apse without a break. In this church, which was built 1772–84, he revived a basilica plan that had not been characteristic of French ecclesiastical architecture since the sixteenth century.

In 1775 he was appointed First Architect to the comte de Provence, brother of Louis XVI; he designed the pavilion of the comtesse de Provence at Versailles. In 1779 he was appointed overseer of the building projects of another brother of the king, the comte d'Artois.

In 1777 Chalgrin partly remodelled the interior of Church of Saint-Sulpice, which had been given a thoroughly neoclassical façade by Chalgrin's former master Servandoni over forty years before. He also designed the case for the great organ.

Towards the end of the French Revolution in 1798 Chalgrin threw up the buildings for the first Exposition des produits de l'industrie française, with an extremely tight deadline.

A large circle of porticos surrounded a Temple of Industry that would hold the objects of industries that the jury had selected.

After the Revolution Chalgrin extended the Collège de France and made alterations in the Palais du Luxembourg to suit it to its new use as the seat of the Directoire.

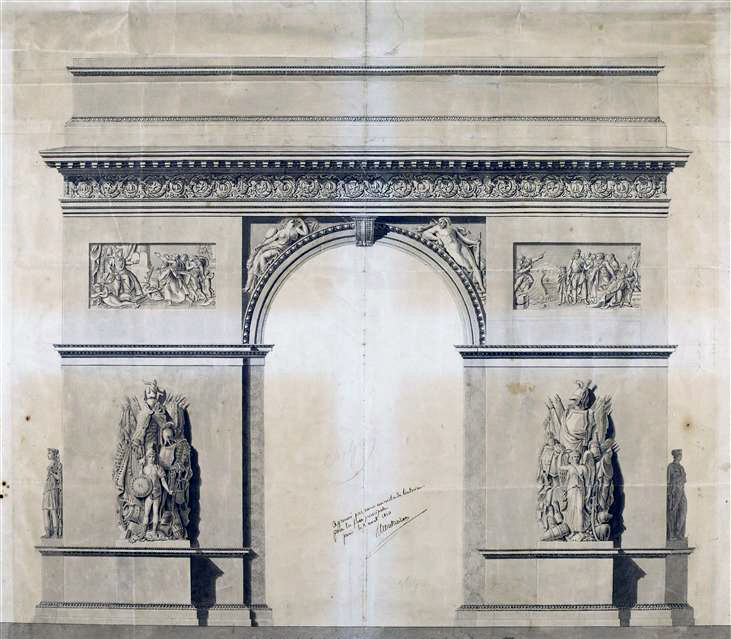
Chalgrin's drawing of the Arc de Triomphe, 1806.

The Arc de Triomphe was commissioned by Napoleon to commemorate the victorious armies of the Empire. In 1806, Chalgrin and Jean-Arnaud Raymond were commissioned to create plans for the Arc, but their respective proposals were incompatible, leading to Raymond's resignation. The project was under way when Chalgrin died, and it was completed by Guillaume-Abel Blouet.

Chalgrin married Émilie, a daughter of the painter Joseph Vernet. They had one son.

== Major works ==
- 1767–1769: Hôtel Saint-Florentin (later the Hôtel de Langeac, which served as Thomas Jefferson's domicile, 1785–89, then the Hôtel Talleyrand-Périgord), for the comte de Saint-Florentin (Paris, 2 rue Saint-Florentin); demolished 1842.
- 1767–1770: Hôtel de Mademoiselle de Luzy (Paris, rue Férou).
- 1774–1780: Additions to the Collège de France (Paris, rue des Écoles).
- Completed 1775: Construction of Claude Nicolas Ledoux's designs for dwellings at Versailles for Madame du Barry and the comtesse de Provence.
- 1777–1780: Restoration of the façade and rebuilding the north tower of Saint-Sulpice (Paris).
- Completed 1778: Hunting lodge, "Rendez-vous de chasse de la Faisanderie" for the comte de Provence (Étiolles, Département Essonne).
- Completed 1778: Chapelle du Saint-Esprit (Paris, rue Lhomond).
- 1780: Ancienne Laiterie de Madame (Versailles, 2 rue Vauban).
- Completed 1780: Music pavilion for the comtesse de Provence (Versailles, 111 avenue de Paris).
- 1774–1784: Église Saint-Philippe-du-Roule (Paris).
- Completed 1785: Pavilion and jardin à l'anglaise "Parc Balbi" (Versailles); destroyed 1798.
- 1799–1805: Works at Palais du Luxembourg, the grand staircase and the "Salon des Messagers d'État" (Paris).
- 1806–1811; completed after Chalgrin's death, in 1836: Arc de Triomphe, Place de l'Étoile (Paris).
- Completed 1807: Restoration of the Théâtre de l'Odéon (Paris); burned 1818.

== Gallery ==
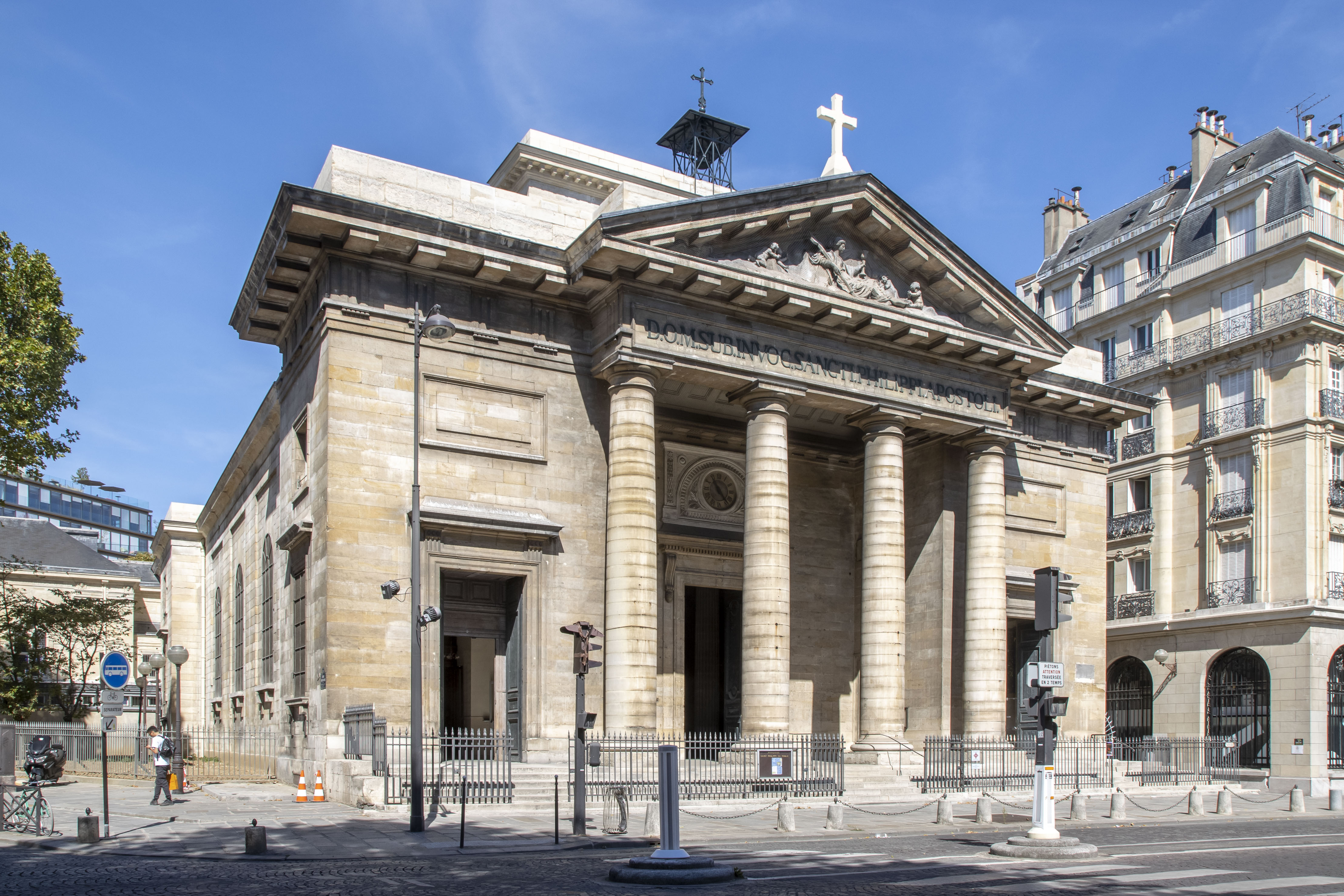
Église Saint-Philippe-du-Roule

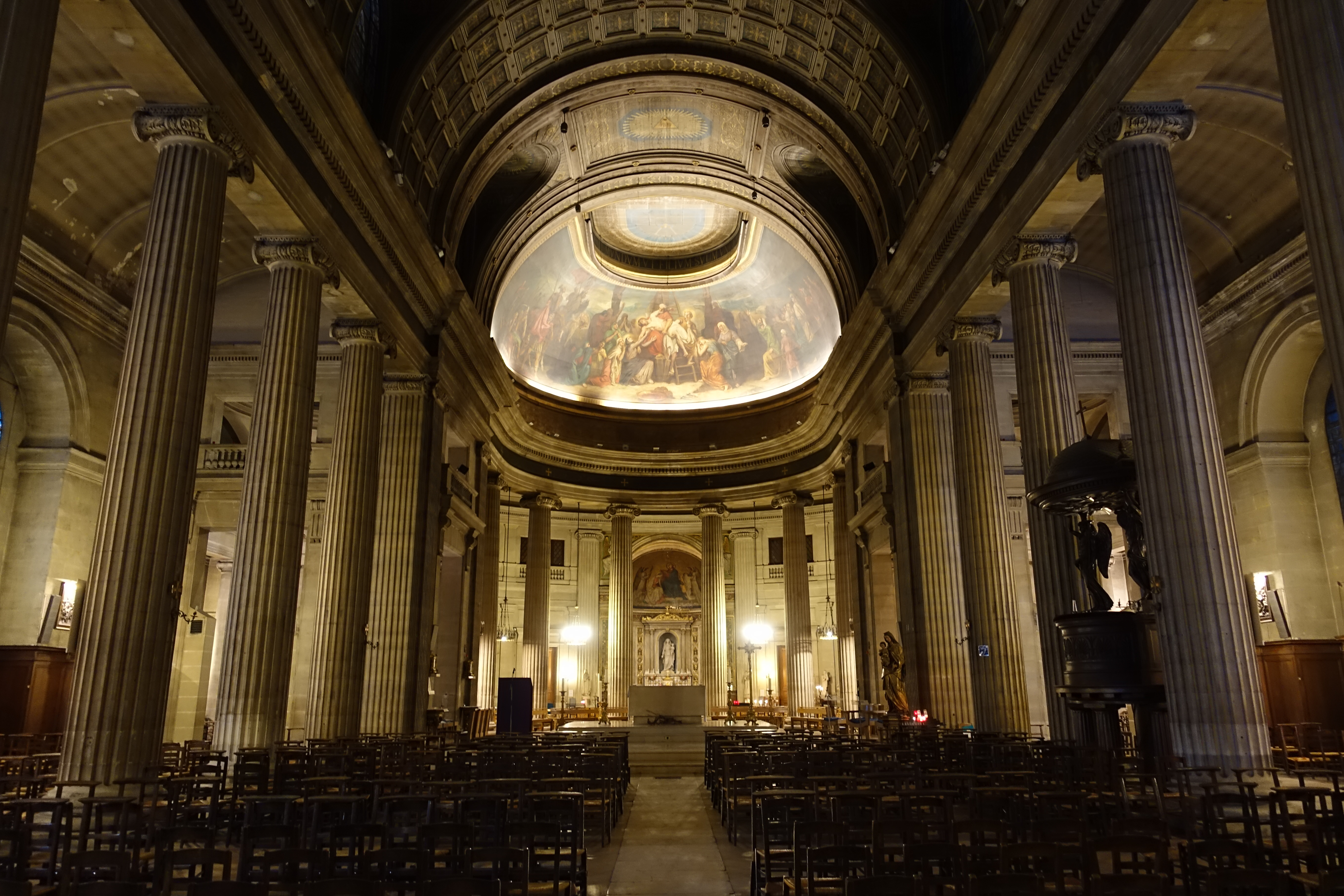
Église Saint-Philippe-du-Roule, interior

Arc de Triomphe

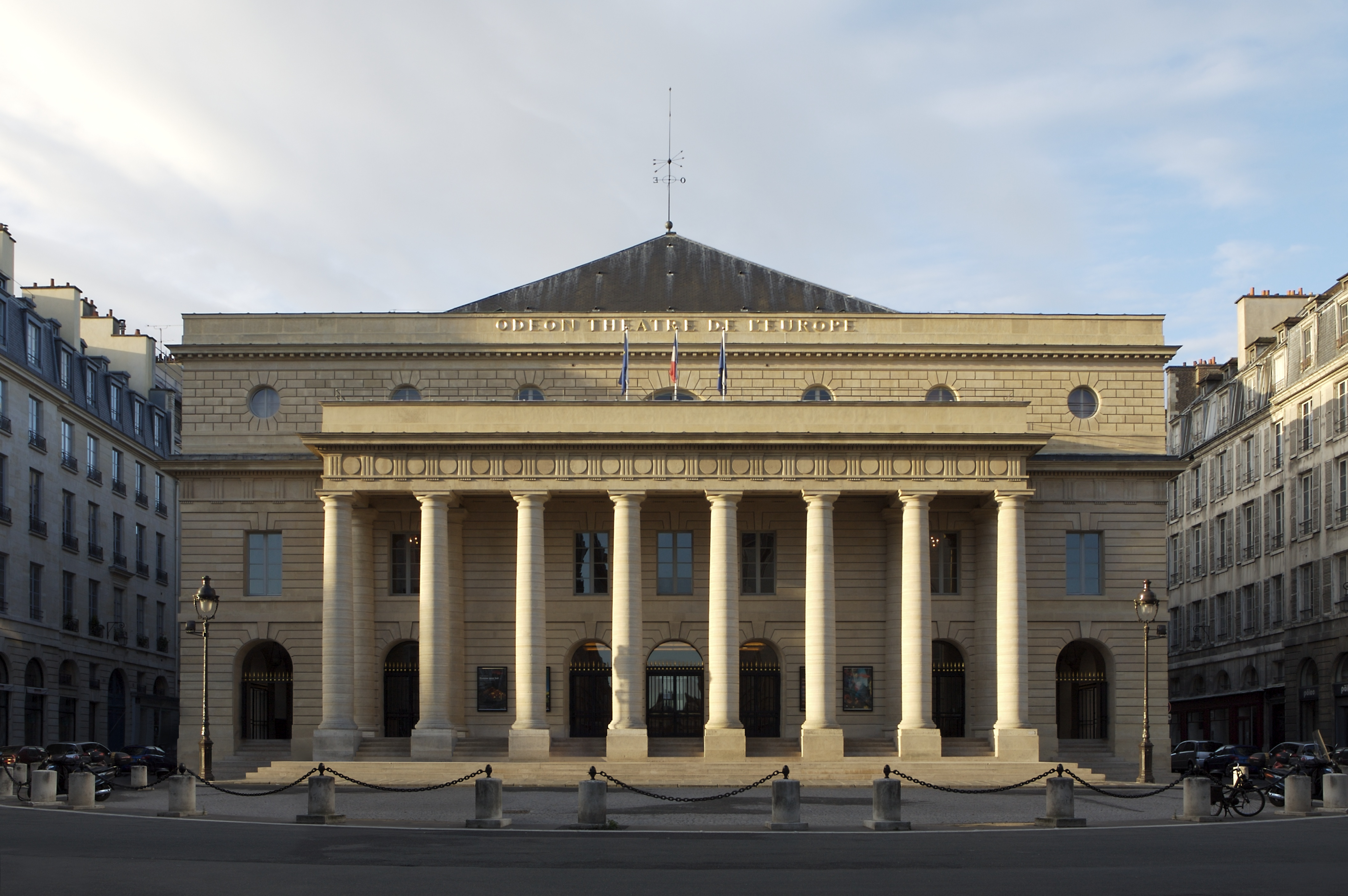
Odéon-Théâtre de l'Europe

== See also ==
- Neoclassicism in France

== Sources ==
- Svend Eriksen, Early Neo-Classicism in France (London: Faber & Faber), 1974. Chalgrin's biography, p. 163.
