= Roland Bocquet =

British composer, pianist and teacher (1878–1956)

Background information
- Born: 3 June 1878; Saharanpur, India
- Origin: Bedford Modern School
- Died: 16 October 1956 (aged 78) Zürich, Switzerland
- Occupations: Composer

Roland Bocquet (3 June 1878 – 16 October 1956) was a British composer, pianist and teacher who for most of his career was based in the city of Dresden, and is chiefly associated with the composition of German Lieder. For the most part his work was rarely heard in Britain and he is now relatively unknown. In Germany, however, he had a limited but devoted following during his lifetime, and his music is still performed.

== Early life ==
Roland Bocquet was born Hugh Rowland Bocquet in Saharanpur, India on 3 June 1878. His father was William Sutton Bocquet, a prominent railway engineer, and his mother Jessie van Zuylen of Nyvelt Gasbeke was a Flemish baroness. He was educated in England at Bedford Modern School and after entering the Royal Military Academy, Woolwich seemed destined for an Army career. However, a year after gaining a commission in the Royal Engineers he resigned from the Army and entered the Royal Academy of Music.

== Career ==
Bocquet moved to Dresden in 1900 and whilst earning his living as a teacher of Music and Mathematics entered the city's bohemian artistic circle. His compositions date from 1902, writing virtuoso piano pieces and Lieder drawn from the poetry of Baudelaire, Hermann Hesse, Friedrich Nietzsche, Max Dauthendey and others. The British composer Arnold Bax who had known Bocquet at the Royal Academy, spent some time with him during a visit to Dresden in 1906 and described him thus: Roland Bocquet was the writer of many very skilful but clearly Strauss-derived lieder. Noticeably handsome, black-haired and moustached, blue-eyed, straight of nose and with a peculiarly beautiful speaking voice, he'd been settled in Dresden for some years and spoke German like a native. He took himself rather Byronically, and posed as a blase cynic.

In 1913 he toured America accompanied by the opera singer Leon Rains (1870-1954) who performed Bocquet's work. In 1914. however, he was interned at the Ruhleben internment camp in Berlin, created to house non-German subjects during the War. The camp became something of a creative melting-pot due to the large number of artists and musicians, some of them left stranded in Germany whilst visiting Bayreuth in 1914, held prisoner there. Two of Bocquets's best known works Juninacht and Lied an einen gefallenen Freund date from this period. The Hessisches Hauptstaatsarchiv Wiesbaden (Germany) keeps a score of his Ballad No. 1 (Opus 22) as arrangement by Frederick Charles Adler (1889–1959), set for the symphony orchestra of Ruhleben internment Camp.

In the 1920s his reputation was consolidated and the Roland Bocquet Society, created in Dresden to encourage the publication and appreciation of his work, flourished. His music was performed at concerts throughout Germany and also in Paris. His Four Songs (Opus 35) was also performed at the Promenade Concerts in London in 1928. His music was again performed in England during BBC Radio broadcasts in 1934 and 1936. In 1936 he was appointed Professor of Music Theory at the Dresden Conservatory.

== Later life ==
From the late 1930s Bocquet becomes an increasingly obscure figure and no new compositions date from this time. He also seems to have developed sympathies for the Nazis, although as he never joined the Party this may not be attributable to a genuine conviction. He remained in Germany during World War II, later removing to Meißen and 1954 to Zürich in Switzerland. He died suddenly from a heart attack at Zürich on 16 October 1956.
