= Heredia, Álava =

Hamlet in Álava, Spain

Heredia
- Concejo
- Location within Álava Location within the Basque Country Location within Spain
- Coordinates: 42°52′42″N 2°26′39″W
- Country: Spain
- Autonomous community: Basque Country
- Province: Álava
- Comarca: Llanada Alavesa
- Municipality: Barrundia

Area
  - Total: 9.77 km^{2} (3.77 sq mi)
- Elevation: 595 m (1,952 ft)

Population (2022)
  - Total: 75
  - Density: 7.7/km^{2} (20/sq mi)
- Postal code: 01206

Heredia (Basque: Deredia) is a hamlet and concejo located in the municipality of Barrundia, in Álava province, Basque Country, Spain.
