= List of highways numbered 103 =

Highway 103 can refer to multiple roads:

== Belgium ==
- N103 (Belgium)

== Canada ==
- New Brunswick Route 103
- Nova Scotia Provincial Highway 103
- Ontario Highway 103 (former)
- Prince Edward Island Route 103

== China ==
- China National Highway 103

== Costa Rica ==
- National Route 103

== Croatia ==
- D103 road

== Germany ==
- Bundesautobahn 103

== India ==
- National Highway 103 (India)

== Ireland ==
- R103 road (Ireland)

== Japan ==
- Japan National Route 103

== Nigeria ==
- F103 highway (Nigeria)

== Philippines ==
- N103 highway (Philippines)

== South Africa ==
- R103 (South Africa)

== United Kingdom ==
- A103 road in north London.

== United States ==
- Alabama State Route 103
  - County Route 103 (Lee County, Alabama)
- Arkansas Highway 103
- California State Route 103
- Colorado State Highway 103
- Connecticut Route 103
- Florida State Road 103
  - County Road 103 (Duval County, Florida)
- Georgia State Route 103
- Illinois Route 103
- Indiana State Road 103
- Iowa Highway 103 (former)
- K-103 (Kansas highway)
- Kentucky Route 103
- Louisiana Highway 103
- Maine State Route 103
- Maryland Route 103
  - Maryland Route 103A
  - Maryland Route 103C
- Massachusetts Route 103
- M-103 (Michigan highway)
- Minnesota State Highway 103 (former)
  - County Road 103 (Hennepin County, Minnesota)
- Missouri Route 103
- Nebraska Highway 103
- New Hampshire Route 103
  - New Hampshire Route 103A
- County Route 103 (Ocean County, New Jersey)
- New Mexico State Road 103
- New York State Route 103
  - County Route 103 (Albany County, New York)
  - County Route 103 (Cayuga County, New York)
  - County Route 103 (Cortland County, New York)
  - County Route 103 (Dutchess County, New York)
  - County Route 103 (Fulton County, New York)
  - County Route 103 (Montgomery County, New York)
  - County Route 103 (Onondaga County, New York)
  - County Route 103 (Orleans County, New York)
  - County Route 103 (Rensselaer County, New York)
  - County Route 103 (Steuben County, New York)
  - County Route 103 (Suffolk County, New York)
  - County Route 103 (Sullivan County, New York)
  - County Route 103 (Tompkins County, New York)
    - County Route 103A (Tompkins County, New York)
    - County Route 103B (Tompkins County, New York)
  - County Route 103 (Wayne County, New York)
  - County Route 103 (Westchester County, New York)
- North Carolina Highway 103
- Ohio State Route 103
- Oklahoma State Highway 103 (former)
- Oregon Route 103
- Pennsylvania Route 103
- Rhode Island Route 103
  - Rhode Island Route 103A
- Tennessee State Route 103
- Texas State Highway 103
  - Texas State Highway Spur 103 (former)
  - Farm to Market Road 103
- Utah State Route 103
- Vermont Route 103
- Virginia State Route 103
  - Virginia State Route 103 (1928-1933) (former)
- Washington State Route 103
- West Virginia Route 103
- Wisconsin Highway 103

Territories

- Puerto Rico Highway 103

== See also ==
- A103
- List of national roads in Latvia § P103

Preceded by 102	Lists of highways 103	Succeeded by 104
