= List of highways numbered 101 =

Route 101 or Highway 101 can refer to multiple roads:

== International ==
- European route E101

== Argentina ==
- National Route 101

== Australia ==
- Southern Ports Highway
- Princes Highway (East)

== Brazil ==
- BR-101

== Canada ==
- British Columbia Highway 101
- Manitoba Highway 101 (Perimeter Highway)
- New Brunswick Route 101
- Newfoundland and Labrador Route 101
- Nova Scotia Highway 101
- Ontario Highway 101
- Prince Edward Island Route 101
- Quebec Route 101

== China ==
- National Highway 101

== Costa Rica ==
- National Route 101

== Cuba ==
- Autopista del Mediodía (2-101)
- Cárdenas–Coliseo Road (3-101)

== Ireland ==
- R101 road (North Circular Road, Dublin)

== Japan ==
- Japan National Route 101

== Mexico ==
- Mexican Federal Highway 101

== Nigeria ==
- F101 highway (Nigeria)

== Philippines ==
- N101 highway (Philippines)

== Russia ==
- Russian route A130, formerly A101

== United Kingdom ==
- A101, Rotherhithe Tunnel
- B101 road

== United States ==
- U.S. Route 101
  - U.S. Route 101 (Maine) (cancelled auxiliary route proposal)
- Alabama State Route 101
  - County Route 101 (Lee County, Alabama)
- Arizona State Route 101
- Arkansas Highway 101
- Colorado State Highway 101
- Connecticut Route 101
- Florida State Road 101
  - County Road 101A (Duval County, Florida)
- Georgia State Route 101
- Illinois Route 101
- Indiana State Road 101
- K-101 (Kansas highway)
- Kentucky Route 101
- Louisiana Highway 101
- Maine State Route 101
- Maryland Route 101 (former)
- Massachusetts Route 101
- M-101 (Michigan highway) (former)
- Minnesota State Highway 101
  - County Road 101 (Hennepin County, Minnesota)
  - County Road 101 (Scott County, Minnesota)
- Missouri Route 101
  - Missouri Route 101 (1929) (former)
- Nebraska Highway 101 (former)
- New Hampshire Route 101
  - New Hampshire Route 101A
  - New Hampshire Route 101B (former)
  - New Hampshire Route 101C (former)
  - New Hampshire Route 101D (former)
  - New Hampshire Route 101E
- New Jersey Route 101 (former)
  - County Route 101 (Bergen County, New Jersey)
  - County Route 101 (Ocean County, New Jersey)
- New Mexico State Road 101
- New York State Route 101
  - County Route 101 (Cattaraugus County, New York)
  - County Route 101 (Cayuga County, New York)
  - County Route 101 (Cortland County, New York)
  - County Route 101 (Dutchess County, New York)
  - County Route 101 (Fulton County, New York)
  - County Route 101 (Nassau County, New York)
  - County Route 101 (Orleans County, New York)
  - County Route 101 (Seneca County, New York)
  - County Route 101 (Suffolk County, New York)
  - County Route 101 (Tompkins County, New York)
  - County Route 101 (Wayne County, New York)
- North Carolina Highway 101
- Ohio State Route 101
- Oklahoma State Highway 101
- Pennsylvania Route 101 (former)
- Rhode Island Route 101
- South Carolina Highway 101
- South Dakota Highway 101
- Tennessee State Route 101
- Texas State Highway 101
  - Texas State Highway Spur 101 (former)
  - Farm to Market Road 101
- Utah State Route 101
- Vermont Route 101
- Virginia State Route 101
- West Virginia Route 101
- Wisconsin Highway 101

Territories

- Puerto Rico Highway 101

== Uruguay ==
- Route 101

== See also ==
- A101
- B101 road
- D101 road
- P101
- R101 road

Preceded by 100	Lists of highways 101	Succeeded by 102
