= List of highways numbered 102 =

Route 102 or Highway 102 can refer to multiple roads:

== China ==
- China National Highway 102

== Canada ==
- New Brunswick Route 102
- Newfoundland and Labrador Route 102
- Nova Scotia Highway 102
- Ontario Highway 102
- Prince Edward Island Route 102
- Saskatchewan Highway 102

== Costa Rica ==
- National Route 102

== Cuba ==
- N–102–C

== India ==
- National Highway 102 (India)

== Ireland ==
- R102 road (Ireland)

== Japan ==
- Japan National Route 102

== South Korea ==
- Namhae Expressway Branch 1

== Nigeria ==
- F102 highway (Nigeria)

== Philippines ==
- N102 highway (Philippines)

== United Kingdom ==
- A102 road in London, England
- B102 road

== United States ==
- U.S. Route 102 (former)
- Alabama State Route 102
  - County Route 102 (Lee County, Alabama)
- Arkansas Highway 102
- California State Route 102 (unconstructed)
- Colorado State Highway 102 (former)
- Connecticut Route 102
- Florida State Road 102
  - County Road 102 (Levy County, Florida)
- Georgia State Route 102
- Illinois Route 102
- Indiana State Road 102 (former)
- Iowa Highway 102
- K-102 (Kansas highway)
- Kentucky Route 102
- Louisiana Highway 102
- Maine State Route 102
- Maryland Route 102 (former)
- Massachusetts Route 102
- M-102 (Michigan highway)
- Minnesota State Highway 102
  - County Road 102 (Anoka County, Minnesota)
  - County Road 102 (St. Louis County, Minnesota)
- Missouri Route 102
  - Missouri Route 102 (1929) (former)
- Nebraska Highway 102 (former)
- New Hampshire Route 102
- County Route 102 (Bergen County, New Jersey)
- New Mexico State Road 102
- New York State Route 102
  - County Route 102 (Albany County, New York)
  - County Route 102 (Cayuga County, New York)
  - County Route 102 (Cortland County, New York)
  - County Route 102 (Montgomery County, New York)
  - County Route 102 (Orleans County, New York)
  - County Route 102 (Schenectady County, New York)
  - County Route 102 (Seneca County, New York)
  - County Route 102 (Suffolk County, New York)
  - County Route 102 (Sullivan County, New York)
  - County Route 102 (Tompkins County, New York)
  - County Route 102 (Wayne County, New York)
- North Carolina Highway 102
- Ohio State Route 102 (former)
- Oklahoma State Highway 102
- Pennsylvania Route 102
- Rhode Island Route 102
- South Carolina Highway 102
- Tennessee State Route 102
- Texas State Highway 102
  - Texas State Highway Spur 102
  - Farm to Market Road 102
- Utah State Route 102
- Vermont Route 102
- Virginia State Route 102
  - Virginia State Route 102 (1923-1928)
  - Virginia State Route 102 (1928-1933)
  - Virginia State Route 102 (1933-1951)
- Washington State Route 102
- West Virginia Route 102
- Wisconsin Highway 102

Territories

- Puerto Rico Highway 102

== See also ==
- A102 road
- D102 road
- N102 (Bangladesh)
- R102 road (Ireland)
- R102 (South Africa)

Preceded by 101	Lists of highways 102	Succeeded by 103
