= Luchamania Costa Rica =

- Official logo
- Founded: 1990
- Style: Professional wrestling
- Headquarters: San José, Costa Rica
- Owner: Rafael Ramírez
- Website: luchamaniacostarica.com

Luchamania Costa Rica is a Costa Rican independent professional wrestling promotion founded in 1990. Based in San José, it is currently administrated by Rafael Ramírez.

== History ==
=== Background ===
Professional wrestling has its roots in combat practices and physical exhibitions that date back to antiquity. Worldwide, various forms of wrestling have been documented since prehistoric times, as evidenced by pictorial representations found in Asia, the Middle East, and Africa. In ancient civilizations such as Mesopotamia, Egypt, Greece, and China, wrestling was part of ceremonial rituals, athletic competitions, and military training.

During the 19th century, particularly in Europe and North America, wrestling began to develop as a public spectacle, presented at fairs, carnivals, and theaters. From this evolution emerged styles such as Greco-Roman wrestling and, later, modern professional wrestling, characterized by a combination of athletic technique, theatrical storytelling, and entertainment.

In Latin America, countries such as Mexico and Guatemala played a significant role in the diffusion of professional wrestling during the first half of the 20th century, directly influencing the development of the sport-entertainment format in Central America, including Costa Rica.

=== First Generation (1962) ===
By the early 1960s, professional wrestling had established itself as a relevant form of entertainment in Costa Rica, to the extent that it occupied high-profile venues such as the Gimnasio Nacional. An example of this is the event announced in February 1962, which featured an international professional wrestling card with the participation of ten wrestlers from various countries, including Mexico, Colombia, Argentina, Spain, and Africa. Performers such as El Bucanero, El Asesino, Halcón Negro, La Cebra, La Sombra, and Caníbal Congolés reflected the strong foreign influence that characterized this initial stage. Matches were organized under professional formats, including singles bouts, tag team matches, defined time limits, and the presence of referees and timekeepers. This demonstrates that professional wrestling in Costa Rica, although still lacking a solid base of local talent, already possessed a formal structure and a clear narrative centered on the confrontation between villains (rudos) and heroes (técnicos). This context marked the starting point of the First Generation, a period dominated by international figures that captured public interest and laid the groundwork for the later development of Costa Rican professional wrestlers capable of sustaining the sport locally.

One of the key venues for the formal emergence of professional wrestling in Costa Rica was the Gimnasio Súper Hércules, located in Cinco Esquinas, Tibás, originally dedicated to weightlifting and physical training. During this period, Manuel Bolaños (father) and Rogelio Bolaños played important roles as early promoters of the discipline. Subsequently, Manuel Bolaños (son), the gym's administrator, became interested in learning professional wrestling and established contact with foreign wrestlers visiting the country. These interactions facilitated the training of the first generation of Costa Rican professional wrestlers.

Wrestlers from Colombia and Guatemala contributed to local training, giving rise to figures who would mark the beginning of Costa Rican professional wrestling. Among the most representative names of this generation are Chaparrito de Oro, El Buitre, El Beduino, Príncipe, El Universitario, Alí el Exótico, El Bombero de Escazú, El Cuervo Ramonense, and Pulguita Oviedo, among others.

By the mid-1960s, wrestling had achieved a level of institutional recognition within Costa Rican sports. In April 1964, during the traditional ceremony organized by the Círculo de Periodistas y Locutores Deportivos de Costa Rica at the Gimnasio Eddy Cortés, wrestling was included among the sports honored, alongside established disciplines such as football, athletics, boxing, and judo. On that time, Manuel Bolaños was awarded a certificate as one of the outstanding figures of the previous year in the wrestling category, confirming his dual role as an active competitor and a key figure in the sport's development. The event also featured a wrestling exhibition between Chaparrito de Oro and Exótico Galán, highlighting the sport's performative and entertainment function within formal sporting events.

Between 1963 and 1966, the name Chaparrito de Oro appeared consistently in the national sports press, consolidating his status as one of the most representative figures of Costa Rican professional wrestling during the 1960s. Far from serving in an administrative role, Chaparrito de Oro, Manuel Bolaños' ring name, was an active technical wrestler and a central figure in major events held at emblematic venues such as the Gimnasio Hércules in Tibás and the Gimnasio Eddy Cortés. His matches, frequently described as the most competitive of the night, showcased his mastery of technical grappling and advanced double-team maneuvers such as the Macetero, Double Tapatía, and Double Corkscrew. In 1964, he was recognized by the press as Wrestler of the Year and even headlined international main events alongside foreign wrestlers.

By 1966, Chaparrito de Oro was described as a fan favorite, participating in intense rivalries that reflected the high dramatic and physical demands of the spectacle, to the point of prompting journalistic reflections on the boundaries between fiction and reality in professional wrestling. His consistent presence and public impact position him as one of the fundamental pillars of the first major era of professional wrestling in Costa Rica.

=== Bronze Generation (1971) ===
During the first half of the 1970s, professional wrestling in Costa Rica experienced a stage of consolidation characterized by an increase in active wrestlers, diversification of styles, and greater public exposure. By 1971, participation was estimated at between 30 and 40 national wrestlers, several of whom had international projection, such as El Buitre, El Beduino, El Cavernario, Lolo el Hermoso, El Estilista, La Saeta, and El Escorpión Negro, among others.

The figure of Chaparrito de Oro stood out during this period, recognized as the Central American welterweight champion and as a trainer of numerous Costa Rican wrestlers, contributing his experience to sustaining the national wrestling movement. Under his leadership, professional wrestling began to move from traditional venues such as Cinco Esquinas toward larger arenas like the Gimnasio Nacional, evidencing an incipient process of professionalization. Although the activity continued to face economic and structural limitations, the enthusiasm of its participants and the incorporation of foreign wrestlers from countries such as Guatemala, Venezuela, and Ecuador strengthened the spectacle and laid the groundwork for future development.

This period also saw a phase of reorganization and internal debate within Costa Rican professional wrestling. Various companies and promoters emerged, seeking to establish more formal structures for wrestler representation and event organization. During this time, Víctor Hugo Ramírez Calderón, known by his ring name El Brumoso, entered the scene, having been trained under the influence of the previous generation. His contribution proved decisive not only in professional wrestling but also in the introduction and development of Olympic and Greco-Roman wrestling in Costa Rica during the 1980s. Alongside him, other active wrestlers from this era were later recognized as historical figures of the sport in commemorative events.

=== Platinum Generation (1985) ===
The so-called Platinum Generation is characterized by the consolidation of a training model based on Olympic and Greco-Roman wrestling as the foundation for the development of professional wrestlers in Costa Rica. This approach marked a transitional stage between the empirical learning of earlier decades and a structured professionalization process aimed at institutional and sporting recognition.

During this period, the Federación Costarricense de Luchas was formally established and recognized by the International Amateur Wrestling Federation (FILA), becoming part of the Olympic movement. This process transformed wrestling from an informal activity into a legally recognized sports structure, generating a significant generational shift and highlighting tensions between wrestlers trained under different systems, while consolidating a new era defined by systematic training and international competition.

The evolution toward this model followed the initial training efforts developed at the Gimnasio Súper Hércules in Tibás under the direction of Manuel Bolaños, known as Chaparrito de Oro, a key figure of the empirical era. Within this context, the influence of Víctor Hugo Ramírez Calderón, known as El Brumoso, emerged as central to the modernization of both professional and Olympic wrestling in Costa Rica.

In the early 1970s, Ramírez obtained a government scholarship that allowed him to travel to Mexico, where he gained direct exposure to Olympic wrestling training systems. From this experience, he concluded that professional wrestling required a solid foundation in Olympic disciplines such as freestyle and Greco-Roman wrestling, a model he later promoted in Costa Rica.

Upon returning to the country, Ramírez dedicated himself to training athletes of different ages, encouraging participation in national and international competitions and managing Costa Rica's formal recognition by the International Olympic Committee (IOC) and FILA. This process unfolded under limited economic and logistical conditions, including the lack of regulation wrestling mats. Through personal efforts, Ramírez secured the donation of a mat in Mexico, which, after administrative difficulties, was incorporated into national training facilities in San José.

Víctor Hugo Ramírez's contribution is considered fundamental to the transition from a predominantly empirical stage of professional wrestling to a structured model with sporting foundations, legal recognition, and integration into the international Olympic system. In 2013, his work was formally recognized during a visit by a FILA delegation to Costa Rica, at which time he had accumulated more than four decades of active involvement in the development of wrestling in the country.

=== Golden Generation (1990) ===
The Golden Generation is associated with the emergence of projects aimed at modernizing the professional wrestling spectacle through the incorporation of production elements such as lighting, music, narrative structure, and digital media presence.

From the late 20th century into the early 21st century, professional wrestling in Costa Rica entered a new phase with the consolidation of Luchamania Costa Rica as a stable promoter of sports entertainment. With more than three decades of continuous activity, the organization progressively transformed the style of its events, moving away from models characterized by extreme violence and adopting an approach oriented toward family audiences, while preserving traditional narrative elements of professional wrestling. During this period, influences from both Mexican and American wrestling were integrated, alongside an emphasis on wrestler safety, injury reduction, and long-term talent development. This model redefined the wrestling spectacle in the country and consolidated a new generation of wrestlers and promoters. The company became one of the principal platforms for the dissemination of professional wrestling in Costa Rica.

By the late 1990s, Costa Rican professional wrestling was experiencing one of its most consolidated periods, reflected in both the number of active wrestlers and the formal organization of national championships. An example of this was the event held in April 1999 at the Gimnasio Moreno Cartín in Barrio Cuba, where leading national wrestlers competed in a program dedicated exclusively to championship matches. The event featured a national tag team championship contested through a battle royal involving ten teams, as well as the national championship, defended by Panckro against challenger América Express. These events, held in neighborhood gymnasiums with affordable ticket prices, illustrate the strong social roots of professional wrestling in urban communities and its direct connection with the public. Additionally, the weekly broadcast of the program Luchamania y su Afición on Channel 42 (UHF band) confirms that professional wrestling had expanded beyond the ring to become a regular media product. This period represents the peak of the Golden Generation, during which Luchamania consolidated its position as the country's main organizational reference and laid the foundation for subsequent developments.

=== Diamond Generation (2019) ===
From 2019 onward, professional wrestling in Costa Rica entered a stage characterized by the production of large-scale events, with attendance exceeding one thousand spectators and reaching figures of up to six thousand in certain venues.

This era is marked by strategic alliances and the participation of internationally recognized wrestlers, primarily from Mexico and other countries, expanding the reach and visibility of the spectacle within the country. The Diamond Generation consists of wrestlers trained under conditions different from those of previous generations, with greater media exposure and experience in large-scale events.

In the contemporary training process of Costa Rican professional wrestling, trainer and promoter Rafael Ramírez has stated that his father, Víctor Hugo Ramírez, prior to his passing, documented sixty-three technical and conceptual fundamentals that he considered essential for the development of the sport in Costa Rica. According to Rafael Ramírez, this material was later systematically applied in training programs, serving as the foundation for the preparation of new generations of wrestlers.

On 3 October 2025, the Centro de Alto Rendimiento Luchamania, a performance training center, was officially inaugurated in Sabana Sur, San José, with the objective of strengthening the technical and physical training of new professional wrestlers in Costa Rica.
