= A1 in London =

Numbered road in Britain

A1

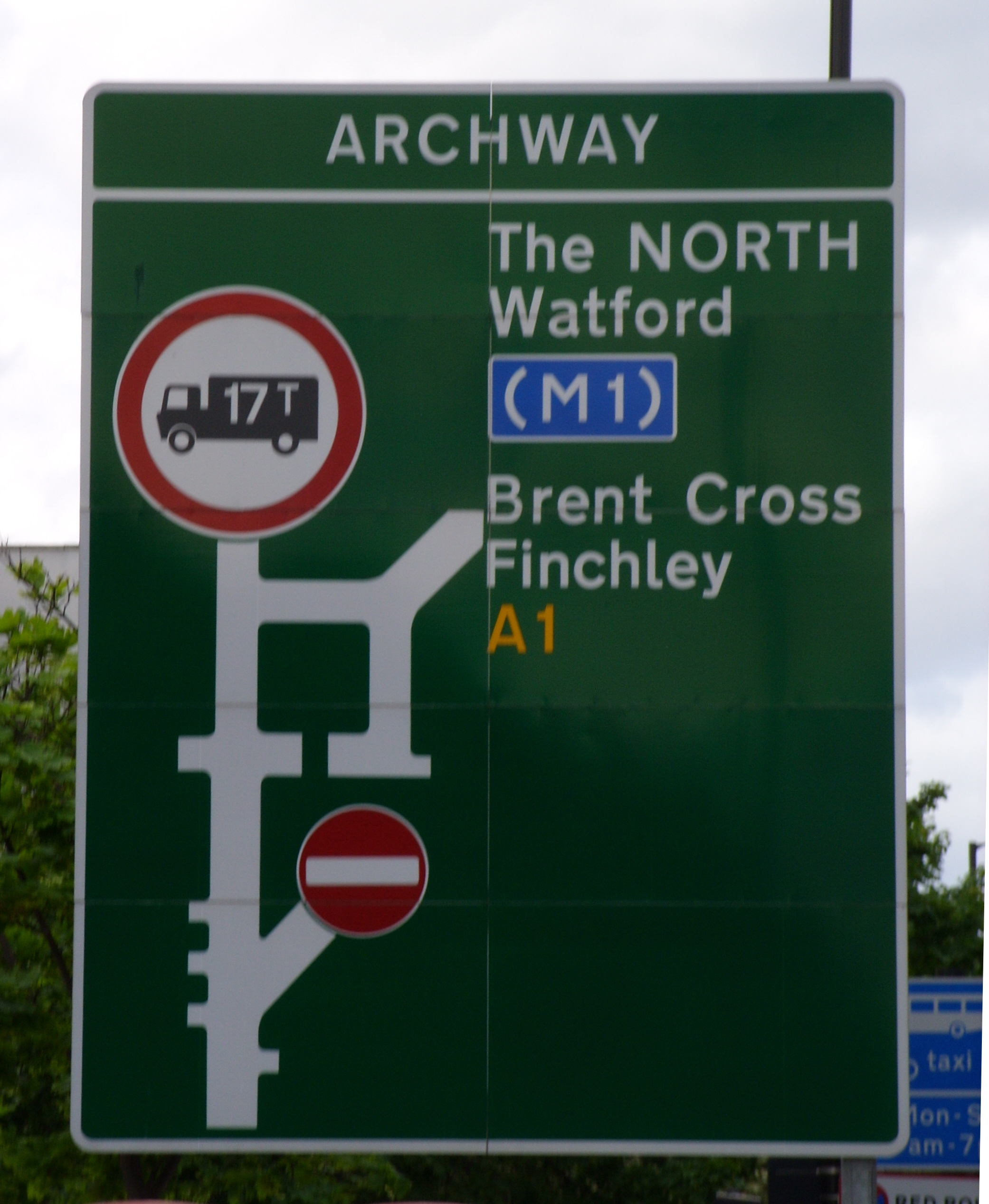
- The junction at the Archway before 2017

Major junctions
- South end: City of London
- North end: Continues to Edinburgh

Location
- Country: United Kingdom

Road network
- Roads in the United Kingdom; Motorways; A and B road zones

The A1 in London is the southern part of the A1 road. It starts at Aldersgate in the City of London, passing through the capital to Borehamwood on the northern fringe of Greater London, before continuing to Edinburgh. The road travels through the City and three London boroughs: Islington, Haringey and Barnet, which include the districts of Islington, Holloway, Highgate, Hendon and Mill Hill, and travels along Upper Street and Holloway Road, crossing the North Circular Road in Hendon, a district in the London Borough of Barnet.

The A1 is the most recent in a series of routes north out of London to York and beyond. It was designated in 1921 by the Ministry of Transport under the Great Britain road numbering scheme, comprising existing roads and streets, mostly historic, and later using stretches of purpose-built new roads in what is now the outer London borough of Barnet. In 1829 Thomas Telford's assistant John Macneill gave the Archway Road section footings of Roman cement with side drains, an innovative technique used there for the first time and the basis for modern road building. The route closely follows the historic route of the Great North Road, though from 1954 it has diverted round the congested suburbs of Finchley and High Barnet along modern roads constructed in the 1920s and 1930s.

The A1 is one of London's main roads, providing a link to the M1 and the A1(M) motorways, and on to the Midlands, Northern England and Scotland. Despite this, its main use is to connect a number of neighbourhoods within north London; less than 5% of its vehicles are through traffic – the bulk is local. The roads along which the A1 route travels are the shared responsibility of the local boroughs, the Greater London Authority, and the British Government via the Department for Transport.

== History ==
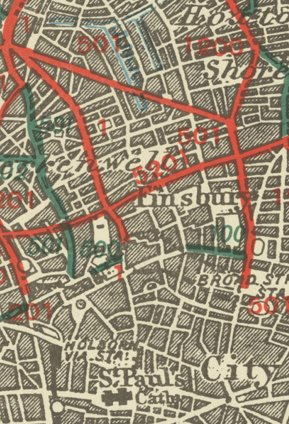
The start of the A1 in London at the time of classification in 1921

The A1 is the latest in a series of routes north from London to York and beyond, and was formed in 1921 by the Ministry of Transport as part of the Great Britain road numbering scheme. The earliest documented northern routes out of London are the roads created by the Romans during the period 43 to 410 AD, which consisted of a variety of "Iters" on the Antonine Itinerary, a combination of which were used by the Anglo-Saxons as the route from London to York, and which became known as Ermine Street. Ermine Street later became known as the Old North Road, and is used within London by the current A10. By the 12th century, because of flooding and damage by traffic on Ermine Street, an alternative route out of London was found through Islington and Muswell Hill, and this was the origin of the Great North Road that would become the A1. Until the 14th century the route went up what is now Hornsey Road – the A103 road, but when that became impassable a new route along Holloway Road via Highgate was created in the 14th century. The section through Highgate was bypassed in the early 19th century by the creation of a new road, Archway Road, and around the same time a turnpike road, New North Road and Canonbury Road (the A1200 road), was constructed linking the start of the Old North Road around Shoreditch with the Great North Road at Highbury Corner.

The route of the A1 in London originally started at Aldersgate Bars, which marked the boundary of the City of London, and followed the Great North Road mail coach route through Barnet; the route was re-designated in 1954 to follow the East Finchley and Barnet by-passes built in the 1920s and 1930s, so within London the coaching route is now mainly only followed when passing through the borough of Islington. During the early 1970s plans to widen the A1 along the Archway Road section were abandoned after considerable opposition and four public inquiries during which road protesters disrupted proceedings. The scheme was finally dropped in 1990.

== Governance ==
Responsibility for the roads along which the A1 route travels are shared by the individual local boroughs, the Greater London Authority (GLA), and the British Government. The first organised London-wide authority dealing with roads in London was the Metropolitan Board of Works (MBW), set up in 1856. The MBW replaced the disparate turnpike trusts which had already been amalgamated in 1826 into the single control of Government Commissioners, and was itself replaced by the London County Council (LCC) in 1889. The LCC became the Greater London Council (GLC) in 1965, and during the 1960s when traffic management in London was being modernised, and the London Ringways was proposed, the GLC, which was not in favour of increasing traffic into central London, had control of the inner London roads, while the government, through the Ministry of Transport, which was in favour of widening roads, had control of outer London. These different approaches resulted in the Ministry of Transport widening a stretch of the A1 until it reached the control of the GLC, when the widening abruptly stopped.

Due to the problems associated with two different and opposing bodies having responsibility for London's roads, the government were keen to take control of the major routes, and made plans in 1983 for the Department of Transport to take over 70 miles of road, including significant parts of the A1; when the GLC was abolished in 1986, the Department of Transport took over direct control of the 70 miles of major routes, plus had a significant influence on another 300. In 2000 control of roads in London passed to Transport for London, a department of GLA created in 2000 as part of the Greater London Authority Act 1999, and the major roads, including the A1, were declassified as trunk roads.

== Route ==
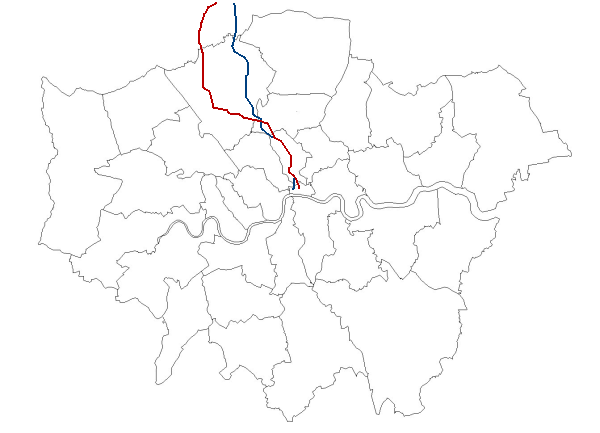
The current route of the A1 (red) and the historic route of the Great North Road (blue)

The route of the A1 in London runs from the northern end of St. Martin's Le Grand in the City to Borehamwood in Hertfordshire, then travels on the northern fringe of Greater London to Bignell's Corner, where it crosses the M25 and becomes a motorway, designated A1(M), which alternates with the dual carriageway A1 as it continues to Edinburgh. The London section of the road passes through part of the City of London and three London boroughs: Islington, Haringey and Barnet. The A1 is one of London's main northern routes, providing a link to the M1 motorway and the A1(M) motorway, and on to the Midlands, Northern England and Scotland. It connects a number of major areas within London, and sections of it serve as the High Street for many of the now-joined villages that make up north London. Even though it is one of London's major roads, less than 5% of its approximate 60,000 vehicles a day are through traffic – the bulk is local.

=== City of London ===
The current start of the A1 is the modern roundabout at the northern end of St. Martin's Le Grand where it meets Aldersgate Street, near the site of the now demolished General Post Office, London, the headquarters of the Post Office from 1829 to 1910. When originally designated in 1921 the A1 started a little further north along Aldersgate Street at Aldersgate Bars, which marked the boundary of the City, though some later maps indicate it starting at the southern end of St. Martin's Le Grand, near St Paul's Cathedral. The route runs north from Aldersgate along Aldersgate Street which is a modern dual carriageway, and from the 13th century was known as a wide street with fine buildings and travellers' inns; these were destroyed or badly damaged during the Blitz, and from 1965 to 1976 the 40 acre (162,000m²) Barbican Estate, an arts complex and residential estate, was constructed along the entire eastern side of the street. At the end of Aldersgate Street stood Aldersgate Bars, which marked the limits of the City of London.

=== Islington ===
The route enters the London Borough of Islington at Goswell Road, becoming a single carriageway running north from the border of the City to Angel through a mix of offices and urban housing. Goswell Road and St John Street were the ancient routes from the City to Islington, with St John Street being the start of the Great North Road until the General Post Office headquarters was built at St Martin's-le-Grand in 1829, whereafter stagecoaches used Aldersgate Street and Goswell Road. The New River originally flowed across Goswell Road, but is now underground and no trace of it can be seen at the surface. The street was reported in 1720 to be "meanly built and inhabited", containing numerous inns and brothels, and it largely remained a slum area until the rebuilding that took place after the Second World War – in particular the residential development outward from the Barbican and Golden Lane estates since 1980, replacing warehouses with flats.

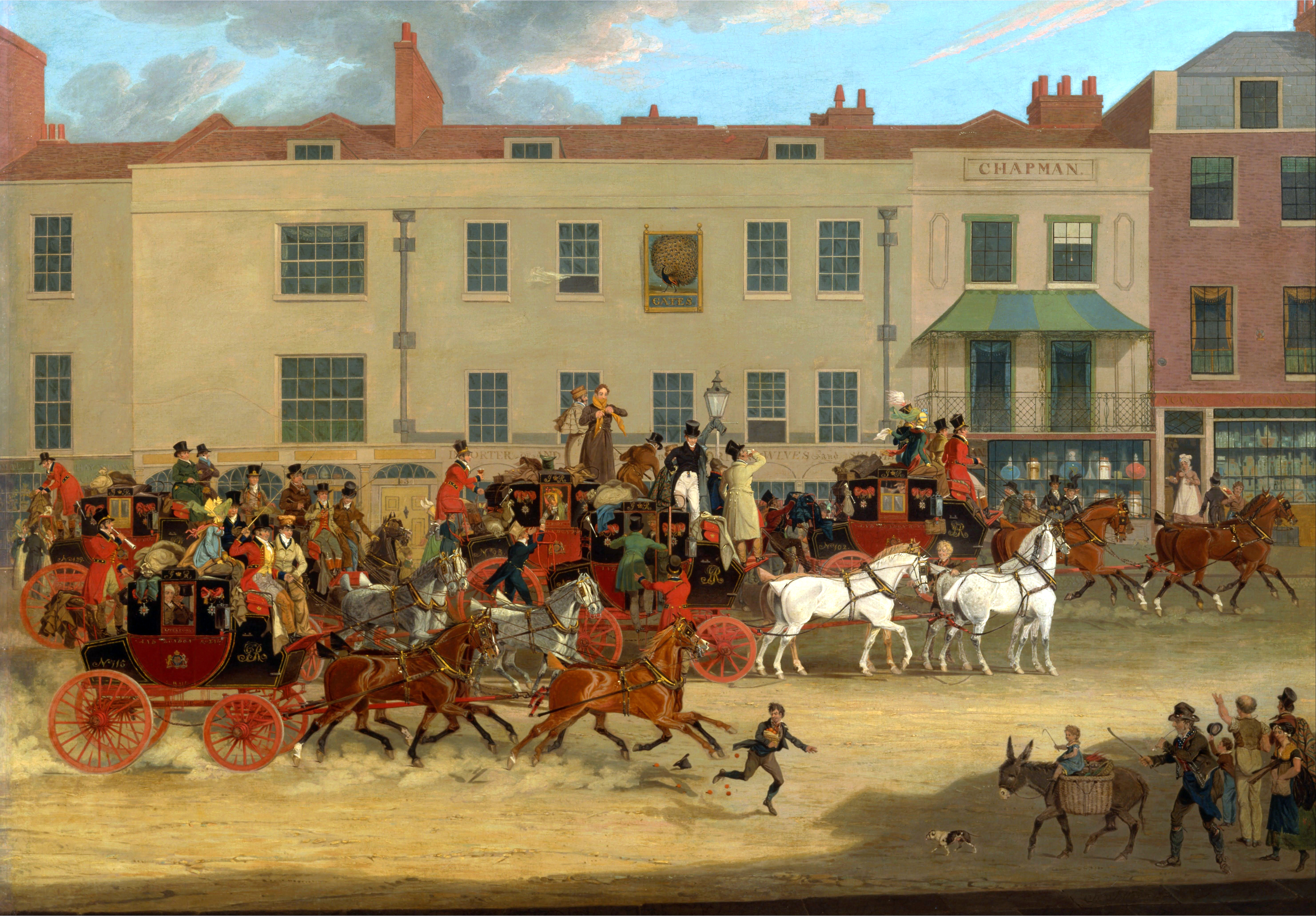
The Peacock Inn by James Pollard, one of several travellers' inns that were on Islington High Street from the 16th to 19th centuries

At the northern end of Goswell Road, the route northwards follows a one-way section to the Angel, turning right into Islington High Street. The southwards route from Islington High Street follows City Road for a short distance before joining Goswell Road via Wakley Street. The earliest reference to Islington High Street is its appearance on a 1590 map of the area. At this time, nine inns (including the Angel, which subsequently gave its name to the area), as well as housing and a public pond were shown lining the street. The Peacock Inn, one of the nine inns, and which operated on Islington High Street from 1564 to 1962, was where Tom of Tom Brown's Schooldays stayed prior to travelling to Rugby School. In 1716, Islington High Street came under the control of the newly formed Islington Turnpike Trust. The Trust grew rapidly and soon had control of most major roads in the area, building a number of major road arteries through the expanding residential areas, including Caledonian Road, Euston Road, City Road and New North Road.

Upper Street, running roughly north from Islington High Street to Highbury Corner, is the main shopping street of Islington, and dates back to at least the 12th century. Livestock herded along the Great North Road for Smithfield Market, would – when passing through what was mainly fields and farmland – pause at lairs built between Upper Street and Liverpool Road by an enterprising farmer, Richard Laycock; Laycock's lairs would be used in 1861 for the site of the Royal Agricultural Hall, and a number of pubs and shops existed along the street to serve farmers and travellers headed for Smithfield. In the 18th century, Upper Street began to develop from an agricultural to a residential area. Ten houses were built in 1768 (later named Hornsey Row), and a further group built immediately south of Hornsey Row in 1792. Liverpool Road, originally called Back Road, was used as an alternative to Upper Street for the Smithfield herders, and both streets have a "high pavement" constructed to protect pedestrians from being splashed by the passing animals; in places, the pavement is approximately 1 m above the road surface.

After reaching the eight-way interchange at Highbury Corner, the A1 turns north-west as Holloway Road. Until the 14th century the route turned off along what is now Hornsey Road – the A103 road – to go through Muswell Hill, but when that became impassable a new route along Holloway Road via Highgate was created in the 14th century. The earliest record giving the name of the road as the Holloway dates from 1307. The main stretch of Holloway Road runs through the site of the villages of Tollington and Stroud. The exact time of their founding is not known, but the earliest record of them dates from 1000. The names ceased to be used by the late 17th century but are still preserved in the local place names "Tollington Park" and "Stroud Green"; since that time, the area has been known as Holloway. The northern point of Holloway Road is the complex interchange at Archway. The construction of the interchange left a few buildings isolated in the centre of the roundabout, including the Archway Tavern, which appears on the cover of the Kinks' 1971 album Muswell Hillbillies.

=== Haringey ===
John Nash's combined Archway and three-arch bridge for Hornsey Lane, 1890s

After the Archway roundabout, the A1 enters a cutting, and becomes Archway Road. This was built in 1810–13 to provide an easier route than that up the 1:11 Highgate Hill. The mining engineer Robert Vazie proposed a route to the East of Highgate, mostly in a cutting but with a 360 yard tunnel through the ridge carrying Hornsey Lane. The St. Mary Islington Road Act 1810 established the Highgate Archway Company to do this, "archway" being a euphemism for "tunnel". Work was plagued by water, with John Rennie called in for advice. On 13 April 1812 the brick-lined tunnel collapsed. John Nash was appointed engineer and oversaw excavation of a cutting for the entire route with a combined "archway" and three-arch bridge above, carrying Hornsey Lane. The entire "archway" lay well below ground level and was referred to in some prints of the 1820s and 1830 as "Highgate Tunnel".

Water continued to be a problem for many years after the road's opening, destroying its surface, which, in accordance with then-current practice had been built over a base of graded stones. Parliamentary Commissioners took over the road and, after many failed attempts, John Macneill, chief engineer to Thomas Telford, solved the problem in 1829 by reconstructing the road over a base of Roman cement and gravel, with extensive drainage at the sides. This is the basis for modern road building and Archway Road was its first use. The construction was financed by tolls which were abolished in 1876 – traffic increased substantially thereafter, particularly after the introduction of trams on the road.

Between 1897 and 1900, Nash's structure was replaced with the present cast-iron Hornsey Lane Bridge, designed by Sir Alexander Binnie, accessible from Archway Road by a steep flight of steps. In 1885 Nash's classical balustrade along Hornsey Lane had been replaced with tall railings to prevent suicides and Binnie's bridge was designed to deter them. In 1972 Binnie's bridge was designated a Grade II listed building by English Heritage but it became known as a suicide spot. It was the venue for the mental illness campaign group Mad Pride's inaugural vigil in 2000, and was the subject of Johnny Burke's 2006 film The Bridge. When, at the end of 2010, three men in three weeks committed suicide by jumping from the bridge, a campaign was set up by local residents for better anti-suicide measures. Ironically the railings erected in 2019 closely resembled those of 1885, differing only in that while the 1885 railings replaced Nash's balustrades, the 2019 ones left Binnie's in place. The bridge marks the boundary between the Inner London Borough of Islington and the Outer London Borough of Haringey.

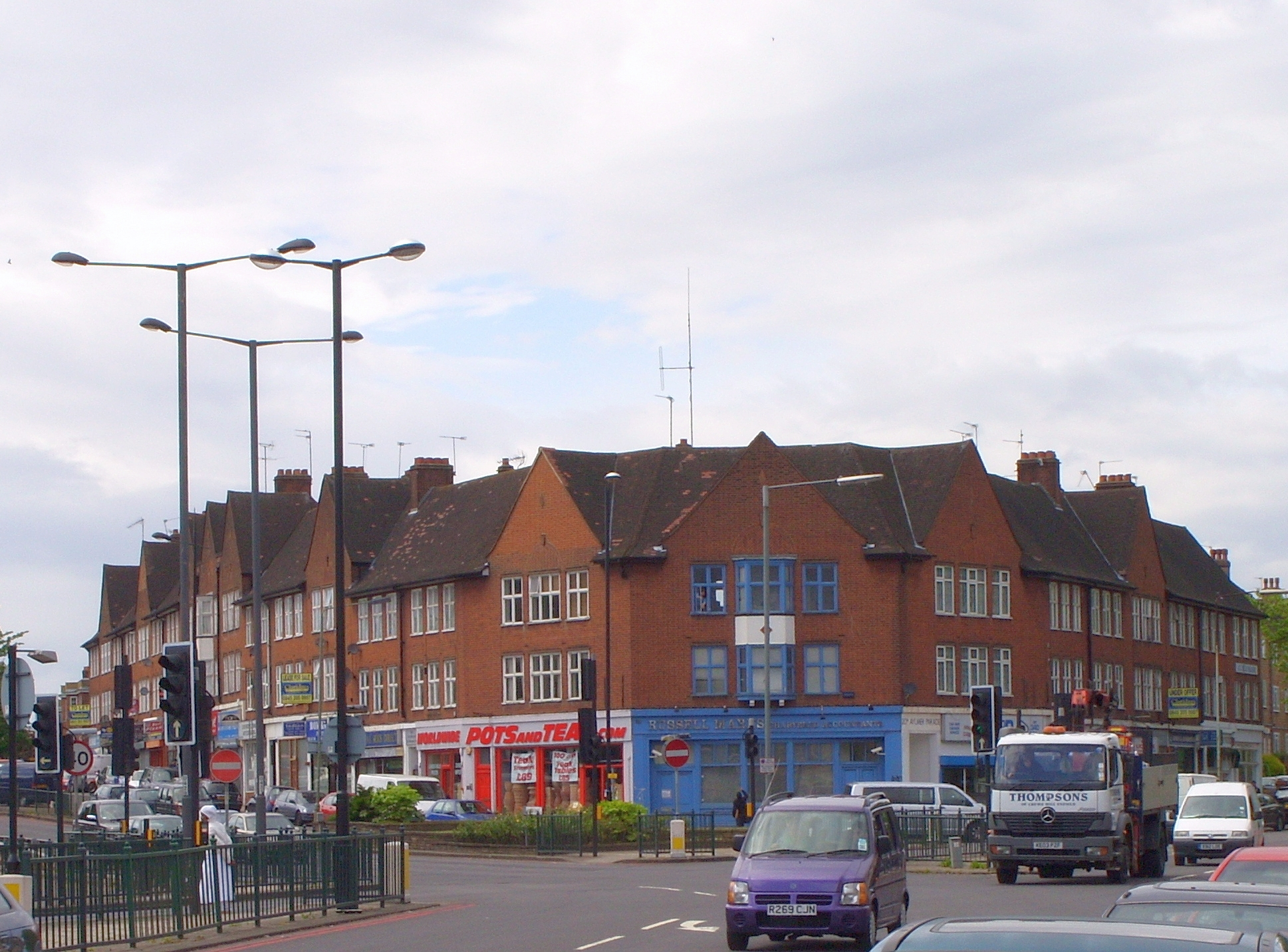
The A1 (Aylmer Road, left) diverging away from the original Great North Road (right)

An inquiry was held into widening the section from the Archway intersection to the Hornsey Lane Bridge to a three lane dual carriageway in 1969 and work started in 1971. It was originally intended to widen a further section of the road, but severe disruption led to the first inquiry being abandoned in 1978, and a second inquiry in 1984, chaired by Air Marshal Sir Michael Giddings, was also abandoned. The traffic flow was projected to increase to 180,000 cars a day by 1981, but by 1986 the actual flow was only 30,000 a day.

When originally constructed, Archway Road went through countryside with few buildings – though by 1828 the Woodman pub at the junction with Muswell Hill Road, and the now demolished Wellington pub at the junction with North Hill provided refreshments to travellers; however, with the coming of the railways in 1867 ribbon development started along the road, including the Camra Heritage listed Winchester Tavern with the distinctive attached parade of shops and house with deep arched eaves built by the Imperial Property Investment Co in 1881. At the northern end of Archway Road, the road re-intersects with the traditional Great North Road route (at this point called North Hill) via Bakers Lane. The roads almost immediately re-diverge, with the Great North Road route heading north as the A1000 towards Finchley, Whetstone and Barnet and the A1 heading west as Aylmer Road.

Aylmer Road is a very short stretch of road, running west for less than half a mile between the junction with the A1000 in Haringey to the junction with The Bishops Avenue in Barnet. The southern side of the road is partly taken up by Highgate Golf Course, while the northern side is a mixture of small shops, flats and allotments. The road is named after Sir Fenton Aylmer, who received the Victoria Cross for his part in the assault on Nilt Fort on 2 December 1891.

=== Barnet ===
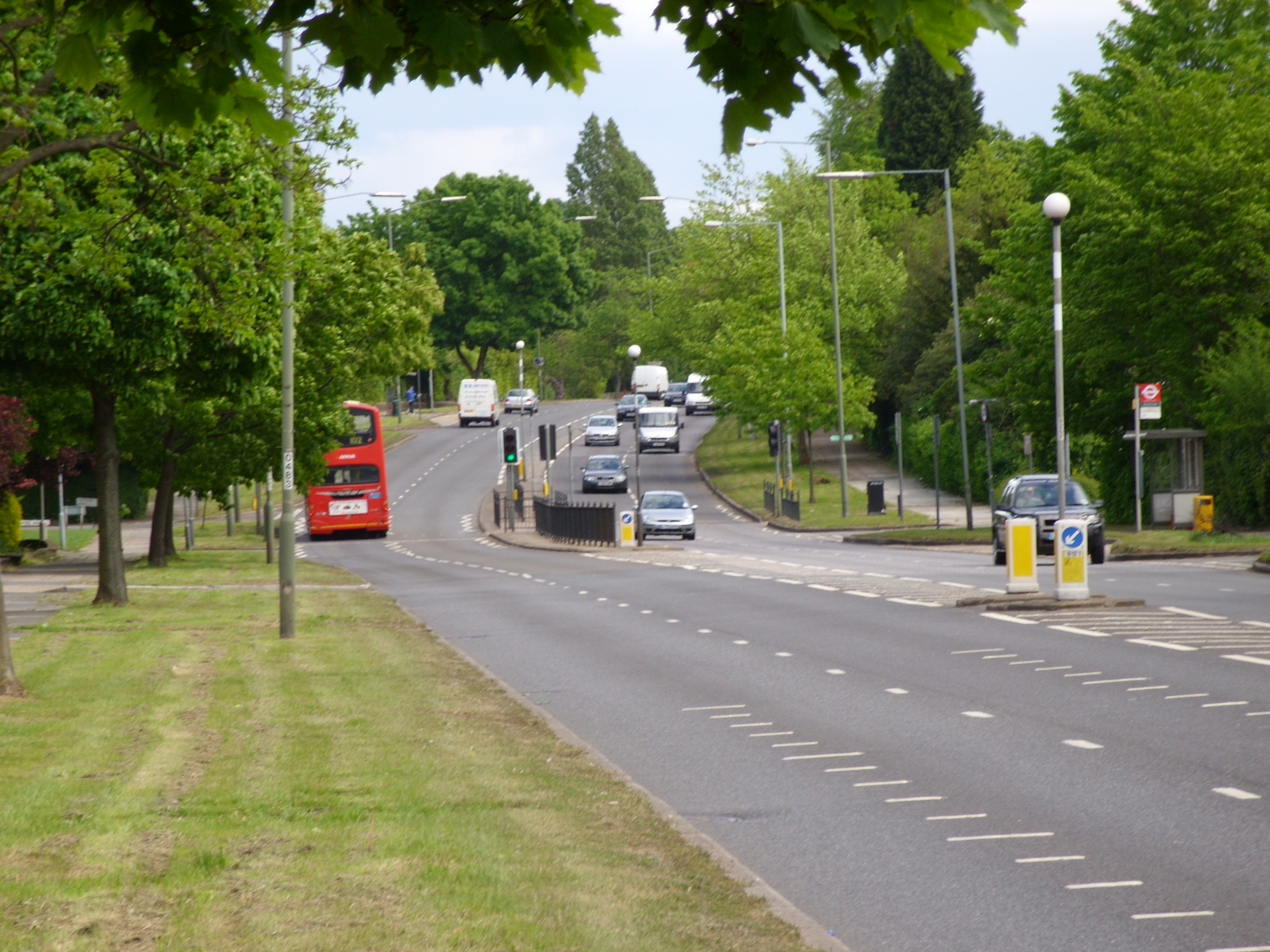
View west along Lyttleton Road

After crossing The Bishops Avenue, the A1 becomes Lyttelton Road, which was laid out in 1931 as part of the residential development of the area, and runs east–west along the northern foot of Highgate Hill between Hampstead Garden Suburb and East Finchley. It is for the most part residential; on the northern side stands the Belvedere Court block of flats. Built with the road in the 1930s, the building is now Grade II Listed as an example of 1930s architecture.

After passing playing fields to the south, the A1 briefly becomes Market Place, a former street market that has evolved into a short stretch of shops, then becomes Falloden Way – built between 1914 and 1924 as part of a programme of planned extensions to Hampstead Garden Suburb, and runs on an embankment due to a dip in the ground caused by Mutton Brook, a tributary of the River Brent, which runs parallel to the road for its entire length, mostly along the south side. The north side of the road is occupied by 1930s housing blocks, whilst the southern side is occupied by a narrow strip of parkland following the brook, and by the northern tip of Big Wood and Little Wood – two of the few surviving remnants of the ancient woodland that once covered what is now north London.

The A1 merges with the North Circular Road (A406) and the two routes run briefly together, crossing over the Henlys Corner interchange. Henlys Corner is a junction with the 1820s turnpike road, Finchley Road, which was built to provide a by-pass to the route north from London through Hampstead; the name changes to Regents Park Road on the northern, Finchley, side of the junction. The junction had an £8 million upgrade completed in January 2012, which included Britain's first "hands-free" pedestrian crossing to allow Orthodox Jews to reach the nearby Finchley Synagogue, one of Europe's largest, without operating machinery on the Sabbath. While a synagogue has stood on the site since 1935, the current building dates from 1967.

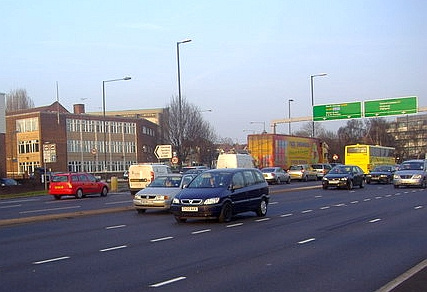
Henlys Corner, where the A1 meets the A406. This junction was modified in 2011 to provide extra filter lanes.

After the Henlys Corner interchange, the routes diverge, with the A406 going south to Brent Cross, while the A1 turns north-west as Great North Way through the leafy suburbs of Mill Hill and Hendon. Great North Way, built in 1926, joins Watford Way carrying the A41, completed in 1927, at Fiveways Corner, and in 1970 a junction with the M1 motorway was created. The A41 and A1 continue together as Watford Way via Mill Hill Circus to Apex Corner, where they separate, with the A41 turning west, and the A1 turning to run straight north. After passing Apex Corner, the A1 runs north and out of London as the dual carriageway Barnet Way (or Barnet Bypass). This dual carriageway was part of a 1920–24 road improvement programme that was mentioned in parliament in 1928 as hopefully being completed by the end of that summer.

The northbound carriageway passes the entrance to Scratchwood, an area of ancient forest which is now a local nature reserve, then crosses the A411 from Watford to Barnet at the Stirling Corner roundabout. A 0.6 miles (0.97 km) proposed link road at this roundabout, estimated at £22.8 million in 1987, would have provided access to the M1, but the plans were subsequently abandoned. The link had been planned during discussions for the Hendon Urban Motorway, which was intended to carry the M1 all the way down to Hyde Park Corner as part of the London Ringways scheme; the interchange would have been junction 3 on the motorway; which is currently the unnumbered junction for London Gateway services.

Past Stirling Corner, the A1 skirts Borehamwood, before turning northeast and running through open countryside to Bignell's Corner. At Bignell's Corner the A1 crosses under the M25 motorway at a large roundabout near South Mimms services. North of Bignell's Corner the A1 becomes the A1(M) motorway for a while, and follows the Great North Road route, running north to Edinburgh.

== Construction ==
The A1 route was designated in 1921 by the Ministry of Transport under the Great Britain road numbering scheme. Through the inner boroughs of the City, Islington, and Haringey it uses existing roads and streets; when it reaches what is now the outer London borough of Barnet, some stretches of purpose-built new roads were built, and others have been widened and made into dual carriageways. In 1828, John Benjamin Macneill, chief engineer to Thomas Telford, used Roman cement and gravel to solve problems with wear and tear on the Archway Road section of what is now the A1, an innovative technique that was used there for the first time, and is the basis for modern road building.
