= List of highways numbered 100 =

Several highways are numbered 100:

== Australia ==
- Great Ocean Road, Victoria
- Surf Coast Highway, Victoria
- Flinders Highway, South Australia
- Lincoln Highway, South Australia

== Canada ==
- Alberta Highway 100 (Sherwood Park Freeway) (unsigned)
- Manitoba Highway 100 (Perimeter Highway)
- New Brunswick Route 100
- Newfoundland and Labrador Route 100
- Niagara Regional Road 100, Ontario
- former Highway 100 (Ontario)

== Costa Rica ==
- National Route 100

== Croatia ==
- D100 road

== Germany ==
- Bundesautobahn 100, the Berliner Stadtring (Berlin City Ring Road)
- Bundesstraße 100

== India ==
- National Highway 100 (former, now National Highway 522 (India))

== Korea, South ==
- Seoul Ring Expressway

== Malaysia ==
- A100 Jalan Gula, Perak State Route A100, a road in Perak
- FT 100 Federal Route 100 (Lumut Bypass), a highway bypass in Manjung district, Perak

== Mexico ==
- Mexico Federal Highway 100
- Jalisco State Highway 100
- Sonora State Highway 100

== Netherlands ==
- Stadsroute 100 (Amsterdam), the city center ring road

== Nigeria ==
- F100 highway (Nigeria)

== Philippines ==
- N100 highway (Philippines)

== Poland ==
- Voivodeship road 100 (Poland) in the Pomeranian Voivodeship

== Serbia ==
- State Road 100 (Serbia), an IIA-class road connecting Horgoš with Batajnica.

== Turkey ==
- D.100State road D.100 (Turkey), a west–east state road running from the Bulgarian border to Iranian border.

== United Kingdom ==
- A100 road, part of the London Inner Ring Road
- B100 road

== United States ==
- Alabama State Route 100
  - County Route 100 (Lee County, Alabama)
- Arkansas Highway 100
- California State Route 100
- Colorado State Highway 100
- Connecticut Route 100
- Delaware Route 100
- Florida State Road 100
- Georgia State Route 100
- Illinois Route 100
- Indiana State Road 100 (former)
- Iowa Highway 100
- K-100 (Kansas highway) (former)
- Kentucky Route 100
- Louisiana Highway 100
- Maine State Route 100
- Maryland Route 100
  - Maryland Route 100 (1930s-1950s)
  - Maryland Route 100 (former)
  - Maryland Route 100J
  - Maryland Route 100L
  - Maryland Route 100M
  - Maryland Route 100N
  - Maryland Route 100O
  - Maryland Route 100P
  - Maryland Route 100Q
  - Maryland Route 100R
  - Maryland Route 100S
  - Maryland Route 100T
  - Maryland Route 100U
  - Maryland Route 100V
  - Maryland Route 100W
  - Maryland Route 100X
- M-100 (Michigan highway)
- Minnesota State Highway 100
- Missouri Route 100
- Nebraska Highway 100 (former)
- New Jersey Route 100 (former)
  - County Route 100 (Bergen County, New Jersey)
- New York State Route 100
  - County Route 100 (Cortland County, New York)
  - County Route 100 (Dutchess County, New York)
  - County Route 100 (Rockland County, New York)
  - County Route 100 (Suffolk County, New York)
  - County Route 100 (Wayne County, New York)
- North Carolina Highway 100
- Ohio State Route 100
- Oklahoma State Highway 100
- Pennsylvania Route 100
- Rhode Island Route 100
- South Dakota Highway 100 (proposed)
- Tennessee State Route 100
- Texas State Highway 100
  - Texas State Highway Spur 100
  - Farm to Market Road 100
  - Texas Park Road 100
- Utah State Route 100
- Vermont Route 100
- Virginia State Route 100
- Washington State Route 100
- West Virginia Route 100
- Wisconsin Highway 100

Territories

- Puerto Rico Highway 100

== See also ==
- List of highways numbered 100A
- List of highways numbered 100B
- List of highways numbered 100C
- A100

Preceded by 99	Lists of highways 100	Succeeded by 101
