= Vandurai Nathar Temple =

Temple in India

Religion
- Affiliation: Hinduism
- District: Tiruvarur
- Deity: Lord Shiva

Location
- Location: Cherivadi Vaikal in the Tiruvarur district
- State: Tamil Nadu
- Country: India
- Interactive map of Vandurai Nathar Temple

Vandurai Nathar Temple is a Hindu temple located at Cherivadi Vaikal in the Tiruvarur district of Tamil Nadu, India. The presiding deity is Shiva.

== Paadal Petra Sthalam ==
It is one of the shrines of the 275 Paadal Petra Sthalams - Shiva Sthalams glorified in the early medieval Tevaram. The consort of the presiding deity, Parvati, is known as Vel Nedunganni. The historical name of the place is Tiruventhurai.

== Legend ==
According to Hindu mythology, the sage Brungi worshipped Shiva at this place. When Shiva's consort Parvati angry with Brungi for not having given importance to her, cursed him and tried to stall his worship, Brungi took the form of a bee (vandu) and entered the ear of Shiva's idol.

== Significance ==
There are shrines to Ganesha, Murugan, Ardhanarisvara, Brahma, Bhairava, Surya, Chandra and Shani within the temple complex. Hymns in praise of the temple have been composed by the Saivite saint Sambandar in his Thevaram.
