= Thiru Payatrunathar Temple =

Thiru Payatrunathar Temple Sri Thiruppayatranathar Temple
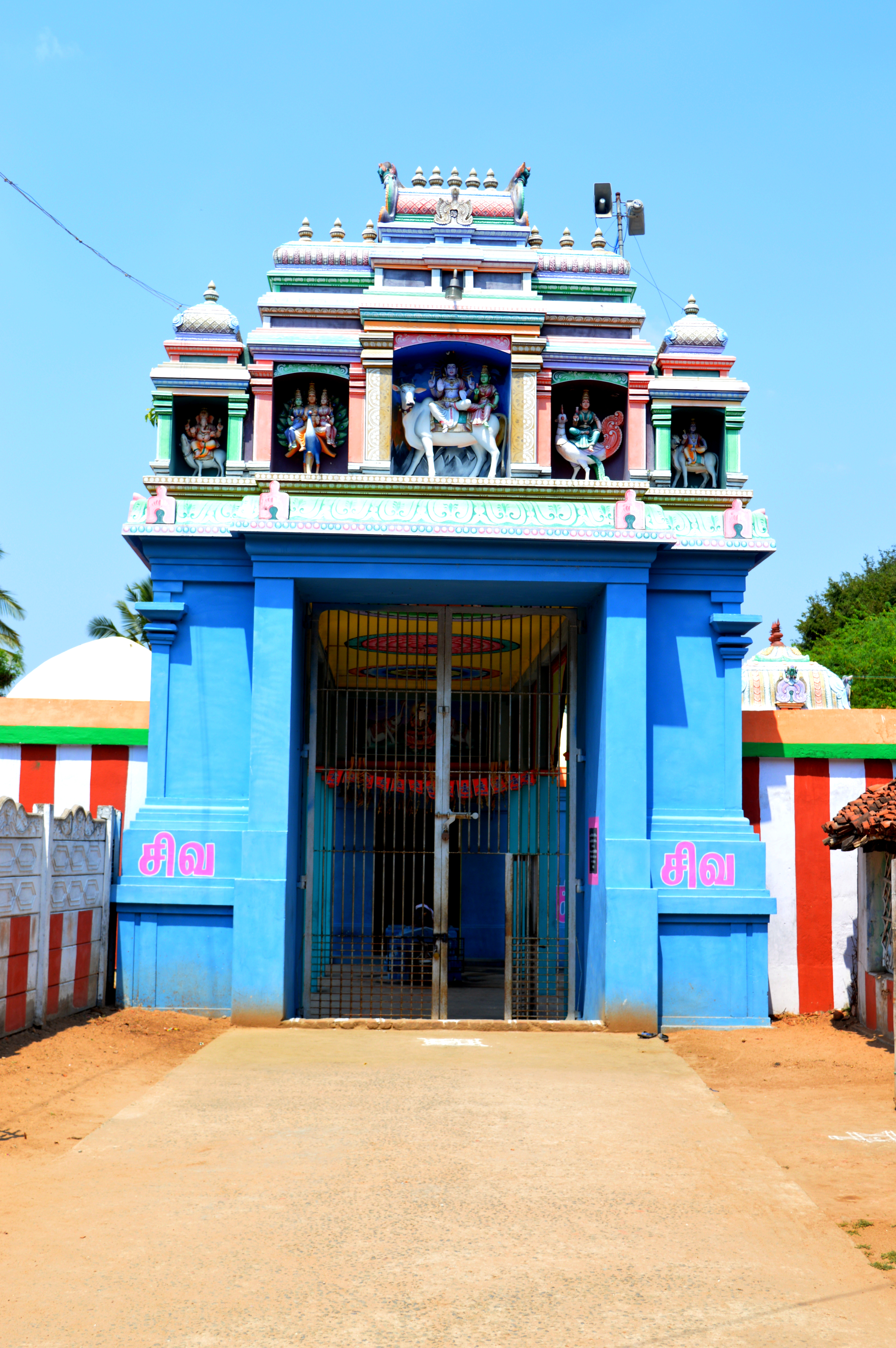
- Sri Thiruppayatranathar Temple, Thiruppayathangudi - March 2018

Thiru Payatrunathar Temple is a Hindu temple located at Thiru Payathangudi in the Nagapattinam district of the Indian state of Tamil Nadu. The temple is dedicated to Shiva.

== Etymology ==
The presiding deity is known a Thiru Payatrunathar which mean "Lord of the pulses" in Tamil. He is also known as Muktapureeswarar.

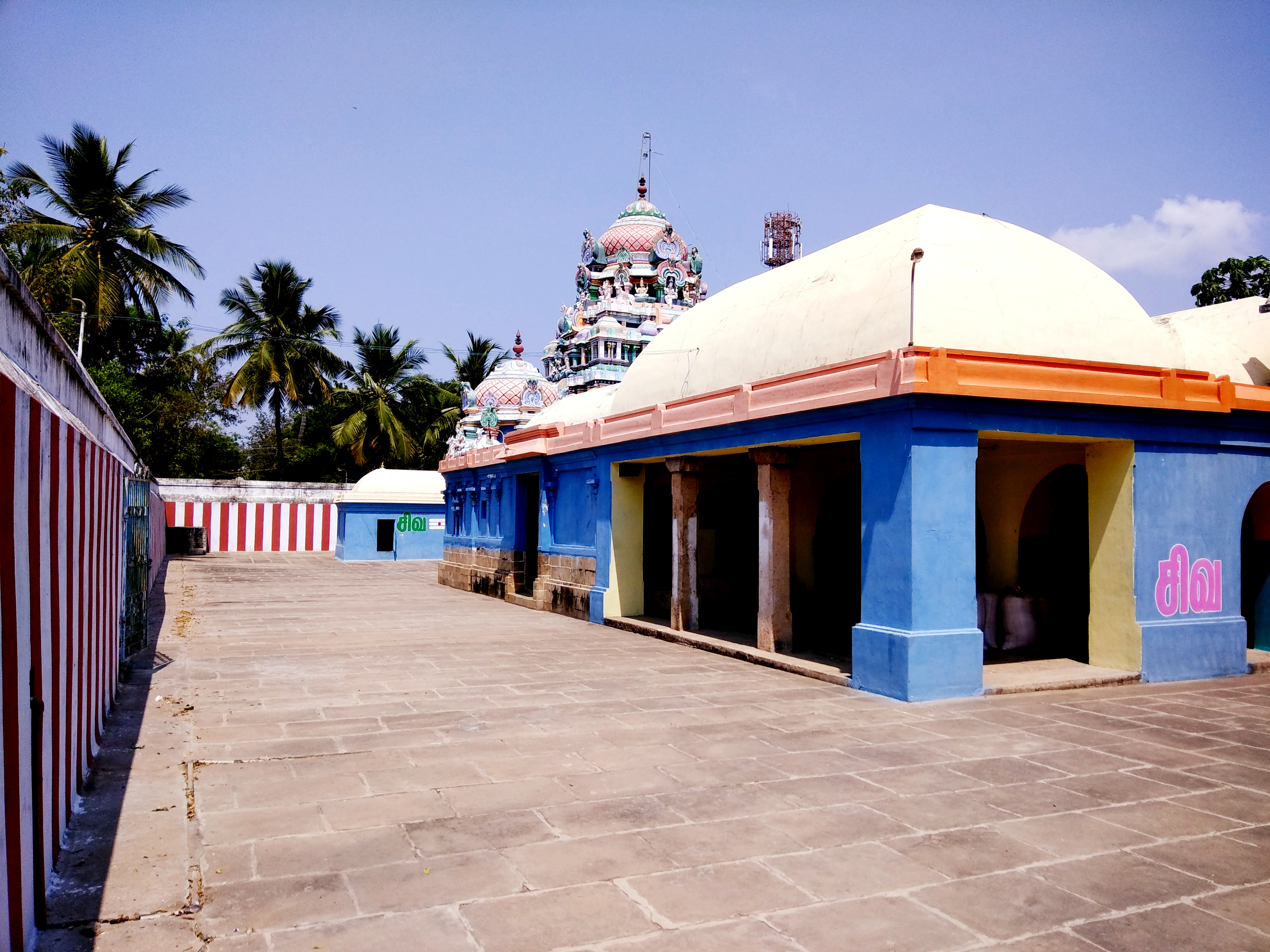
Inside Thiru Payatrunathar Temple

== Legend ==
According to popular legend, a spice trader, on arrival at the place, got to know that there was no duty on pulses but there was a duty on pepper. As a result, he prayed to Shiva to convert the bags of pepper he was carrying, to pulses. His prayers were answered when the pepper actually changed to pulses and he was not required to pay any duty. The trader spent his money in building temples for Shiva and propagating Saivism.

== Significance ==
Bhairava is believed to have worshipped Shiva at the Thiru Payatrunathar temple. Hymns in praise of the temple have been composed by the saint Appar in the Thevaram.
