= SH101 =

SH101 can refer to

- A number of state highways in the United States
- Roland SH-101, a synthesizer
