= R101 (disambiguation) =

The R101 was a British airship which crashed in 1930.

R101 may also refer to:

- R101 (Italy), a radio station
- R101 (South Africa), a road
- NOAAS Oceanographer (R 101), a US oceanographic research vessel
- R101 railway (Croatia), a railway line in Croatia

== See also ==
- R101 road (disambiguation)
