= San Juan District, Tibás =

District in Tibás canton, San José province, Costa Rica

San Juan
- District
- San Juan district
- San Juan district location in Costa Rica
- Coordinates: 9.9609348°N 84.0730993°W
- Country: Costa Rica
- Province: San José
- Canton: Tibás

Area
  - Total: 3.56 km^{2} (1.37 sq mi)
- Elevation: 1,162 m (3,812 ft)

Population (2011)
  - Total: 21,745
  - Density: 6,110/km^{2} (15,800/sq mi)
- Time zone: UTC−06:00
- Postal code: 11301

San Juan is a district of the Tibás canton, in the San José province of Costa Rica.

== Geography ==
San Juan has an area of 3.56 km^{2} and an elevation of 1,162 metres.

== Demographics ==
Historical population
Census	Pop.	±% p.a.
1864	1,704	—
1883	1,905	+0.59%
1892	2,297	+2.10%
1927	2,356	+0.07%
1950	5,621	+3.85%
1963	10,838	+5.18%
1973	18,670	+5.59%
1984	22,415	+1.68%
2000	24,944	+0.67%
2011	21,745	−1.24%
2022	25,978	+1.63%
Source: Instituto Nacional de Estadística y Censos; Centro Centroamericano de Población

For the 2011 census, San Juan had a population of 21,745 inhabitants.

== Transportation ==
=== Road transportation ===
The district is covered by the following road routes:

- National Route 5
- National Route 32
- National Route 39
- National Route 101
- National Route 102
- National Route 117

=== Rail transportation ===
The Interurbano Line operated by Incofer is part of the border of this district with Colima district in the same canton.
