= Tiruneelakkudi Neelakandeswarar Temple =

Shiva temple in Tamil Nadu, India

Coordinates: 10.985399°N 79.481691°E

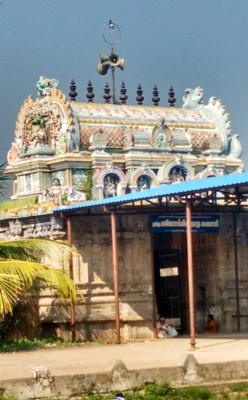
The temple entrance

Tiruneelakkudi Neelakandeswarar Temple is a Hindu temple located at Thanjavur district of Tamil Nadu, India. The historical name of Tiruneelakkudi is Thennalakudi . The presiding deity is Shiva. He is called as Neelakandeswarar. His consort is Oppilamulaiyal.

== Significance ==
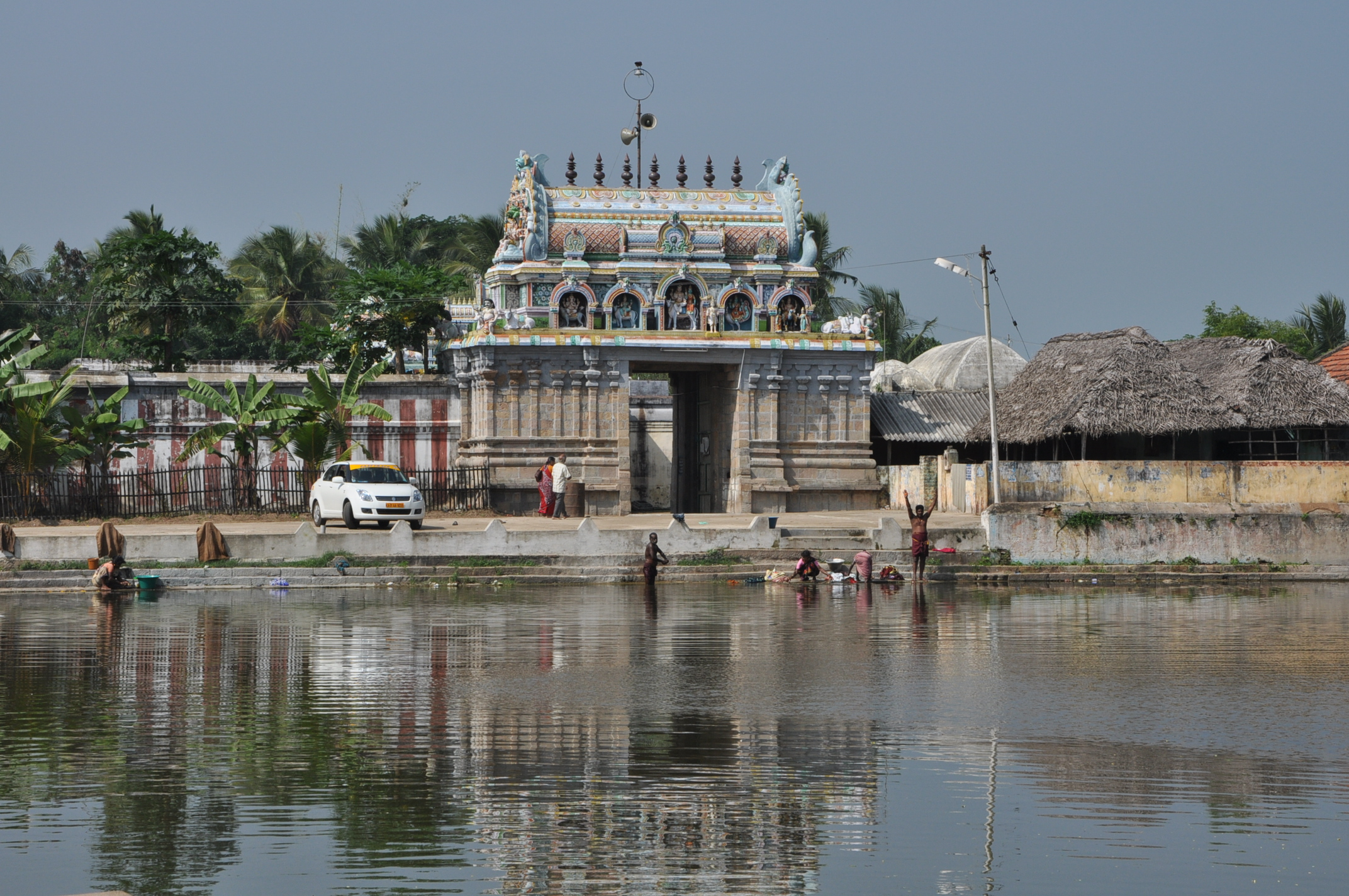

It is one of the shrines of the 275 Paadal Petra Sthalams - Shiva Sthalams glorified in the early medieval Tevaram poems by Tamil Saivite Nayanar Tirunavukkarasar. Praises of the temple have been sung by Sambandar in the Thevaram. The temple is also associated with the life of Thiruneelakanta Nayanar.

== Legend ==
As per Hindu legend, when the celestial deities Devas and demons Asuras were churning the Ocean of Milk for ambrosia, poison emerged first. Shiva consumed the poison, but his wife Parvati held his throat as he was consuming it. It is believed that Shiva got the name Neelakanta from then on. Parvati anointed Shiva with oil in this place to relieve Neelankata of his pain. The practise of anointing the lingam in the temple continues in modern times where the whole oil is consumed by the image.

The lingam in the front hall of the central shrine is believed to have been worshipped by Brahma, the Hindu god of creation, to relieve him of the sins committed while coalescing with celestial dancer Urvasi.

Markendeya is believed to have worshipped the deity by carrying him in palanquin to attain long life. The Saptastanam festival is celebrated commemorating the event when the festival images of the seven neighbouring temples are brought to this temple. During the festival, the festive images of all the temples are carried around the streets of Tiruneelakudi.

Kamadenu, the holy cow that emerged from churning the Ocean of Milk, is believed to have worshipped Neelakantar in this place to relieve itself of its curse from her master sage Vashista. Sage Durvasa, Devas and other sages have worshipped the presiding deity here. The temple is counted as one of the temples built on the banks of River Kaveri.

== Architecture ==
The image of lingam is about 2 ft (0.61 m) high and has an unusual square projections and a rough surface. The ablution performed during the Chittirai festival with gingely oil is absorbed by the image.

The Saiva saint Appar is believed to have worshipped and sung praises of the deity here while he was going to Thyagarajaswamy Temple, Tiruvarur. He describes the tortures he faced from his Jain counterparts.

== Gallery ==
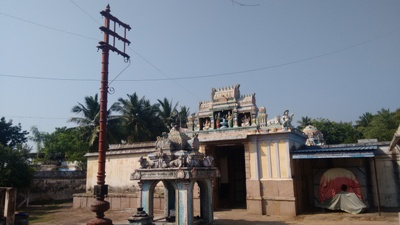
Flagpost, Balipeedam

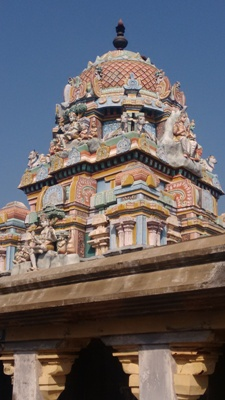
Vimana of presiding deity

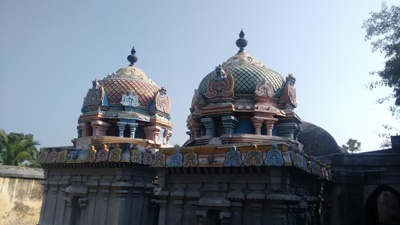
Vimanas of goddesses

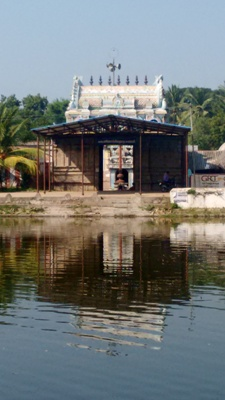
Tank in front of the temple
