= A103 =

A103, A.103, A 103 or A-103 may refer to:

- A103 road (England), a road in London connecting Lower Holloway to Hornsey
- A 103 motorway (Germany), a German autobahn
- AS-103, a 1965 spaceflight in the Apollo program
- Agusta A.103, a 1959 Italian prototype single-seat light helicopter
- RFA Bacchus (A103), a 1936 Royal Fleet Auxiliary stores freighter and distilling ship
