= León XIII =

District in Tibás canton, San José province, Costa Rica

- District
- Interactive map of León XIII
- León XIII district location in Costa Rica
- Coordinates: 9°57′37″N 84°06′03″W
- Country: Costa Rica
- Province: San José
- Canton: Tibás
- Creation: 14 March 1994

Area
  - Total: 0.78 km^{2} (0.30 sq mi)
- Elevation: 1,094 m (3,589 ft)

Population (2011)
  - Total: 13,661
  - Density: 18,000/km^{2} (45,000/sq mi)
- Time zone: UTC−06:00
- Postal code: 11304

León XIII is a district of the Tibás canton, in the San José province of Costa Rica.

== History ==
León XIII was created on 14 March 1994 by Ley 7377.

== Geography ==
León XIII has an area of 0.78 km^{2} and an elevation of 1,094 metres.

== Demographics ==
Historical population
Census	Pop.	±% p.a.
2000	16,400	—
2011	13,661	−1.65%
2022	17,219	+2.13%
Source: Instituto Nacional de Estadística y Censos; Centro Centroamericano de Población

For the 2011 census, León XIII had a population of 13,661 inhabitants.

== Transportation ==
=== Road transportation ===
The district is covered by the following road routes:

- National Route 39
