= A101 =

A101, A.101 or A-101 may refer to:

- A101 road (England) or Rotherhithe Tunnel, road tunnel crossing beneath the River Thames in East London
- Russian route A130, formerly A101, road from Moscow to the border of Belarus through Roslavl
- AS-101, the first Saturn rocket launch to carry a Boilerplate Apollo spacecraft in 1964
- Aero A.101, a 1930s Czechoslovak biplane light bomber and reconnaissance aircraft
- Agusta A.101, a 1964 Italian large prototype transport helicopter
- A101 (company), a Turkish chain market
