= List of highways numbered 100B =

The following highways are numbered 100B:

== United States ==
- County Road 100B (Clay County, Florida)
- New York State Route 100B
- Vermont Route 100B

== See also ==
- List of highways numbered 100
