= Anselmo Llorente =

District in Tibás canton, San José province, Costa Rica

- District
- Interactive map of Anselmo Llorente
- Anselmo Llorente district location in Costa Rica
- Coordinates: 9.9560271°N 84.0698056°W
- Country: Costa Rica
- Province: San José
- Canton: Tibás
- Creation: 8 January 1953

Area
  - Total: 1.36 km^{2} (0.53 sq mi)
- Elevation: 1,155 m (3,789 ft)

Population (2011)
  - Total: 9,986
  - Density: 7,340/km^{2} (19,000/sq mi)
- Time zone: UTC−06:00
- Postal code: 11303

Anselmo Llorente is a district of the Tibás canton, in the San José province of Costa Rica.

== History ==
Anselmo Llorente was created on 8 January 1953 by Decreto Ejecutivo 1.

== Geography ==
Anselmo Llorente has an area of 1.36 km^{2} and an elevation of 1,155 metres.

== Demographics ==
Historical population
Census	Pop.	±% p.a.
1963	2,484	—
1973	3,547	+3.63%
1984	8,138	+7.84%
2000	10,103	+1.36%
2011	9,986	−0.11%
2022	10,521	+0.48%
Source: Instituto Nacional de Estadística y Censos; Centro Centroamericano de Población

For the 2011 census, Anselmo Llorente had a population of 9,986 inhabitants.

== Transportation ==
=== Road transportation ===
The district is covered by the following road routes:

- National Route 32
- National Route 39
- National Route 101
- National Route 102
- National Route 117
