= List of highways numbered 100C =

The following highways are numbered 100C:

== United States ==
- New York State Route 100C
- Vermont Route 100C

== See also ==
- List of highways numbered 100
