= Colima District =

District in Tibás canton, San José province, Costa Rica

Colima
- District
- Interactive map of Colima
- Colima district location in Costa Rica
- Coordinates: 9.9571165°N 84.0897985°W
- Country: Costa Rica
- Province: San José
- Canton: Tibás
- Creation: 17 August 1999

Area
  - Total: 2 km^{2} (0.77 sq mi)
- Elevation: 1,130 m (3,710 ft)

Population (2011)
  - Total: 13,525
  - Density: 6,800/km^{2} (18,000/sq mi)
- Time zone: UTC−06:00
- Postal code: 11305

Colima is a district of the Tibás canton, in the San José province of Costa Rica.

== History ==
Colima was created on 17 August 1999 by Decreto Ejecutivo 28109-G.

== Geography ==
Colima has an area of 2 km^{2} and an elevation of 1,130 metres.

== Demographics ==
Historical population
Census	Pop.	±% p.a.
2000	14,248	—
2011	13,525	−0.47%
2022	15,347	+1.16%
Source: Instituto Nacional de Estadística y Censos; Centro Centroamericano de Población

For the 2011 census, Colima had a population of 13,525 inhabitants.

== Transportation ==
=== Road transportation ===
The district is covered by the following road routes:

- National Route 39
- National Route 101

=== Rail transportation ===
The Interurbano Line operated by Incofer goes through this district.
