= National Route 101 (Costa Rica) =

National Road Route in Costa Rica

National Secondary Route 101
- Ruta nacional secundaria 101

Route information
- Maintained by Ministry of Public Works and Transport
- Length: 4.270 km (2.653 mi)

Location
- Country: Costa Rica
- Provinces: San José

Highway system
- National Road Network of Costa Rica
← Route 100	→ Route 102

National Secondary Route 101, or just Route 101 (Spanish: Ruta Nacional Secundaria 101, or Ruta 101) is a National Road Route of Costa Rica, located in the San José province.

== Description ==
In San José province the route covers San José canton (Uruca district), Tibás canton (San Juan, Cinco Esquinas, Anselmo Llorente, Colima districts).
