= List of highways numbered 100A =

The following highways are numbered 100A:

== United States ==
- County Road 100A (Bradford County, Florida)
  - County Road 100A (Columbia County, Florida)
  - County Road 100A (Union County, Florida)
- Maine State Route 100A
- New York State Route 100A
- Vermont Route 100A
