= National Route 102 (Costa Rica) =

National Road Route in Costa Rica

National Secondary Route 102
- Ruta nacional secundaria 102

Route information
- Maintained by Ministry of Public Works and Transport
- Length: 8.145 km (5.061 mi)

Location
- Country: Costa Rica
- Provinces: San José

Highway system
- National Road Network of Costa Rica
← Route 101	→ Route 103

National Secondary Route 102, or just Route 102 (Spanish: Ruta Nacional Secundaria 102, or Ruta 102) is a National Road Route of Costa Rica, located in the San José province.

== Description ==
In San José province the route covers Vázquez de Coronado canton (San Isidro, Patalillo districts), Tibás canton (San Juan, Anselmo Llorente districts), Moravia canton (San Vicente district).
