= Lower Holloway =

Coordinates: 51.550151°N 0.118039°W

- Location within Greater London
- London borough: Islington
- Ceremonial county: Greater London
- Region: London
- Country: England
- Sovereign state: United Kingdom
- Post town: LONDON
- Postcode district: N7
- Dialling code: 020
- Police: Metropolitan
- Fire: London
- Ambulance: London
- UK Parliament: Islington South & Finsbury / Islington North
- London Assembly: North East

A map showing the Lower Holloway ward of Islington Metropolitan Borough as it appeared in 1916.

Lower Holloway is a district in the London Borough of Islington, London. The name has fallen out of common use and the area is now generally regarded as being a part of Holloway. The area of Lower Holloway stretches from the South of Holloway Road to the Central side of Holloway, Nags Head. It is wholly in the N7 postal district.
