= Cinco Esquinas =

District in Tibás canton, San José province, Costa Rica

- District
- Interactive map of Cinco Esquinas
- Cinco Esquinas district location in Costa Rica
- Coordinates: 9.9467372°N 84.0831462°W
- Country: Costa Rica
- Province: San José
- Canton: Tibás

Area
  - Total: 0.67 km^{2} (0.26 sq mi)
- Elevation: 1,158 m (3,799 ft)

Population (2011)
  - Total: 5,925
  - Density: 8,800/km^{2} (23,000/sq mi)
- Time zone: UTC−06:00
- Postal code: 11302

Cinco Esquinas is a district of the Tibás canton, in the San José province of Costa Rica.

== Geography ==
Cinco Esquinas has an area of 0.67 km^{2} and an elevation of 1,158 metres.

== Demographics ==
Historical population
Census	Pop.	±% p.a.
1927	2,223	—
1950	4,973	+3.56%
1963	10,624	+6.01%
1973	13,385	+2.34%
1984	27,140	+6.64%
2000	6,379	−8.65%
2011	5,925	−0.67%
2022	5,527	−0.63%
Source: Instituto Nacional de Estadística y Censos; Centro Centroamericano de Población

For the 2011 census, Cinco Esquinas had a population of 5,925 inhabitants.

== Transportation ==
=== Road transportation ===
The district is covered by the following road routes:

- National Route 5
- National Route 100
- National Route 101
- National Route 108
