= A100 =

A100, A.100 or A-100 may refer to:

== Technology ==
- Intel A100, one branding of the ultra low-power mobile Stealey processor by Intel
- DSLR-A100 or Sony α100, Sony's first digital SLR camera with A-mount
- Nvidia A100, a GPU
- Sony NW-A100, a Walkman A Series digital audio player
- Doepfer A-100, a German synthesizer

== Transportation and military ==
- A-100 class, the colloquial name given to the introductory/orientation training class for incoming US Foreign Service Officers
- A-100 (multiple rocket launcher), a 10 tube multiple rocket launcher used by the People's Liberation Army of China
- A100 road (England), a part of the London Inner Ring Road
- A100 road (Malaysia), a road in Malaysia
- A-100 (rocket), the artillery for the Chinese A-100 multiple rocket launcher
- Aero A.100, a 1933 Czechoslovak biplane light bomber and reconnaissance aircraft
- Astra A-100, a 1990 Spanish double-action/single-action semi-automatic pistol
- Beriev A-100, an airborne early warning and control aircraft under development for the Russian Air Force
- Bundesautobahn 100, a road in Germany
- Dodge A100, a Dodge van
