= Ohio State Route 102 =

State Route 102

Route information
- Maintained by ODOT

Location
- Country: United States
- State: Ohio

Highway system
- Ohio State Highway System; Interstate; US; State; Scenic
← SR 101	→ SR 103

In Ohio, State Route 102 may refer to:

- Ohio State Route 102 (1923), now SR 51
- Ohio State Route 102 (1940s), now SR 120
