= Peacock Inn, Islington =

Former public house in Islington, London

Coordinates: 51.5324°N 0.1065°W

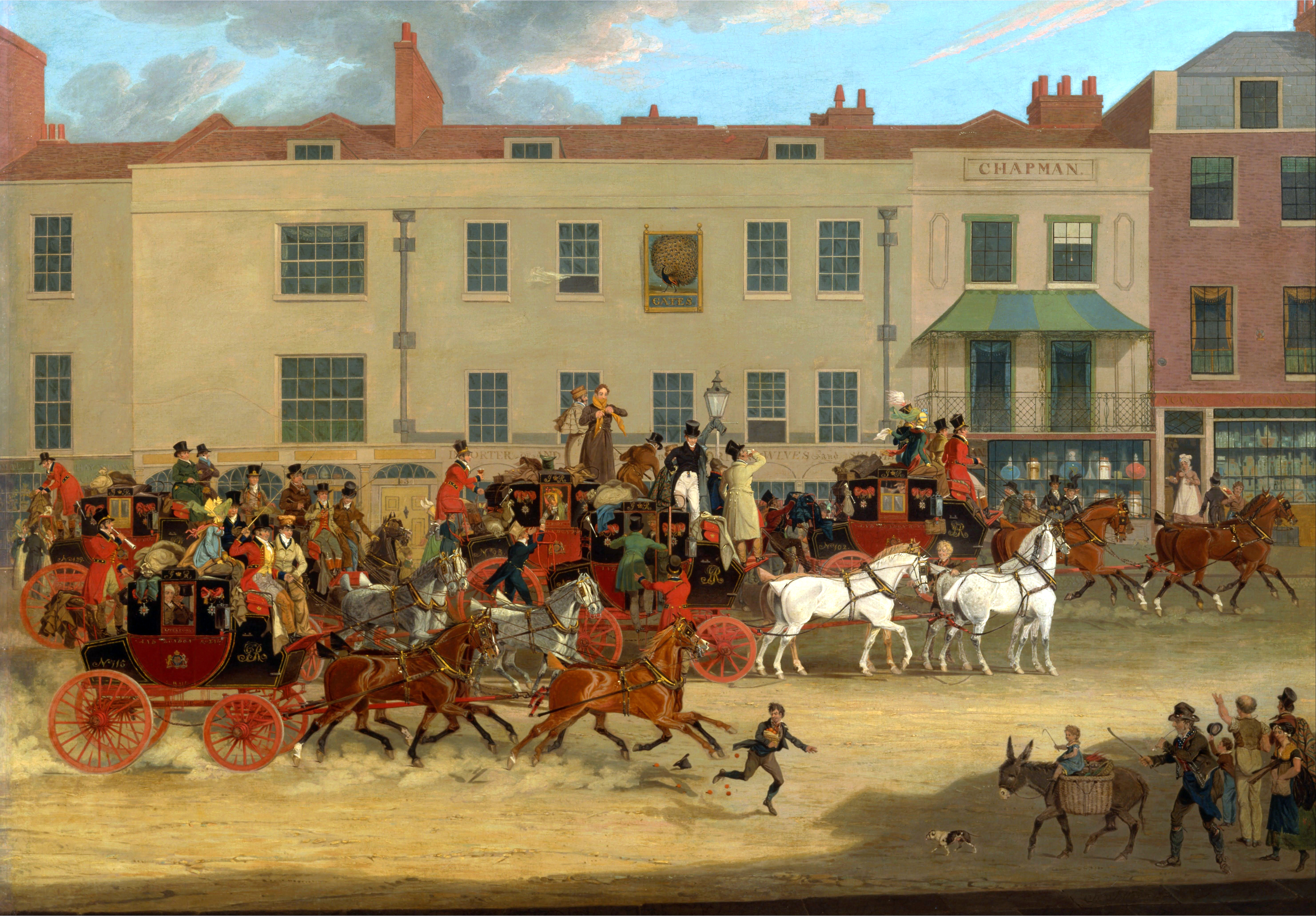
James Pollard, North Country Mails at the Peacock, Islington.

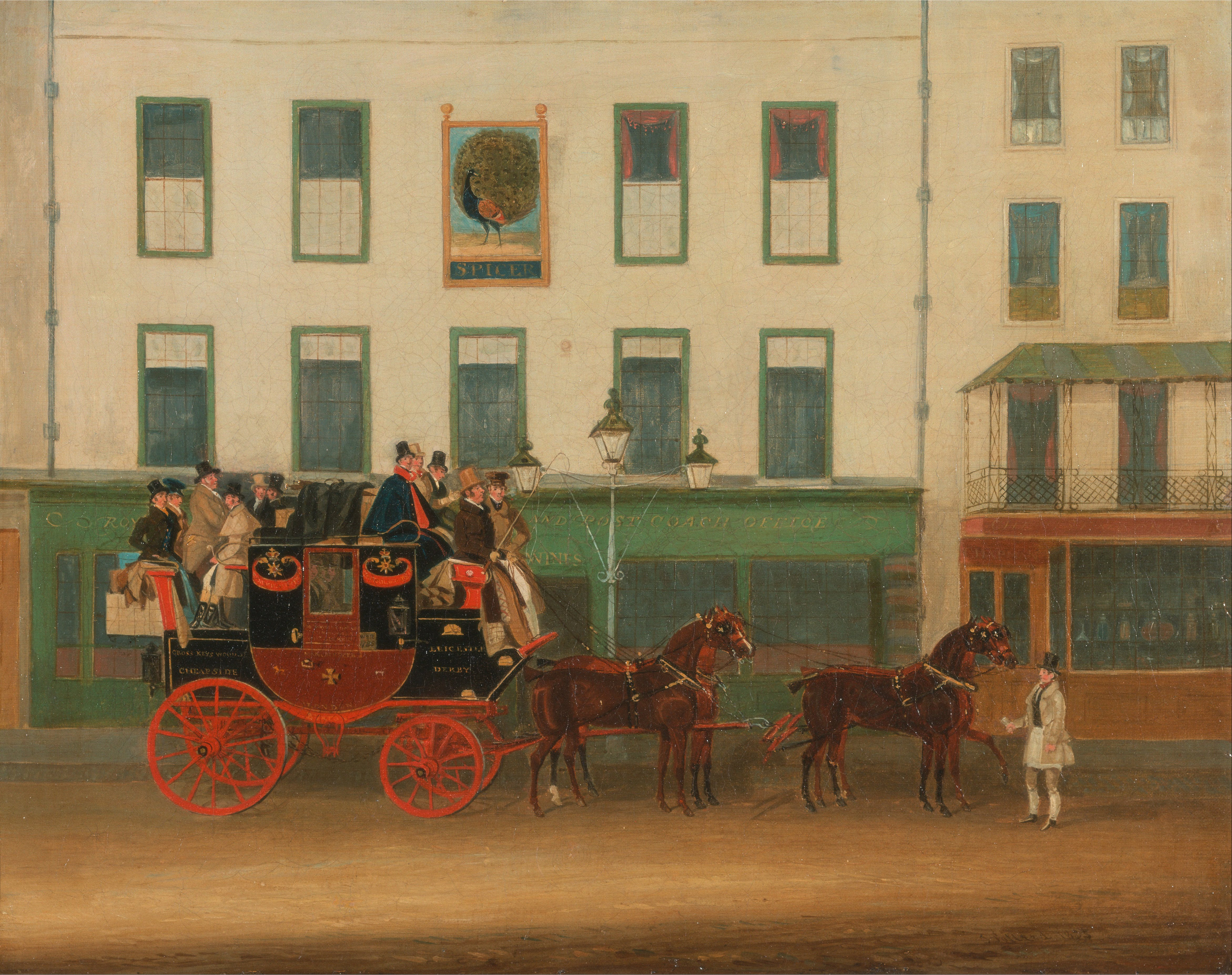
James Pollard, The London-Manchester Stage Coach, "the Peveril of the Peak," outside the Peacock Inn, Islington.

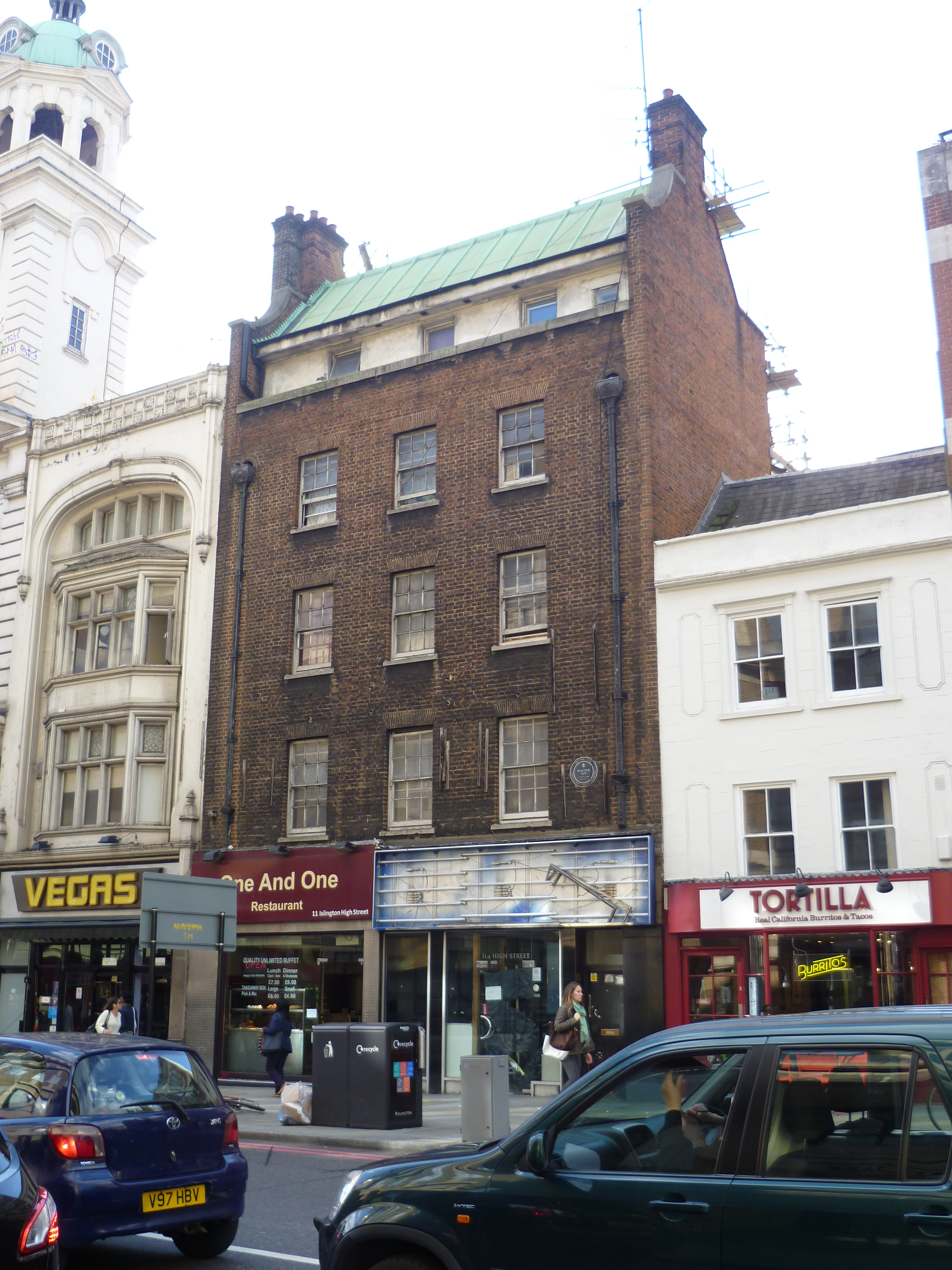
The former Peacock Inn

The Peacock Inn is a former public house at 11 Islington High Street, London, that dates from 1564.

== History ==
The pub closed in 1962 although the building still stands.

== In fiction ==
The inn features in Tom Brown's Schooldays as the inn at which Tom stays prior to travelling to Rugby School. It is also mentioned in Charles Dickens's Nicholas Nickleby as the place where Nicholas stops on his coach journey to Yorkshire.
