= Tibás =

Canton in San José province, Costa Rica

- Canton
- Flag Seal
- Tibás canton
- Tibás canton location in San José Province Tibás canton location in Costa Rica
- Coordinates: 9.9574805°N 84.0810853°W
- Country: Costa Rica
- Province: San José
- Creation: 7 August 1868
- Head city: San Juan
- Districts: Districts: San Juan; Cinco Esquinas; Anselmo Llorente; León XIII; Colima

Government
  - Type: Municipality
  - Body: Municipalidad de Tibás
  - Mayor: José Alejandro Alvarado Vega (PLN)

Area
  - Total: 8.27 km^{2} (3.19 sq mi)
- Elevation: 1,140 m (3,740 ft)

Population (2011)
  - Total: 64,842
  - Estimate (2022): 74,592
  - Density: 7,840/km^{2} (20,300/sq mi)
- Time zone: UTC−06:00
- Canton code: 113
- Website: www.munitibas.go.cr

Tibás is the thirteenth canton in the province of San José in Costa Rica. The head city of the canton is San Juan.

== History ==
Tibás was created on 26 June 1914 by decree 31. It was formerly known as San Juan del Murciélago and was meant to be the capital of the country, at least according to ex-president Braulio Carrillo, this is the reason the town was originally designed with such a neat array of perfectly aligned blocks, cut by the streets running from North to South and the avenues from East to West.

== Geography ==
Tibás has an area of 8.27 km^{2} (3.19 sq mi) and a mean elevation of 1,140 m (3,740 ft).

The canton forms a northern suburb of the national capital city of San José. It is triangular in shape, with the Virilla River as its northern boundary. The Quebrada Rivera, a canyon, establishes the southwestern limit of the canton and also a portion of the southeastern boundary.

== Government ==
=== Mayor ===
According to Costa Rica's Municipal Code, mayors are elected every four years by the population of the canton. As of the latest municipal elections in 2024, the National Liberation Party candidate, José Alejandro Alvarado Vega, was elected mayor of the canton with 37.17% of the votes, with Liliana María Beer Rodríguez and Olga Courrau Quesada as first and second vice mayors, respectively.

Mayors of Tibás since the 2002 elections
Period	Name	Party
2002–2006	Percy Kenneth Rodríguez Argüello	PUSC
2006–2010	Jorge Antonio Salas Bonilla	PAC
2010–2016	Gonzalo Vargas Jiménez	PLN
2016–2020	Carlos Luis Cascante Duarte	PLN
2020–2024	Carlos Luis Cascante Duarte	PLN
2024–2028	José Alejandro Alvarado Vega	PLN

=== Municipal Council ===
Like the mayor and vice mayors, members of the Municipal Council (called regidores) are elected every four years. Tibás' Municipal Council has 7 seats for regidores and their substitutes, who can participate in meetings but not vote unless the owning regidor (regidor propietario) is absent. The current president of the Municipal Council is the Social Democratic Progress Party regidor, Jimmy Villalta Espinoza. The Municipal Council's composition for the 2024–2028 period is as follows:

Composition of the Municipal Council of Tibás after the 2024 municipal elections
Political parties in the Municipal Council of Tibás
Political party	Regidores		
Political party	No.	Owner	Substitute
National Liberation Party (PLN)	3	Dora Alicia Rodríguez Rodríguez	Stephanie Patricia Blanco Rojas
National Liberation Party (PLN)	3	Jean Paul Porras Carvajal	Arturo Enrique Hernández Martínez
National Liberation Party (PLN)	3	Alejandra Ramón Sánchez	María del Milagro Chacón Zamora
Social Democratic Progress Party (PSD)	2	Jimmy Villalta Espinoza^{(P)}	Juan Carlos Rodríguez Cruz
Social Democratic Progress Party (PSD)	2	Carmen Eugenia Sánchez Avila	Irene Patricia Segura Varela
Social Christian Republican Party (PRSC)	1	Manuel René Barboza Chaves	Eduardo Emilio Umaña Álvarez
Social Christian Unity Party (PUSC)	1	Vivian Roxana Acosta Bonilla	Inés Cristina Lascarez Solano

== Districts ==
The canton of Tibás is subdivided into the following districts:

1. San Juan
2. Cinco Esquinas
3. Anselmo Llorente
4. León XIII
5. Colima

== Demographics ==
Historical population
Census	Pop.	±% p.a.
1927	4,579	—
1950	10,594	+3.71%
1963	23,946	+6.47%
1973	35,602	+4.05%
1984	57,693	+4.49%
2000	72,074	+1.40%
2011	64,842	−0.96%
2022	74,592	+1.28%
Source: Instituto Nacional de Estadística y Censos; Centro Centroamericano de Población

Tibás had an estimated population of 74,592 people in 2022, up from 64,842 at the time of the 2011 census.

Tibás had a Human Development Index of 0.766 in 2022.

Tibás includes both industrial and residential neighborhoods and is home of a popular football team in Costa Rica, Deportivo Saprissa and its stadium Estadio Ricardo Saprissa.

== Transportation ==
=== Road transportation ===
The canton is covered by the following road routes:

- National Route 5
- National Route 32
- National Route 100
- National Route 101
- National Route 102
- National Route 108
- National Route 117

=== Rail transportation ===
The Interurbano Line operated by Incofer goes through this canton.
