= N103 road (Belgium) =

Road in Belgium

De N103 is a regional road in the province Antwerp in Belgium. The total length of the road is about 7 kilometres.
