= A103 road =

Road in London, England

Coordinates: 51.5704°N 0.12409°W

A103

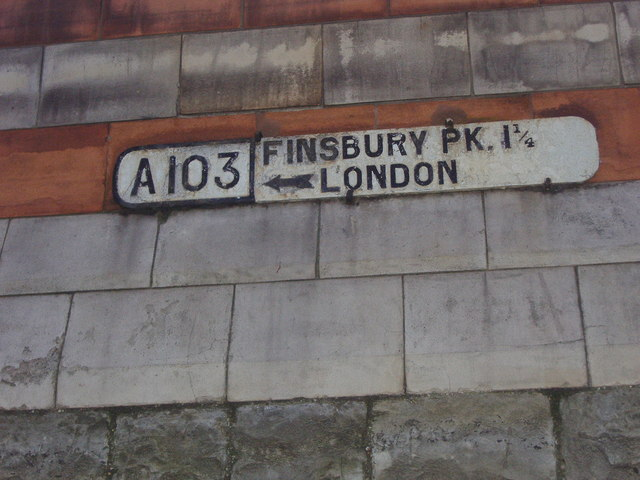

Route information
- Length: 2.9 mi (4.7 km)

Major junctions
- From: A1 in Lower Holloway
- A503 A1201

- To: A504 in Hornsey

Location
- Country: United Kingdom

Road network
- Roads in the United Kingdom; Motorways; A and B road zones
| ← A102 | → A104 |

The A103 is an A road in London, England. It runs from Lower Holloway to Hornsey and includes Hornsey Road, Hornsey Rise, Crouch End Hill, Broadway Parade, Tottenham Lane, before ending in Church Lane, Hornsey. With an average speed of 5.9 mph, the A103 is the fourth slowest road in the country.
