= R101 road =

R101 road may refer to:

- R101 road (Ireland)
- R101 road (South Africa)
