= Thevaram =

- Town
- Location in Tamil Nadu, India
- Coordinates: 9.897°N 77.279°E
- Country: India
- State: Tamil Nadu
- District: Theni

Government
  - Type: Municipal Council
  - Body: Thevaram Municipal Council
- Elevation: 420 m (1,380 ft)

Population (2011)
  - Total: 16,079

Languages
  - Official: Tamil
- Time zone: UTC+5:30 (IST)
- PIN: 625530
- Telephone code: 04554
- Vehicle registration: TN 60

Thevaram is a town in Theni district in the Indian state of Tamil Nadu. Thevaram is located in Tamil Nadu near the border of Kerala at the Eastern side foot-hill of the Western Ghats. It is connected with State Highway SH100.

Farming is main occupation of this Village

== Demographics ==
As of 2011 census, Thevaram had a population of 16,079. Males constitute 49.64% of the population and females 50.36%. Thevaram has an average literacy rate of 69.56%, higher than the national average of 59.5%: male literacy is 75.68%, and female literacy is 63.53%. In Thevaram, 9% of the population is under 6 years of age.

Total number of households: 4225

Population	Persons	Males	Females
Total	16,079	7,981	8,098
In the age group 0–6 years	1,463	738	725
Literates	11,185	6,040	5,145
Illiterate	4,894	1,941	2,953

As of 2001 India Tamil Nadu theni district census, Thevaram had a population of 14,501. Males constitute 50% of the population and females 50%. Thevaram has an average literacy rate of 66%, higher than the national average of 59.5%: male literacy is 74%, and female literacy is 59%. In Thevaram, 10% of the population is under 6 years of age.

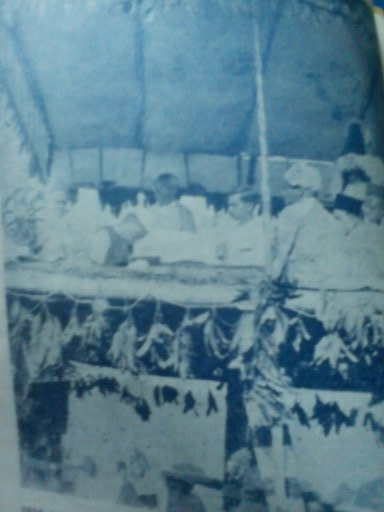
Gandhiji Speech at Public Meeting in Thevaram

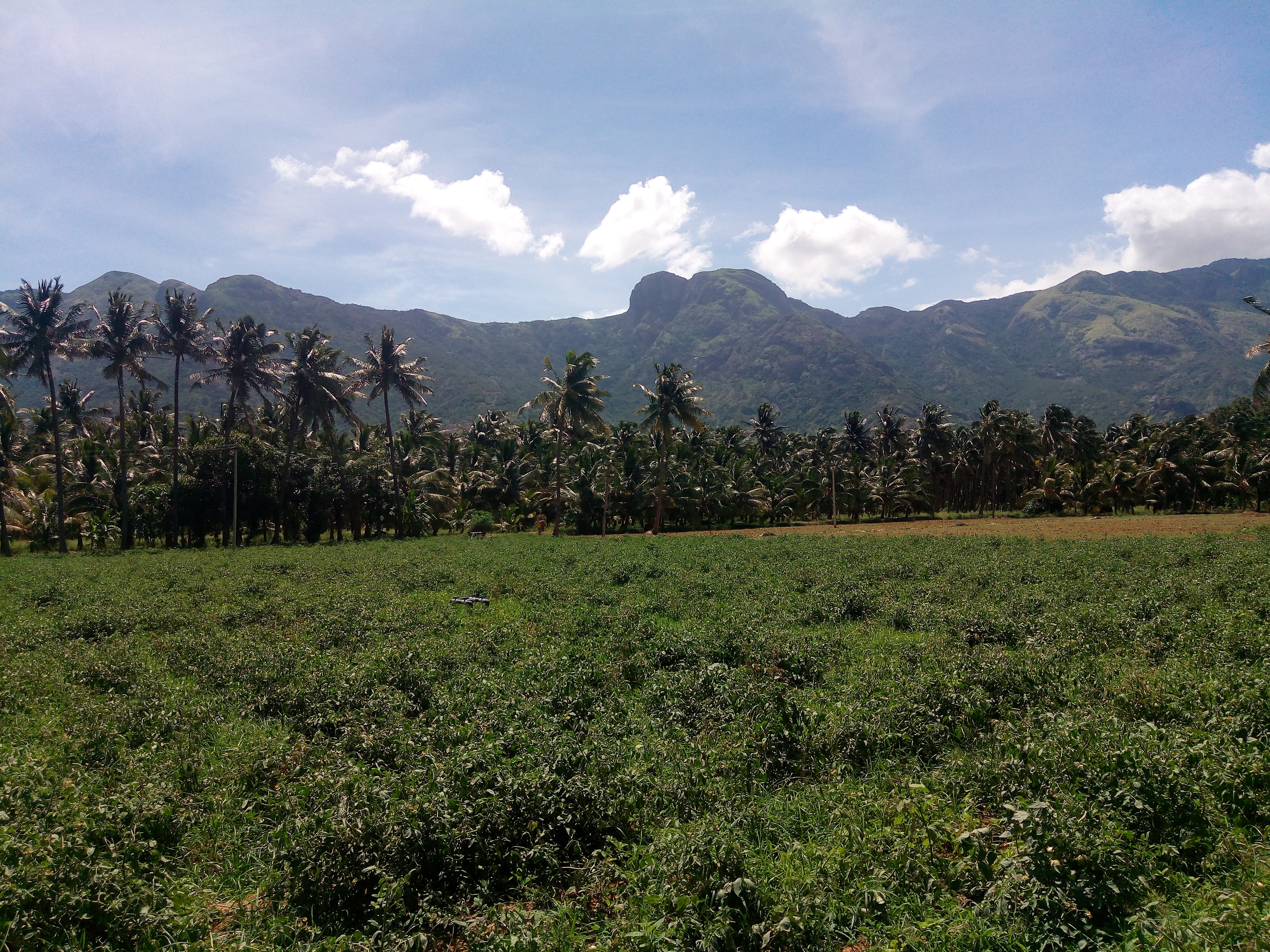
தேவாரம் - மேற்கு தொடர்ச்சி மலை அடிவாரம்
