= A130 highway (Russia) =

Road in Russia

Coordinates: 54°33′58.3″N 34°35′44.2″E

Federal Highway A130
- Федеральная автомобильная дорога А130

Route information
- Length: 456 km (283 mi)

Major junctions
- West end: Belarusian border
- East end: MKAD in Moscow

Location
- Country: Russia

Highway system
- Russian Federal Highways
← A 129	→ A 132

The Russian route A130 is a Russian federal highway from Moscow to the border with Belarus, where it becomes the P43 to Bobruysk.

Within Moscow Oblast it coincides with the old Kaluga road, until the village of L'vovo. Before the fall of the Soviet Union the A130 (then the A101) was used as a southern alternative to the M1 into Belarus.

The route was given a new designation, A-130, on November 17, 2010 in accordance with Government Resolution №928; the A101 designation was used until the end of 2017.
