= Bataan (disambiguation) =

Bataan is a province of the Philippines.

Bataan may also refer to:

== Places ==
- Bataan Peninsula, the landmass in which Bataan province lies, the Philippines
- Bataan National Park, a protected area in Bataan Peninsula, Philippines
- Bataan, a barangay in San Juan, Batangas, Philippines
- Batán, Costa Rica, also referred to as Bataan, a district of the Matina canton, Limón province, Costa Rica

== Other uses ==
- Battle of Bataan, a battle in 1942 in the Pacific War of World War II
- USS Bataan, the names of two United States ships
- Bataan (film), a 1943 US film by Tay Garnett
- Bataan Day, a Philippine holiday celebrated every 9th of April
- Joe Bataan (born 1942), American Latin soul musician

== See also ==
- Bataan 1 and Bataan 2, the call signs for two disarmed Mitsubishi G4M "Betty" bombers
- Batan (disambiguation)
- Batanes, province in Cagayan Valley, Philippines
- Baataan: Choohay Tay Sapp Diaan (Tales of the Mouse and the Snake), a 2016 children's book by Gurmeet Kaur
