= Batan =

Batan or Batán may refer to:

== Places and locations ==
- Batan, Aklan, a municipality in the Philippines
- Batan Island, the main island of the province of Batanes, the Philippines
- Batan Island, Albay, in Rapu-rapu, Albay, the Philippines
- Batan, Binhai County (八滩镇), town in Binhai County, Jiangsu, China
- Batán, Costa Rica, a town in Costa Rica
- Batán River, a river of northern Colombia
- Batán Zoo, a zoo in Batán, Buenos Aires Province, Argentina
- Batán, Argentina, a city in Buenos Aires Province, Argentina
- Batán (Madrid Metro), a station on the Madrid Metro

== Other uses ==
- Batan (stone), a.k.a. batán – a kitchen utensil used for grinding in Andean cuisine
- Batani tribal confederacy in Afghanistan, who believe they all have descended from a son of Qais Abdur Rashid, the mythical ancestor of all Pashtuns
- Badan Tenaga Nuklir Nasional (BATAN), the National Nuclear Energy Agency of Indonesia

== See also ==
- Batanes
- Bataan
- Bataan (disambiguation)
