= Sumapaz (disambiguation) =

Sumapaz may refer to:

- Sumapaz, a locality of Bogotá, Colombia
- Sumapaz Páramo, largest páramo in the world
- Sumapaz Province, province of Cundinamarca, Colombia
- Sumapaz River
- Sumapaz Valley or Sumapaz Region
