= List of shipwrecks in 2014 =

The list of shipwrecks in 2014 includes ships sunk, foundered, grounded, or otherwise lost during 2014.

table of contents
2014
Jan	Feb	Mar	Apr
May	Jun	Jul	Aug
Sep	Oct	Nov	Dec

== January ==
=== 1 January ===
List of shipwrecks: 1 January 2014
Ship	State	Description
Peace	Cambodia	The cargo ship issued a distress signal in the Indian Ocean. Another was issued the next day when the vessel was 225 nautical miles (417 km) north west of Mauritius (17°40′S 54°28′E). She was subsequently abandoned with the loss of a crew member. Nine survivors were rescued by Patris (Greece).

=== 3 January ===
List of shipwrecks: 3 January 2014
Ship	State	Description
KMP Munawar	Indonesia	The ro-ro ferry capsized and sank off Lombok Island with the loss of at least three lives.

=== 11 January ===
List of shipwrecks: 11 January 2014
Ship	State	Description
Unnamed boat	South Sudan	A ferry in the White Nile River carrying women and children who were fleeing fighting in South Sudan capsized, resulting in 200–300 deaths.

=== 13 January ===
List of shipwrecks: 13 January 2014
Ship	State	Description
Pushy	United States	The tugboat sank off Atlantic Beach, New York after being hit by a large swell.
Weeks 236	United States	The 125-foot (38 m) deck barge drifted ashore at Silver Point County Park after her tow vessel Pushy (United States) sank off Atlantic Beach, New York after they were hit by a large swell.

=== 14 January ===
List of shipwrecks: 14 January 2014
Ship	State	Description
BJL I	Indonesia	The ferry capsized at Tanjung Priok.
ECC Topaz	United Kingdom	The windfarm service vessel caught fire and sank in the North sea 11 nautical miles (20 km) east of Lowestoft, Suffolk at around 1pm. The crew of three was rescued by a Royal Air Force (RAF) rescue helicopter from RAF Wattisham, and were not seriously injured.
Elf	United States	The tug sank in the Mamquam Blind Channel at Squamish, British Columbia, Canada. She was later refloated and taken under tow, but foundered off Point Atkinson, British Columbia.

=== 15 January ===
List of shipwrecks: 15 January 2014
Ship	State	Description
Sea Lion	United States	The tug foundered in the Atlantic Ocean off Atlantic Beach, New York. Her four crew were rescued.

=== 19 January ===
List of shipwrecks: 19 January 2014
Ship	State	Description
Rich Forest	Panama	The cargo vessel was carrying logs towards China when it began sinking off of Guam. USCGC Assateague and USCGC Sequoia (both United States Coast Guard) were sent to assist the vessel. The 24 crew were rescued by CS Sunshine (Panama) under the AMVER scheme.
Sportivo	Philippines	The cargo ship collided with Jehan (Philippines) in the Iloilo Strait. Her 29 crew abandoned ship and she consequently foundered.

=== 20 January ===
List of shipwrecks: 20 January 2014
Ship	State	Description
Bitu Gulf	Panama	The tanker foundered in the South China Sea 40 nautical miles (74 km) off the coast of Vietnam. All sixteen crew were rescued by Ever Summit (Panama).

=== 21 January ===
List of shipwrecks: 21 January 2014
Ship	State	Description
KM Sabahat	Indonesia	The ferry foundered off Jakarta with the loss of seven of the 165 people on board.

=== 26 January ===
List of shipwrecks: 26 January 2014
Ship	State	Description
Aqua Marine	India	A tourist boat carrying 45 passengers and crew capsized off of Port Blair, Andaman and Nicobar Islands with the loss of at least 22.

=== 30 January ===
List of shipwrecks: 30 January 2014
Ship	State	Description
Unnamed ship	Yemen	A cargo ship, carrying car tyres and car parts sank off the coast of Al Shehar, Hadramout province with the loss of all twelve Indian crew.

== February ==
=== 1 February ===
List of shipwrecks: 1 February 2014
Ship	State	Description
Le Sillon	France	The trawler went aground at Park Head, near Porthcothan Bay, Cornwall. after losing power and steering approximately 5 miles (8.0 km) off Trevose Head. All six of the crew were safely rescued. Five crew members were recovered by a rescue helicopter from RNAS Culdrose, the skipper was picked up by the Padstow Lifeboat.

=== 5 February ===
List of shipwrecks: 5 February 2014
Ship	State	Description
Luno	Spain	The empty cargo ship's engines failed and she drifted onto the breakwater at Anglet, near Bayonne, France. She broke into two pieces, one either side of the breakwater. Her crew of twelve was winched off the wreck by helicopter.

=== 8 February ===
List of shipwrecks: 8 February 2014
Ship	State	Description
Elland	Saint Kitts and Nevis	The cargo ship suffered an engine failure and cargo shift off Durankulak, Bulgaria and sank. Her eleven crew were rescued by M Izmir (Malta).

=== 16 February ===
List of shipwrecks: 15 February 2014
Ship	State	Description
Armageddon	France	The yacht was boarded by masked persons sailing on a motorboat and hijacked off Îlots des Moines, north of Bonifacio, Corsica. The vessel's whereabouts were unknown as of 6 March 2014. The crew and passengers were abandoned on a lifeboat off Campomoro, Corsica.

=== 20 February ===
List of shipwrecks: 20 February 2014
Ship	State	Description
HMCS Protecteur	Royal Canadian Navy	The Protecteur-class replenishment oiler suffered a fire in her engine room 340 nautical miles (630 km) north west of Pearl Harbor, Hawaii, United States. She was towed into Pearl Harbor by United States Navy vessels. HMCS Protecteur was consequently retired from service and scrapped.

=== 21 February ===
List of shipwrecks: 21 February 2014
Ship	State	Description
Horana	Yemen	The cargo ship foundered in the Gulf of Aden. All eight crew were rescued by HNLMS Evertsen (Royal Netherlands Navy).
Sunrise Orient	Vietnam	The cargo ship ran aground, capsized and sank on Cheung Chau Island, Hong Kong. Her seventeen crew were rescued.

=== 22 February ===
List of shipwrecks: 22 February 2014
Ship	State	Description
Constandis	Cyprus	The retired fishing trawler was scuttled in 79 feet (24 m) of water in the Mediterranean Sea off Limassol, Cyprus, for use as a recreational dive site.
Lady Thetis	Cyprus	The retired 99-foot (30 m) coastal passenger ship was scuttled in approximately 70 feet (21 m) of water in the Mediterranean Sea off Limassol, Cyprus, for use as a recreational dive site.

=== 26 February ===
List of shipwrecks: 26 February 2014
Ship	State	Description
Hanze Goteborg	Netherlands	The cargo ship ran aground in the Elizabeth River near Portsmouth, Virginia. The ship was freed the next morning with no reported damage or crew injuries.
Madanfo	Ghana	The fishing vessel sank off Tema while her crew unloaded a Panofi Company ship of her cargo of tuna and salt.

== March ==
=== 6 March ===
List of shipwrecks: 6 March 2014
Ship	State	Description
Ochakov	Russian Navy	The Kara-class cruiser was scuttled in the Donuzlav Bay, Crimea, Ukraine. The scuttling was part of the 2014 Russian military intervention in Ukraine and intended to block ships of the Ukrainian Navy.
Yakamoz 5	Turkey	The coastal tanker caught fire in the Marmara Sea off Istanbul. Her six crew were rescued.

=== 7 March ===
List of shipwrecks: 7 March 2014
Ship	State	Description
VM-416	Russian Navy	Annexation of Crimea by the Russian Federation: The Yelva-class diving support vessel was scuttled next to Ochakov.

=== 9 March ===
List of shipwrecks: 9 March 2014
Ship	State	Description
Sea Breeze	Barbados	The cargo ship was abandoned in the English Channel 10 nautical miles (19 km) off The Lizard, Cornwall, United Kingdom. Her six crew were rescued by the Falmouth and Lizard Lifeboats. A magnetic patch was later placed on the hole in the vessel's hull and she was towed to St Austell Bay. She was subsequently declared a constructive total loss.

=== 10 March ===
List of shipwrecks: 10 March 2014
Ship	State	Description
Unnamed boat	Unknown	At least forty-two African migrants drowned off Bir Ali, Yemen during a crossing from Africa. Thirty were rescued by Yemeni Navy.
Yusuf Cepnioglu	Turkey	The container ship ran aground on the northernmost point of Mykonos, Greece. Twelve of her fourteen crew were rescued by the Greek Coast Guard; the other two by USS Bataan ( United States Navy).

=== 15 March ===
List of shipwrecks: 15 March 2014
Ship	State	Description
John 1	Panama	The bulk carrier suffered a power failure and ran aground off Rose Blanche-Harbour le Cou, Newfoundland and Labrador, Canada. Her twenty-three crew were rescued by helicopter.

=== 17 March ===
List of shipwrecks: 17 March 2014
Ship	State	Description
Beagle III	Panama	The cargo ship collided with Pegasus Prime (South Korea) in Tokyo Bay and sank with the loss of eight of her twenty crew.

=== 19 March ===
List of shipwrecks: 19 March 2014
Ship	State	Description
HTMS Kledkaeo	Royal Thai Navy	The decommissioned 155-foot (47 m) supply ship was scuttled in 39 to 85 feet (12 to 26 m) of water in the Strait of Malacca off the island of Ko Phi Phi Le, Thailand, to form an artificial reef.

=== 22 March ===
List of shipwrecks: 22 March 2014
Ship	State	Description
Pesante	Netherlands	The dredger sank at Dordrecht, South Holland.
Summer Wind	Liberia	The bulk carrier was struck by an oil barge in the Houston Ship Channel in Texas causing a significant oil spill and closing the channel.
Unnamed boat	Democratic Republic of the Congo	A boat on Lake Albert, returning refugees to the Democratic Republic of the Congo from Uganda capsized with the loss of at least 251 people.

=== 25 March ===
List of shipwrecks: 25 March 2014
Ship	State	Description
Diamond	United Kingdom	A Lerwick-registered wooden scallop-dredger sank after colliding with a rock in West Burra Firth, Shetland. The two crew members were retrieved, however both had been under the influence of a combination of legal and illegal drugs and as such only the skipper, Christopher Smith, survived; his inexperienced crewmate, Leonard Scollay, drowned. Smith was sentenced to a six-month jail sentence following the incident.

=== 26 March ===
List of shipwrecks: 26 March 2014
Ship	State	Description
Sumise Maru No. 38	Japan	The cement carrier collided with the motor vessel Kaisei Maru (Japan) and sank off Hyōgo Port, Japan.

=== Unknown date ===
List of shipwrecks: Unknown date 2014
Ship	State	Description
Unnamed ship	Unknown	The migrant ship capsized off the coast of Beer Ali, Yemen, with the loss of 42 lives. At least 30 people were rescued by the Yemeni Navy and taken to a refugee camp near Mayfaa, Yemen.

== April ==
=== 1 April ===
List of shipwrecks: 1 April 2014
Ship	State	Description
KM Journey	Indonesia	The cargo ship collided with KM Lambelu (Indonesia) and sank off Surabaya. Her 17 crew were rescued.

=== 4 April ===
List of shipwrecks: 4 April 2014
Ship	State	Description
Grand Fortune 1	Mongolia	The cargo ship foundered in the South China Sea off Yeosu, South Korea. Three of her 16 crew were rescued.

=== 6 April ===
List of shipwrecks: 6 April 2014
Ship	State	Description
Hansa Constitution	Germany	While passing Hong Kong during a voyage from Yokohama, Japan, to Shekou, Shenzhen, China, the 193-metre (633 ft), 35,000 DWT container ship suffered a main engine failure in heavy rain and strong monsoon winds in the East Lamma Channel and ran aground at Pok Fu Lam, coming to a halt off the coast of Hong Kong Island only a few feet from a seawall at the University of Hong Kong's Stanley Ho Sports Centre. No one on board or on shore suffered injuries and no hull breach occurred, and she soon was refloated and towed to the North Lamma Anchorage.

=== 15 April ===
List of shipwrecks: 15 April 2014
Ship	State	Description
Ornak	Bahamas	The 228-metre (748 ft) bulk carrier ran aground off Lynnhaven, Virginia Beach, United States, due to high winds. She was refloated on 18 April.
Todd Michael	United States	The tug was driven ashore and wrecked in Lake Pontchartrain off New Orleans, Louisiana. All of 2 crew were rescued by a United States Coast Guard helicopter.

=== 16 April ===
List of shipwrecks: 16 April 2014
Ship	State	Description
Asian Empire	South Korea	The car carrier caught fire in the Pacific Ocean and was abandoned by her 24 crew, who were rescued by Asian Adonis (Panama).
Sewol	South Korea	Sinking of MV Sewol: The ferry sank in the Yellow Sea whilst on a voyage from Incheon towards Jeju Island. The sinking cost 304 out of 476 people their lives. Sewol was raised on 23 March 2017.

=== 17 April ===
List of shipwrecks: 17 April 2014
Ship	State	Description
Tromso	Bahamas	The tanker ran aground in Diego Suarez Bay, Madagascar and was severely damaged.

=== 22 April ===
List of shipwrecks: 22 April 2014
Ship	State	Description
Chanko	Norway	The tugboat suffered a mechanical break-down, drifted onto shore at Edøya, near Sommarøy, Norway, and sank. Her crew of four were rescued by a lifeboat. The wreck was raised in May 2014, and carried to Harstad on a lighter. The scrapping of Chanko at Harstad began in June 2014.

=== 24 April ===
List of shipwrecks: 24 April 2014
Ship	State	Description
Hailey Glasrud Reef	United States	The retired 220-foot (67 m) cargo ship — last operated as DM-ONE (flag unknown) and renamed Hailey Glasrud Reef specifically for her sinking — was scuttled in 186 feet (57 m) of water in the Atlantic Ocean off Stuart, Florida, to form an artificial reef.

=== 25 April ===
List of shipwrecks: 25 April 2014
Ship	State	Description
Ag Marina	Togo	The ship foundered in the Mediterranean Sea 30 nautical miles (56 km) west of Crete, Greece. Four of her seven crew were rescued. She was on a voyage from a Montenegro port towards Odesa, Ukraine.

=== 28 April ===
List of shipwrecks: 28 April 2014
Ship	State	Description
Nur Eye 1	Indonesia	The tanker was severely damaged by fire at Port Klang. All eleven crew were rescued.

== May ==
=== 5 May ===
List of shipwrecks: 5 May 2014
Ship	State	Description
Zhong Xing 2	China	The cargo ship collided with MOL Motivator (Marshall Islands) off Po Toi Island, Hong Kong and sank with the loss of eleven of her twelve crew.

=== 9 May ===
List of shipwrecks: 9 May 2014
Ship	State	Description
Galapaface I	Ecuador	The freighter ran aground off the capital city Puerto Baquerizo Moreno, San Cristobal, in the Galápagos.

=== 10 May ===
List of shipwrecks: 10 May 2014
Ship	State	Description
Nereus	United States	The autonomous underwater vehicle imploded and was lost in the Kermadec Trench.

=== 15 May ===
List of shipwrecks: 15 May 2014
Ship	State	Description
Miraj-4	Bangladesh	The Dhaka to Shariatpur ferry sank during a storm on the Meghna River in Bangladesh.

=== 16 May ===
List of shipwrecks: 16 May 2014
Ship	State	Description
Cheeki Rafiki	United Kingdom	Close-up of capsized hull of Cheeki Rafiki. After a final communication from approximately 38°37.0′N 048°06.7′W during a voyage from English Harbour, Antigua, to Southampton in the United Kingdom, the 11.92-metre (39 ft 1 in) 15.54-gross register ton Bénéteau First 40.7 sailing yacht capsized in the Atlantic Ocean 720 nautical miles (1,330 km; 830 mi) southeast of Nova Scotia, Canada, after her keel detached in 28-knot (52 km/h; 32 mph) winds and seas with a significant wave height of 4.7 metres (15 ft). Her crew of four disappeared. Her overturned hull was last sighted on 20 May, and she presumably sank sometime after that.

=== 18 May ===
List of shipwrecks: 18 May 2014
Ship	State	Description
Baaden	unknown	The yacht capsized and sank upon launching at Fidalgo Marina, Anacortes, Washington. The vessel was salvaged but declared a constructive total loss.

=== 24 May ===
List of shipwrecks: 24 May 2014
Ship	State	Description
The Brig Unicorn	Saint Lucia	The restaurant ship foundered and sank off St Vincent and the Grenadines. All ten crew members were rescued.

=== 26 May ===
List of shipwrecks: 26 May 2014
Ship	State	Description
DNA-90152	Vietnam	The fishing boat was sunk in a ramming incident by No. 11209 (China) in the South China Sea. Crew rescued by other Vietnamese vessels.

=== 29 May ===
List of shipwrecks: 29 May 2014
Ship	State	Description
Shoko Maru	Japan	The tanker suffered an onboard explosion and fire off Himeji. Seven of her eight crew were rescued, with her captain reported as missing. Shoko Maru later sank.

=== Unknown date ===
List of shipwrecks: Unknown date in May 2014
Ship	State	Description
Saloos	Panama	The ship capsized and sank at Cabinda, Angola. The wreck was scrapped in situ. Salvage was completed in February 2016.

== June ==
=== 1 June ===
List of shipwrecks: 1 June 2014
Ship	State	Description
Migrant ship	Flag unknown	The ship sank near Bab El Mandeb, off the coast of the Yemen with the loss of sixty Somalian and Ethiopian refugees, and two crew.

=== 5 June ===
List of shipwrecks: 5 June 2014
Ship	State	Description
Pentalina-B	Cape Verde	While operating as a ro-ro vehicle ferry in the Cape Verde islands, the ship ran aground in a storm near the settlement of Móia Móia on the island of Santiago (15°1′26″N 23°26′21″W); there were no casualties. A causeway was built out to the ship so that the vehicles could be removed. The wreck remains extant on the shore (as of 2019).

=== 9 June ===
List of shipwrecks: 9 June 2014
Ship	State	Description
Viet Long	Vietnam	The cargo ship ran aground off Summer Island, Maldives (4°33′N 73°33′E). Her twenty crew were evacuated on 10 June. During salvage operations on 3 July she broke in two and sank.

=== 18 June ===
List of shipwrecks: 18 June 2014
Ship	State	Description
Galuh Pusaka	Indonesia	The tanker was discovered derelict and abandoned in the South China Sea (3°49′15″N 106°33′20″E) by an Indonesian Navy ship. She was towed into Terempa Navy Base.
Unnamed ship	Unknown	An unauthorised wooden vessel sank off Port Klang in the Strait of Malacca. Survivors, who did not have any travel documents, said they were returning to Aceh, Sumatra, Indonesia. Initially it was reported the passengers were trying to enter Malaysia. As of 17 June, there were approximately sixty survivors, five deaths and thirty-two missing. On 18 June ten people are reported killed and twenty-five missing and the survivors have been arrested under immigration laws.

=== 19 June ===
List of shipwrecks: 19 June 2014
Ship	State	Description
Unidentified boat	Unknown	A migrant boat believed to be heading for Sumatra, Indonesia, capsized in the Strait of Malacca off Sepang, Malaysia, near Kuala Lumpur. Eighteen people (14 men and four women) were rescued by nearby merchant ships.

=== 22 June ===
List of shipwrecks: 22 June 2014
Ship	State	Description
Laboe	Flag unknown	The retired 82-foot (25 m) fishing vessel was scuttled in 80 feet (24 m) of water in the Mediterranean Sea off Paphos, Cyprus, to form an artificial reef.

=== 30 June ===
List of shipwrecks: 30 June 2014
Ship	State	Description
Migrant ship	Unknown	A ship carrying over one hundred illegal migrants sank in the Strait of Sicily with twenty-seven rescued and seventy people missing.

== July ==
=== 2 July ===
List of shipwrecks: 2 July 2014
Ship	State	Description
Pancar Indah	Indonesia	The ferry, a converted landing craft tank, sprang a leak and foundered off Gilimanuk, Bali. All thirty-five people on board survived.

=== 3 July ===
List of shipwrecks: 3 July 2014
Ship	State	Description
AMT Explorer	Malta	The cable barge capsized and sank in the Mediterranean Sea off Sardinia, Italy. Her crew survived.

=== 7 July ===
List of shipwrecks: 7 July 2014
Ship	State	Description
Ping Shin 101	Taiwan	The fishing vessel sank, possibly after an internal explosion.

=== 10 July ===
List of shipwrecks: 10 July 2014
Ship	State	Description
USS Ogden	United States Navy	USS Ogden being sunk The decommissioned Austin-class amphibious transport dock was sunk as a target during the naval exercise RIMPAC 2014 in the Pacific Ocean 55 miles northwest of Hawaii by a Harpoon missile fired by the frigate HNoMS Fridtjof Nansen (Royal Norwegian Navy).

=== 14 July ===
List of shipwrecks: 14 July 2014
Ship	State	Description
Mu Do Bong	North Korea	The cargo ship ran aground off Tuxpan, Mexico.
Priyanka	India	The cargo ship was abandoned off Alibag. Her sixteen crew were rescued.
USS Tuscaloosa	United States Navy	The decommissioned Newport-class tank landing ship was sunk as a target during the naval exercise RIMPAC 2014 in the Pacific Ocean 57 nautical miles (106 km; 66 mi) northwest of Kauai, Hawaii.

=== 15 July ===
List of shipwrecks: 15 July 2014
Ship	State	Description
Unnamed	Indonesia	Nearly sixty people were rescued from a ship allegedly carrying illegal migrants from Malaysia to Indonesia. Two people were reported dead and eighteen missing from the ship which capsized off the southern state of Johor, Malaysia.

=== 16 July ===
List of shipwrecks: 16 July 2014
Ship	State	Description
Escapade	United States	The casino ship ran aground off the coast of Georgia on her maiden voyage. All ninety-six passengers were taken off by the United States Coast Guard.

=== 17 July ===
List of shipwrecks: 17 July 2014
Ship	State	Description
Amakusa Island	Japan	The bulk carrier ran aground and was damaged at Prince Rupert, British Columbia, Canada. She was later refloated but found to be holed.
Gelis Rauh	Indonesia	The passenger ferry was destroyed by fire off Lombok. All on board were rescued.
Millennium Time	United Kingdom	The riverboat collided with a tug on the River Thames near Waterloo Bridge, London. Hundreds of passengers were safely evacuated from the boat, which has a capacity of three hundred and forty. Seven people were injured.

=== 19 July ===
List of shipwrecks: 19 July 2014
Ship	State	Description
Nefterudovoz-32M	Russia	The cargo ship ran aground and sank in the Volga River. She was refloated on 21 July.

=== 23 July ===
List of shipwrecks: 23 July 2014
Ship	State	Description
Ana	Tuvalu	Typhoon Matmo: The cargo ship was driven ashore, capsized and sank at Fuzhou, China. Her seventeen crew were rescued by helicopter.
Sheng Chang	Belize	Typhoon Matmo: The tanker ran aground 60 nautical miles (110 km) off Kaohsiung, Taiwan. Her four crew were rescued.

=== 28 July ===
List of shipwrecks: 28 July 2014
Ship	State	Description
Asaed	Yemen	The cargo ship suffered an engine failure and started taking on water in the Gulf of Oman. Her nine crew were taken off by USNS Richard E. Byrd (United States Navy).

== August ==
=== 4 August ===
List of shipwrecks: 4 August 2014
Ship	State	Description
Diver Master	Denmark	The tug was sunk by Kruzenshtern (Russian Navy) at Esbjerg when a line between the two vessels failed to release. Her three crew were rescued.
Pinak-6	Bangladesh	The ferry, carrying approximately two hundred passengers, capsized on the Padma River in Munshiganj District, 30 km (16 nmi) from Dhaka.
Tahoe Queen	United States	The passenger ship ran aground off Tahoe Keys, California. Two hundred and ninety-six passengers were taken off the vessel in an operation coordinated by the United States Coast Guard.

=== 7 August ===
List of shipwrecks: 7 August 2014
Ship	State	Description
Lilly Johanne	Norway	The live fish carrier capsized at Tuzla, Turkey. The brand new vessel was due to be delivered to her owners in mid-August.

=== 8 August ===
List of shipwrecks: 8 August 2014
Ship	State	Description
Andeswara	Indonesia	The cargo ship foundered off Sumatra with the loss of 13 of her 37 crew.

=== 11 August ===
List of shipwrecks: 11 August 2014
Ship	State	Description
HMAS Bundaberg	Royal Australian Navy	The Armidale-class patrol boat was severely damaged by fire at Hemmant, Queensland. She was consequently decommissioned in December.

=== 12 August ===
List of shipwrecks: 12 August 2014
Ship	State	Description
Sea Soul 1	Tanzania	The cargo ship was scuttled at Dakar, Senegal after being intercepted by the Senegalese Navy whilst gun running.

=== 13 August ===
List of shipwrecks: 13 August 2014
Ship	State	Description
Ponton 1	Germany	The 28.28-metre (92 ft 9 in) tow barge sprung a leak, capsized in the Baltic Sea and sank north of Barber Ort (54°29′N 12°27′E). Her crew was rescued. Refloated, repaired and returned to service.

=== 15 August ===
List of shipwrecks: 15 August 2014
Ship	State	Description
Java Bonitos	Indonesia	The tanker suffered an engine room fire which spread to her cargo of condensate, which exploded. Four of her seventeen crew were lost.

=== 16 August ===
List of shipwrecks: 16 August 2014
Ship	State	Description
Unnamed passenger vessel	Indonesia	The passenger ship was hit by a 3 m (9.8 ft) wave, ran into a reef and sank near Sangeang Api, a volcanic island off Sumbawa. The ship was on a three-day voyage and was travelling between the islands of Lombok and Komodo.

=== 18 August ===
List of shipwrecks: 18 August 2014
Ship	State	Description
Amadeo 1	Chile	The ro-ro ferry struck a rock and capsized in the Kirke Canal. All 55 people on board were rescued. She was declared a total loss. The vessel was scuttled off Almargo Island on 21 September 2015.

=== 22 August ===
List of shipwrecks: 22 August 2014
Ship	State	Description
Unnamed	Unknown	The migrant ship, carrying at least 170 people capsized off the Libyan coast.

=== 23 August ===
List of shipwrecks: 23 August 2014
Ship	State	Description
Unnamed	Unknown	The migrant ship capsized east of Tripoli, Libya.

=== 24 August ===
List of shipwrecks: 24 August 2014
Ship	State	Description
Anugerah 89	Indonesia	The fish research ship sank 39 nautical miles (72 km) south of Denpasr (9°16′S 115°23′E. Three of her fourteen crew were rescued by Safmarine Nomazwe (Hong Kong).

=== 25 August ===
List of shipwrecks: 25 August 2014
Ship	State	Description
Tao Yan	China	The container ship was run into by Gang Tai Tai Zhou (China) and sank 10 nautical miles (19 km) east of Tianjin. Her 22 crew were rescued.
Unnamed	Unknown	A fishing boat foundered south of Lampedusa, Italy with the loss of at least six migrants. The Italian Coast Guard are reported to have rescued nearly 4,000 people over the weekend.

== September ==
=== 1 September ===
List of shipwrecks: 1 September 2014
Ship	State	Description
Tao Yan	China	The container ship collided with Gang Tai Tai Zhou (China) and sank in the Bohai Sea 10 nautical miles (19 km) off Tianjin. All twenty-two crew were rescued.

=== 4 September ===
List of shipwrecks: 4 September 2014
Ship	State	Description
Poline	Cambodia	The cargo ship capsized and sank in the East China Sea. Eight of her ten crew survived,

=== 5 September ===
List of shipwrecks: September 2014
Ship	State	Description
Ince Inebolu	Turkey	The bulk carrier ran aground at Astipalaia Island, Greece. She was on a voyage from Yemen to Novorossiysk, Russia. She was refloated on 11 September.

=== 6 September ===
List of shipwrecks: 6 September 2014
Ship	State	Description
Captain Tsarev	Panama	The container ship was severely damaged by fire at Brest, Finistère, France.

=== 10 September ===
List of shipwrecks: 10 September 2014
Ship	State	Description
Migrant ship	Egypt	A ship carrying roughly five hundred migrants from Palestine, Sudan and Egypt was rammed off the coast of Malta by another vessel used by the Egyptian traffickers smuggling them to Italy. Ten survivors were plucked from the waters in the ensuing days. According to independent accounts of two of the survivors, the ramming occurred after a dispute occurred between the migrants and traffickers. The migrants had refused to transfer to a smaller ship in tow at the behest of the traffickers, due to its dangerously small size, and the traffickers reacted to the refusal by deliberately sinking the ship. The boat had departed from Egypt's port of Damietta on 6 September. Survivors estimated that the drowning victims consisted of at least four hundred men and women, and as many as one hundred children—some who held onto life preservers for days before finally being taken under by a storm.

=== 13 September ===
List of shipwrecks: 13 September 2014
Ship	State	Description
Maharlika II	Philippines	Typhoon Kalmaegi: The ferry foundered north west of Panaon Island with the loss of three lives. Although only eighty-four passengers and crew were listed on the ships' manifest, it was believed to be carrying a total of 166 people. Survivors were rescued by Epic St Martin (Singapore), Lara Venture (Hong Kong) and Maharlika IV (Philippines).

=== 14 September ===
List of shipwrecks: 14 September 2014
Ship	State	Description
Super Shuttle 7	Philippines	Typhoon Kalmaegi: The ferry capsized and sank at Manila. Her fifteen crew survived.

=== 15 September ===
List of shipwrecks: 15 September 2014
Ship	State	Description
USS Fresno	United States Navy	The Newport-class tank landing ship was sunk as a target ship by aircraft and other warships during the naval exercise Valiant Shield 2014 215 nautical miles (398 km; 247 mi) northeast of Guam.
Migrant ship		The migrant ship sank off the coast of Tajoura, east of Tripoli, Libya. Thirty-six out of a total of 250 on board were rescued. A further three boats sank off the Libyan coast from August to September.

=== 16 September ===
List of shipwrecks: 16 September 2014
Ship	State	Description
Hao Jun	China	Typhoon Kalmaegi: The cargo ship foundered 11 nautical miles (20 km) south of Macao. Her fourteen crew were rescued by helicopter.
Santa Rosa	Singapore	The container ship ran aground off Abu Musa Island, Iran. She was on a voyage from Karachi, Pakistan to Jebel Ali, Dubai.

=== 21 September ===
List of shipwrecks: 21 September 2014
Ship	State	Description
Europalink	Italy	The ro-ro ferry struck rocks off Peristeres, north east of Corfu, Greece. All 70 crew and 692 passengers were evacuated. She was later refloated and taken in to Kerkyra, Greece for repairs. Europalink was on a voyage from Patras, Greece to Ancona.

=== 30 September ===
List of shipwrecks: 30 September 2014
Ship	State	Description
Lurongyu 859	China	The coaster foundered in the Pacific Ocean off the Oki Islands, Japan with the loss of nine of her fourteen crew.
Nivôse	French Navy	The Floréal-class frigate was severely damaged by a fire which broke out in her engine room. She was subsequently towed into Port des Galets. La Réunion.

== October ==
=== 5 October ===
List of shipwrecks: 5 October 2014
Ship	State	Description
Prins 4	Netherlands	The dredger capsized at Flamanville, Manche France after her anchor snagged.

=== 8 October ===
List of shipwrecks: 8 October 2014
Ship	State	Description
Fortuna S	Moldova	The cargo ship ran aground and sank in the Sulina Seaway. All twelve people on board were rescued.

=== 10 October ===
List of shipwrecks: 10 October 2014
Ship	State	Description
Ocean Researcher V	Taiwan	The 2,700-ton research vessel sank in the Taiwan Strait just off of Penghu. Two casualties resulted from the incident.

=== 12 October ===
List of shipwrecks: 12 October 2014
Ship	State	Description
Run Wu 9	China	The cargo ship foundered in the East China Sea off Dachen Island. Her fifteen crew were rescued.

=== 15 October ===
List of shipwrecks: 15 October 2014
Ship	State	Description
Alisa K	United States	The 38-foot (11.6 m) fishing vessel dragged her anchor and was wrecked on rocks in Lyman Anchorage (55°33′N 132°17′W) in Clarence Strait in the Alexander Archipelago in Southeast Alaska. The United States Coast Guard rescued the only person aboard.

=== 17 October ===
List of shipwrecks: October 2014
Ship	State	Description
X Press 27	United Arab Emirates	The tug collided with Royal Jade (Panama) and sank off Fujairah. Her crew were rescued.

=== 19 October ===
List of shipwrecks: 19 October 2014
Ship	State	Description
Lenaneft-2013	Russia	The tanker ran aground in the Lena River and was holed. She was on a voyage from Yakutsk to Peleduia.
Tiksi	Russia	The tanker ran aground in the Lena River and was holed. She was on a voyage from Yakutsk to Vitim.

=== 28 October ===
List of shipwrecks: 28 October 2014
Ship	State	Description
Al Riffa; San Felipe	Malta; Marshall Islands	The two container ships collided at Port Klang, Malaysia. Both vessels caught fire. The fire on San Felipe was extinguished; the fire on Al Riffa was severe and the ship was towed out of port.

== November ==
=== 4 November ===
List of shipwrecks: November 2014
Ship	State	Description
Kerch	Russian Navy	The Kara-class cruiser was severely damaged by fire at Sevastopol. She was consequently withdrawn from service.

=== 6 November ===
List of shipwrecks: 6 November 2014
Ship	State	Description
INS A72	Indian Navy	The Astravahini-class torpedo recovery vessel sprang a leak and sank off Visakhapatnam. One of her 28 crew died, four were reported missing.

=== 9 November ===
List of shipwrecks: 9 November 2014
Ship	State	Description
Phuc Xuan 68	Vietnam	The cargo ship collided with Nam Vy 69 (Vietnam) off Nha Trang and sank. Three of her eleven crew were rescued.

=== 11 November ===
List of shipwrecks: 11 November 2014
Ship	State	Description
Hai Run 607	China	The cargo ship collided with Hansa Siegburg (Liberia) off Qingyu Island and sank. Her six crew were rescued.
Vital 355	Philippines	The coaster capsized and sank 20 nautical miles (37 km) north west of Naso Point with the loss of two of her thirteen crew.

=== 12 November ===
List of shipwrecks: 12 November 2014
Ship	State	Description
Nossan	Faroe Islands	The cargo ship ran aground and sank in the Göta älv at Trollhättan, Sweden. All on board survived.

=== 16 November ===
List of shipwrecks: 16 November 2014
Ship	State	Description
Hokuei 18	Japan	The cargo ship collided with Yong Sheng VII (Panama) off Okinawa Island. She capsized and sank. Her five crew were rescued.
San Cristobal	Ecuador	The ship capsized and sank in the Pacific Ocean 25 nautical miles (46 km) off the Santa Elena Peninsula. Her thirteen crew were rescued by a fishing vessel.

=== 18 November ===
List of shipwrecks: 18 November 2014
Ship	State	Description
Perantu	Royal Malaysian Navy	The hydrographic survey ship capsized and sank at Boustead Naval Shipyard, Kuala Lumpur.

=== 19 November ===
List of shipwrecks: 19 November 2014
Ship	State	Description
Al Hassani	Kiribati	The coaster foundered in the Gulf of Aden. Her eight crew were rescued in an operation involving a Luftwaffe Lockheed P-3 Orion, TCG Gemlik (Turkish Navy) and Takanami (Japan Maritime Self-Defense Force).
Johanna Josephine	Netherlands	The dredger struck a submerged object and sank at Wilhelmshaven, Germany. Her crew were rescued. She was later refloated and taken in to Wilhelmshaven.

=== 21 November ===
List of shipwrecks: November 2014
Ship	State	Description
Calypso	Flag unknown	The coaster foundered 45 nautical miles (83 km) north of Cap-Haïtien. Her seven crew were rescued by USCGC Charles Sexton (United States Navy).

=== 24 November ===
List of shipwrecks: 24 November 2014
Ship	State	Description
Zander	unknown	The 26.93-metre (88 ft 4 in) inland grabber dredge sprung a leak and sank 5 nautical miles (9.3 km; 5.8 mi) north of Norderny in the North Sea (53°47′N 07°12′E). Her two-man crew was lost.

=== 26 November ===
List of shipwrecks: 26 November 2014
Ship	State	Description
Super Shuttle Ferry 11	Philippines	The ferry capsized and sank at Balbagon. Her crew were rescued.

=== 30 November ===
List of shipwrecks: 30 November 2014
Ship	State	Description
Åfjord	Norway	The ferry ran aground at Finneset. Her eleven passengers were taken off.
Team Vestas Wind	Denmark	2014–15 Volvo Ocean Race: The Volvo Ocean 65 yacht ran aground on the Cargados Carajos Shoals, St Brandon Island, off Mauritius and was wrecked. Her nine crew were rescued. She was salvaged, repaired, returned to service.

== December ==
=== 1 December ===
List of shipwrecks: 1 December 2014
Ship	State	Description
Oryong 501	South Korea	The fish factory ship capsized and sank in the Bering Sea with the loss of 55 of her 62 crew. Survivors were rescued by the fishing trawler Carolina-77 (Russia).

=== 2 December ===
List of shipwrecks: 2 December 2014
Ship	State	Description
Amaranthus	Palau	The cargo ship (actually Isik 2) (Turkey) was driven ashore crewless on Zakynthos, Greece. Her crew were believed to have been involved in smuggling cigarettes and to have abandoned the vessel, having given her a false identity.

=== 3 December ===
List of shipwrecks: 3 December 2014
Ship	State	Description
Elga-1	Russia	The cargo ship sprang a leak and sank in the Black Sea. Her crew were rescued by Sea Spider (Marshall Islands). She was salvaged on 8 December and towed into Varna, Bulgaria.

=== 6 December ===
List of shipwrecks: 6 December 2014
Ship	State	Description
Unnamed ship	Unknown	The ship sank, in the Red Sea while carrying African migrants from Ethiopia to the Yemen with the loss of at least seventy lives.

=== 8 December ===
List of shipwrecks: 8 December 2014
Ship	State	Description
Gold	Panama	The cargo ship developed a list off Tuzla, Turkey. Her seven crew were taken off.

=== 11 December ===
List of shipwrecks: 11 December 2014
Ship	State	Description
Zhong Zing 7	China	The cargo ship collided with Xin Wang Shun (China) and sank in the Taiwan Strait with the loss of three of her thirteen crew. Four were rescued and six were reported missing.

=== 12 December ===
List of shipwrecks: 12 December 2014
Ship	State	Description
Mutambala	Democratic Republic of the Congo	The ferry capsized and sank in Lake Tanganyika with the loss of 129 lives.

=== 14 December ===
List of shipwrecks: 14 December 2014
Ship	State	Description
Sri Kandi 515	Tuvalu	The tanker was driven ashore at Narathiwat, Thailand.

=== 18 December ===
List of shipwrecks: 18 December 2014
Ship	State	Description
Malaysia Express 1	Malaysia	The ferry sprang a leak whilst on a voyage from Malacca to Dumar, Indonesia. Her 171 passengers were rescued by fishing vessels.

=== 22 December ===
List of shipwrecks: 22 December 2014
Ship	State	Description
M Star 1	Panama	The cargo ship ran aground at Sakata, Japan. Her eighteen crew were rescued by helicopter.

=== 26 December ===
List of shipwrecks: 26 December 2014
Ship	State	Description
Chaulk Determination	Canada	The tug sprang a leak and sank in the Saint Lawrence River at Trois-Rivières, Quebec.
G.B. Corrado	Bahamas	The bulk carrier ran aground in the Atlantic Ocean off Port O'Connor, Texas, United States (28°23′N 96°18′W.
Ming Guang	Cambodia	The cargo ship sank 10 nautical miles (19 km) north west of Ajigasawa, Aomori, Japan with the loss of three of her ten crew.
Pachacamac	Saint Vincent and the Grenadines	The tug struck a sunken rock and sank off Mollendo, Peru. One of her three crew was reported missing.

=== 28 December ===
List of shipwrecks: 28 December 2014
Ship	State	Description
Gökbel	Turkey	The general cargo vessel sank after a collision with Lady Aziza (Belize) off the Port of Ravenna. Of the 11 Turkish crew, two drowned and four were reported missing.
Norman Atlantic	Italy	Norman Atlantic The ferry caught fire in the Adriatic Sea off Corfu, Greece and was burnt out. Eight of the 478 people on board were killed.
