= Valiant =

Valiant may refer to:

== Arts, entertainment and media ==
=== Film ===
- The Valiant (1929 film), starring Paul Muni
- The Valiant (1962 film), directed by Roy Ward Baker
- Valiant (film), a 2005 film about British homing pigeons

=== Television ===
- "Valiant" (Merlin), second episode of the British television series Merlin
- "Valiant" (Star Trek: Deep Space Nine), an episode of the American television series Star Trek: Deep Space Nine and a starship in the episode
- USS Valiant, the initial but discarded name of USS Defiant, in the Star Trek: Deep Space Nine series
- USS Valiant, a spaceship in the Star Trek second pilot episode "Where No Man Has Gone Before"

=== Music ===
- Vince Vance & the Valiants, an American country pop and rock and roll musical group
- Valiant Records, a 1960s independent record label acquired in 1965 by Warner Bros.

=== Literature ===
- Valiant Comics, a comic book publisher
- Valiant (comics), British comic published between 1962 and 1976
- Valiant (novel), Valiant: A Modern Tale of Faerie, a 2005 urban fantasy novel by Holly Black
- The Valiant, a 2020 book by Gurmeet Kaur

=== Fictional characters ===
- Valiant (Caminhos do Coração), in the Brazilian soap opera Caminhos do Coração
- Valiant, the title character of the comic strip Prince Valiant
- Eddie Valiant, one of the main characters in Who Censored Roger Rabbit? and its film adaptation, Who Framed Roger Rabbit

=== Plays ===
- The Valiant (play), a 1924 one-act stage play

== People ==
- James Valiant (1884–1917), English cricketer
- The Valiant Brothers, a professional wrestling tag team of storyline brothers
  - Jerry Valiant, a ring name of professional wrestler John Hill (1941–2010)
  - Jimmy Valiant, a ring name of professional wrestler James Harold Fanning (born 1942)
  - Johnny Valiant, a ring name of professional wrestler Thomas Sullivan (1946–2018)
- Leslie Valiant (born 1949), British computer scientist and computational theorist
- Valiant Swart, South African Akrifaans folk singer born Pierre Nolte in 1965
- Valiant, Jamaican singer born Raheem Bowes on September 19, 1998

== Military ==
- HMS Valiant, various Royal Navy ships
- Valiant-class submarine, the first fully British class of nuclear fleet submarines
- Valiant-class ship of the line, two Royal Navy sailing ships
- USS Valiant, various United States Navy ships
- USCGC Valiant (WMEC-621), a United States Coast Guard cutter
- Valiant-class harbor tug, a class of US Navy yard tugboats that entered service in 2009
- Valiant tank, a British Second World War tank design
- Vickers 131 Valiant, a British biplane bomber
- Vickers Valiant, a British jet bomber
- Vultee BT-13 Valiant, a World War II-era basic trainer aircraft built for the United States Army Air Corps
- Project Valiant, a cancelled Indian secret ballistic missile project
- Valiants Memorial, a military memorial in Ottawa, Ontario, Canada

== Vehicles ==
- HMC Valiant, a customs cutter of the UK Border Agency
- Plymouth Valiant, an automobile manufactured by the Plymouth division of Chrysler Corporation from 1960 to 1976
- Chrysler Valiant, an automobile manufactured by Chrysler Australia from 1962 to 1981
- Velocette Valiant, a British motorcycle made by Velocette

== Other uses ==
- The Valiants, nickname of the British football club Port Vale F.C.
- Los Angeles Valiant, a professional esports team
