= Florida District =

District in Siquirres canton, Limón province, Costa Rica

Florida
- District
- Interactive map of Florida
- Florida district location in Costa Rica
- Coordinates: 10.0484718°N 83.6345148°W
- Country: Costa Rica
- Province: Limón
- Canton: Siquirres
- Creation: 19 September 1911

Area
  - Total: 82.76 km^{2} (31.95 sq mi)
- Elevation: 160 m (520 ft)

Population (2011)
  - Total: 2,184
  - Density: 26.39/km^{2} (68.35/sq mi)
- Time zone: UTC−06:00
- Postal code: 70303

Florida is a district of the Siquirres canton, in the Limón province of Costa Rica.

== History ==
Florida was created on 19 September 1911 by Ley 11.

== Geography ==
Florida has an area of 82.76 km² and an elevation of 160 metres.

== Locations ==
- Neighborhoods (Barrios): El Alto
- Villages (Poblados): Alto Gracias a Dios, Alto Laurelar, Altos de Pascua, Bonilla Abajo, Casorla, Chonta, Destierro, Fourth Cliff, Huecos, Lomas, Llano, Pascua, Río Peje, Roca, Rubí, San Antonio, Túnel Camp

== Demographics ==
Historical population
| Census | Pop. | ±% p.a. |
|---|---|---|
| 1927 | 171 | — |
| 1950 | 525 | +5.00% |
| 1963 | 1,054 | +5.51% |
| 1973 | 1,456 | +3.28% |
| 1984 | 1,794 | +1.92% |
| 2000 | 1,964 | +0.57% |
| 2011 | 2,184 | +0.97% |
| 2022 | 2,382 | +0.79% |
Source: Instituto Nacional de Estadística y Censos; Centro Centroamericano de Población

For the 2011 census, Florida had a population of 2,184 inhabitants.

== Transportation ==
=== Road transportation ===
The district is covered by the following road routes:

- National Route 415

== Economy ==
It shares with Siquirres District the biggest hydroelectrical dam of Central America, the Proyecto Hidroeléctrico Reventazón, built over the Reventazón River by the Instituto Costarricense de Electricidad. Impressive views of the dam are a main tourist attraction in the district.
