= National Route 813 (Costa Rica) =

National Road Route in Costa Rica

National Tertiary Route 813
- Ruta nacional terciaria 813

Route information
- Maintained by Ministry of Public Works and Transport
- Length: 12.530 km (7.786 mi)

Major junctions
- Southwest end: Route 805
- Northeast end: Rogelio Pardo Jochs Canals (Tortuguero Canals)

Location
- Country: Costa Rica
- Provinces: Limón

Highway system
- National Road Network of Costa Rica
← Route 812	→ Route 814

National Tertiary Route 813, or just Route 813 (Spanish: Ruta Nacional Terciaria 813, or Ruta 813) is a National Road Route of Costa Rica, located in the Limón province.

== Description ==
In Limón province the route covers Matina canton (Matina district).

== Junction list ==
The whole route is located in Matina district.

District	km	mi	Destinations	Notes
Matina	0	0	Route 805	
