= Cuja River =

- Location of the Cuja River in Colombia

Location
- Country: Colombia
- Department: Cundinamarca
- Municipalities: Arbeláez; Fusagasugá

Physical characteristics
- Source: Sumapaz Páramo
  - location: Arbeláez
  - coordinates: 4°11′33.5″N 74°16′32.7″W
- Mouth: Sumapaz River
  - location: Fusagasugá
  - coordinates: 4°15′05.6″N 74°32′29.1″W
- Basin size: 85.58 km^{2} (33.04 sq mi)

Basin features
- River system: Sumapaz River; Magdalena Basin; Caribbean Sea

The Cuja River is a river of Cundinamarca, Colombia. It is a tributary of the Sumapaz River, that flows into the Magdalena River, flowing towards the Caribbean Sea.

== Description ==
Source and mouth of the Cuja River south of the Bogotá savanna

The Cuja River originates on the Sumapaz Páramo and flows westward through the municipalities Arbeláez and Fusagasugá, where it meets the Guavio River, Fusagasugá. Upstream of the Guavio River is the Batán River.

== See also ==
- List of rivers of Colombia
