= National Route 805 (Costa Rica) =

National Road Route in Costa Rica

National Tertiary Route 805
- Ruta nacional terciaria 805

Route information
- Maintained by Ministry of Public Works and Transport
- Length: 14.230 km (8.842 mi)

Major junctions
- East end: Route 32
- Route 813
- West end: Route 32

Location
- Country: Costa Rica
- Provinces: Limón

Highway system
- National Road Network of Costa Rica
← Route 804	→ Route 806

National Tertiary Route 805, or just Route 805 (Spanish: Ruta Nacional Terciaria 805, or Ruta 805) is a National Road Route of Costa Rica, located in the Limón province.

== Description ==
In Limón province the route covers Matina canton (Matina, Batán districts).

The route starts and ends at Route 32, it allows access to Matina and Batán towns. In Matina it connects with Route 813.

== Junction list ==
The entire route is in Matina district, of Limón province.

District	km	mi	Destinations	Notes
Matina	0.00	0.00	Route 32	
Matina	4.2	2.61	Route 813	
Matina	14.23	8.84	Route 32	
