= Pacuarito =

District in Siquirres canton, Limón province, Costa Rica

- District
- Pacuarito district
- Pacuarito district location in Costa Rica
- Coordinates: 10.109258°N 83.4091309°W
- Country: Costa Rica
- Province: Limón
- Canton: Siquirres
- Creation: 19 September 1911

Area
  - Total: 219.43 km^{2} (84.72 sq mi)
- Elevation: 30 m (98 ft)

Population (2011)
  - Total: 8,756
  - Density: 39.90/km^{2} (103.3/sq mi)
- Time zone: UTC−06:00
- Postal code: 70302

Pacuarito is a district of the Siquirres canton, in the Limón province of Costa Rica.

== History ==
Pacuarito was created on 19 September 1911 by Ley 11.

== Geography ==
Pacuarito has an area of 219.43 km^{2} and an elevation of 30 metres.

== Locations ==
- Villages (Poblados): Alto Mirador, Altos de Pacuarito, Buenos Aires, Cimarrones, Culpeper, Cultivez, Freehold, Galicia, Isla Nueva, Leona, Madre de Dios, Manila, Monteverde, Perla, Perlita, Río Hondo, San Carlos, San Rafael, Santa Rosa, Ten Switch, Trinidad, Waldeck

== Demographics ==
Historical population
Census	Pop.	±% p.a.
1927	1,976	—
1950	2,165	+0.40%
1963	1,437	−3.10%
1973	2,659	+6.35%
1984	4,357	+4.59%
2000	8,707	+4.42%
2011	8,756	+0.05%
2022	10,061	+1.27%
Source: Instituto Nacional de Estadística y Censos; Centro Centroamericano de Población

For the 2011 census, Pacuarito had a population of 8,756 inhabitants.

== Transportation ==
=== Road transportation ===
The district is covered by the following road routes:

- National Route 32
- National Route 804
