= Germania District =

District in Siquirres canton, Limón province, Costa Rica

Germania
- District
- Interactive map of Germania
- Germania district location in Costa Rica
- Coordinates: 10.168505°N 83.5619224°W
- Country: Costa Rica
- Province: Limón
- Canton: Siquirres
- Creation: 19 September 1911

Area
  - Total: 33.98 km^{2} (13.12 sq mi)
- Elevation: 106 m (348 ft)

Population (2011)
  - Total: 2,471
  - Density: 72.72/km^{2} (188.3/sq mi)
- Time zone: UTC−06:00
- Postal code: 70304

Germania is a district of the Siquirres canton, in the Limón province of Costa Rica.

== History ==
Germania was created on 19 September 1911 by Ley 11.

== Geography ==
Germania has an area of 33.98 km² and an elevation of 106 metres.

== Locations ==
- Neighborhoods (Barrios): América, Babilonia
- Villages (Poblados): Cacao, Colombiana, Herediana, Milano, Trinidad, Williamsburg

== Demographics ==
Historical population
Census	Pop.	±% p.a.
1927	678	—
1950	767	+0.54%
1963	1,453	+5.04%
1973	2,423	+5.25%
1984	2,995	+1.95%
2000	2,425	−1.31%
2011	2,471	+0.17%
2022	3,400	+2.94%
Source: Instituto Nacional de Estadística y Censos; Centro Centroamericano de Población

For the 2011 census, Germania had a population of 2,471 inhabitants.

== Transportation ==
=== Road transportation ===
The district is covered by the following road routes:

- National Route 32
- National Route 415
- National Route 812
