= Alegría District =

District in Siquirres canton, Limón province, Costa Rica

Alegría
- District
- Interactive map of Alegría
- Alegría district location in Costa Rica
- Coordinates: 10.1184859°N 83.58824°W
- Country: Costa Rica
- Province: Limón
- Canton: Siquirres
- Creation: 17 January 1996

Area
  - Total: 37.73 km^{2} (14.57 sq mi)
- Elevation: 420 m (1,380 ft)

Population (2011)
  - Total: 5,656
  - Density: 149.9/km^{2} (388.3/sq mi)
- Time zone: UTC−06:00
- Postal code: 70306

Alegría is a district in the Siquirres canton, Limón Province province, Costa Rica.

== History ==
Alegría was created on 17 January 1996 by Decreto Ejecutivo 24931-G.

== Geography ==
Alegría has an area of 37.73 km² and an elevation of 420 metres above sea level.

== Locations ==
- Villages (Poblados): Alto Herediana, Portón Iberia, Río Peje, Vueltas, Altos Herediana (San Isidro), La Urba Villa Bonita.

== Demographics ==
Historical population
Census	Pop.	±% p.a.
2000	3,600	—
2011	5,656	+4.19%
2022	7,102	+2.09%
Source: Instituto Nacional de Estadística y Censos; Centro Centroamericano de Población

According to the 2011 census, Alegría had a population of 5,656 inhabitants.

According to the Costa Rica 2022 Census, La Alegría had a population of 6,947, with a projected population of 7,157 in 2025.

== Transportation ==
=== Road transportation ===
The district is covered by the following road routes:

- National Route 415
