= Matina (canton) =

Canton in Limón province, Costa Rica

- Canton
- Flag
- Interactive map of Matina
- Matina canton location in Costa Rica
- Coordinates: 10.0099048°N 83.3096247°W
- Country: Costa Rica
- Province: Limón
- Creation: 24 June 1969
- Head city: Matina
- Districts: Districts: Matina; Batán; Carrandi

Government
  - Type: Municipality
  - Body: Municipalidad de Matina

Area
  - Total: 772.64 km^{2} (298.32 sq mi)
- Elevation: 13 m (43 ft)

Population (2011)
  - Total: 37,721
  - Density: 48.821/km^{2} (126.45/sq mi)
- Time zone: UTC−06:00
- Canton code: 705
- Website: {{URL|example.com|optional display text}}

Matina is a canton in the Limón province of Costa Rica. The head city is in Matina district.

== History ==
Matina was created on 24 June 1969 by decree 4344.

== Geography ==
Matina has an area of 772.64 km^{2} (298.32 sq mi) and a mean elevation of 13 metres.

The canton includes the Caribbean coast between the mouths of the Pacuare River to the north and the Toro River to the south. It lies between the Madre de Dios River on the northwest side and the Toro River on the east, and ranges as far south at the Boyei River in the Cordillera de Talamanca.

== Districts ==
The canton of Matina is subdivided into the following districts:

1. Matina
2. Batán
3. Carrandi

== Demographics ==
Historical population
Census	Pop.	±% p.a.
1973	10,489	—
1984	14,723	+3.13%
2000	33,096	+5.19%
2011	37,721	+1.20%
2022	45,329	+1.68%
Source: Instituto Nacional de Estadística y Censos; Centro Centroamericano de Población

For the 2011 census, Matina had a population of 37,721 inhabitants.

== Transportation ==
=== Road transportation ===
The canton is covered by the following road routes:

- National Route 32
- National Route 803
- National Route 804
- National Route 805
- National Route 807
- National Route 813
