= Nilo, Cundinamarca =

Nilo
- Municipality and town
- Flag Coat of arms

- Location of the municipality and town inside Cundinamarca Department of Colombia

- Location in Colombia
- Coordinates: 4°18′25″N 74°37′12″W
- Country: Colombia
- Department: Cundinamarca

Population (Census 2018)
  - Total: 10,555
- Time zone: UTC-5 (Colombia Standard Time)

Nilo is a Colombian municipality located in the department of Cundinamarca. It is part of the Alto Magdalena Province and is situated 148 kilometers southwest of Bogotá

== History ==
In pre-Columbian era, the territory of what is now the municipality of Nilo was inhabited by the Panche indigenous people. In 1627, the Spanish magistrate Lesmes de Espinosa visited Tocaima and its surrounding settlements and ordered the construction of a church on the estate of Francisco de Esquivel, located on the banks of the Sumapaz River. This church was designated for the religious services of residents from the Valle de Picalá and Fusagasugá.

There were two main settlements in the area: Nilo, located near Tocaima, and Limones, situated near the Pagüey River. By the late 18th century, with the aim of increasing the establishment of parishes for white settlers in the region, Father Francisco Antonio Ruíz founded the first church in Nilo in 1783.

The name "Nilo" was inspired by the flooding of the Pagüey River, which resembled the annual flooding of the Nile River in Egypt.

== Notable Events ==
The composer of the music for Colombia's National Anthem, Maestro Oreste Síndici, lived in Nilo. It was in Nilo where the first rehearsal of the anthem took place, which was later officially premiered in the city of Bogotá on November 11, 1887, in commemoration of the anniversary of Cartagena.

== Political-Administrative Division ==
In addition to its municipal seat, Nilo has jurisdiction over the following populated centers:

- El Redil
- La Esmeralda
- Pueblo Nuevo

== Symbols ==
=== The Flag ===
The flag of Nilo

The flag of the Municipality of Nilo was adopted through Decree No. 040 on December 11, 1991. It has dimensions of 2 meters in length and 1.7 meters in width. The design consists of three horizontal stripes of equal proportion. On the left side, there is a triangle overlay, with two of its vertices placed at the left corners of the flag. The third vertex of the triangle is positioned on the central white stripe.

=== Coat of Arms ===
The Coat of Arms of Nilo, adopted through Agreement No. 007 on November 23, 1982, has a Spanish shape, divided into a cut and half-parted design, with a border and motto.

In the upper field, it displays, in its natural colors, hills and the Quininí hill, the Paguey River that runs through the municipality, a tree symbolizing the tamarind, and a harmonium where Oreste Síndici rehearsed the national anthem.

In the lower left section, it features, on a golden background, the head of a bull in black, symbolizing the municipality's livestock wealth. Two branches of coffee with their fruits in natural colors are also depicted, representing the coffee industry, which, along with livestock, constitutes the region's primary wealth. The motto, in red, crowns the coat of arms and bears the name of the municipality in black.

=== Anthem ===
- Music: Eugenio Andrade
- Lyrics: Félix Amado Amado and Germán Ospina

Original in Spanish	English Translation
Coro A Nilo cantemos unidos, con grandeza, civismo y lealtad, estas notas que brotan del alma, como emblema de amor y de paz.	Chorus Let us sing to Nilo united, With greatness, civility, and loyalty, These notes that spring from the soul, As an emblem of love and peace.
I En el fondo de mi patria bella, hay un pueblo de nombre inmortal, eres como en el cielo una estela, que ilumina una noche estival.	Verse I In the heart of my beautiful homeland, There is a town of immortal name, Like a star in the sky, a shining trail, That illuminates a summer night.
II La belleza del río Pagüey, nace en los cerros nilenses, son vertientes de vivos collares, con los cuales adornan tu faz.	Verse II The beauty of the Paguey River, Originates in the Nilense hills, They are springs of lively necklaces, With which they adorn your face.
III Pergaminos de fe son tu manto, tus veredas son óleos de amor, en el cual los pintores del campo, esculpen surcos con rudo sudor.	Verse III Your mantle is a scroll of faith, Your paths are oils of love, In which the painters of the countryside, Carve furrows with hard labor.
IV Oreste Síndici, el gran compositor, dejó un legado de música inmortal, para brindarte el honor y el privilegio, de ser la cuna del himno nacional.	Verse IV Oreste Síndici, the great composer, Left a legacy of immortal music, To grant you the honor and privilege, Of being the birthplace of the national anthem.

== Economy ==
The main activities for the economic sustainability of the municipality are agriculture and livestock farming, which make up 30% of the southern region of the municipality, as well as tourism, due to its proximity to Melgar and Girardot.

Agriculture in Nilo focuses on crops such as coffee, bananas, mangoes, oranges, tangerines, soursop, papayas, and corn.

== Politics ==
Mayors elected by popular vote

- 1992 - 1994 | Félix Amado Amado | Colombian Liberal Party
- 1995 - 1997 | Carlos Julio Ricardo Martínez | Colombian Liberal Party | A continuing progress
- 1998 - 2000 | Félix Amado Amado | Colombian Liberal Party
- 2001 - 2003 | Carlos Julio Ricardo Martínez | Colombian Liberal Party | United for Nilo
- 2004 - 2007 | Carlos Herman Vargas Torres | Independent Civic Movement | Administration and progress for all
- 2008 - 2011 | Freddy Alberto Amado Angulo | Social National Unity Party (Party of the U) | Because Nilo is all of us
- 2012 - 2015 | Ramiro Hernández Vanégas | Colombian Liberal Party | Government with social projection
- 2016 - 2019 | Juan Carlos Martín Caviedes | Colombian Liberal Party | Commitment with responsibility
- 2020 - 2023 | Freddy Alberto Amado Angulo | Social National Unity Party (Party of the U) | Because Nilo is all of us

== Places of Interest ==
The main economic activity of the city is tourism, which comes from Bogotá and foreign visitors.

- Piscilago: A theme and water park located 106 km from Bogotá.
- Lagosol: Another large water park.

Within the municipality, there are several important military facilities:

- Tolemaida Military Fort
- Pedro Pascasio Martinez Rojas Professional Soldiers School
- FedeTiro Nilo Shooting Range: The venue for the shooting sport events at the 2019 National Sports Games.

== Festivities ==
- Festival of Folkloric Dances of Alto Magdalena

== Public Services ==
- Electricity: Enel is the company providing electrical service.
- Natural Gas: Alcanos is the distributor and marketer of natural gas in the municipality.
