= HMS Valiant =

Seven vessels of the British Royal Navy have been named HMS Valiant.

- HMS Valiant (1755), a schooner launched at Oswego, New York, Thirteen Colonies and captured by the French in 1756.
- HMS Valiant (1759), launched in 1759 at Chatham, was a third-rate ship of the line of 74 guns.
- HMS Valiant (1807), launched in 1807, was a Repulse-class third-rate.
- HMS Valiant was ordered in June 1825 as another third-rate, but was cancelled in February 1831.
- HMS Valiant (1863), launched in 1863, was a Hector-class ironclad battleship, scrapped in 1957.
- HMS Valiant (1914), launched in 1914, was a Queen Elizabeth-class battleship that served in World War I and World War II.
- HMS Valiant (S102), launched in 1963, was a nuclear-powered submarine, the lead boat of her class. She was paid off in 1994.
- HMS Valiant will be the second boat of the Dreadnought-class submarine class.

== Battle honours ==
- Belle Isle, 1761
- Havana, 1762
- Ushant, 1781
- The Saints, 1782
- First of June, 1794
- Basque Roads, 1809
- Jutland, 1916
- Norway, 1940
- Mediterranean, 1940−43
- Matapan, 1941
- Crete, 1941
- Malta Convoys, 1941
- Sicily, 1943
- Salerno, 1943
- Sabang, 1944
- Falklands, 1982

== See also ==
- Airborne Aircraft Carrier HMS Valiant From Dr. Who
- Hired armed lugger Valiant
- HMC Valiant, customs cutter
- Valiant (disambiguation)
- Valiant-class submarine
- USS Valiant
