= Reventazón District =

District in Siquirres canton, Limón province, Costa Rica

Reventazón
- District
- Reventazón district
- Reventazón district location in Costa Rica
- Coordinates: 10.2440761°N 83.3873659°W
- Country: Costa Rica
- Province: Limón
- Canton: Siquirres
- Creation: 16 October 2018
- Elevation: 14 m (46 ft)
- Time zone: UTC−06:00
- Postal code: 70307

Reventazón is a district of the Siquirres canton, in the Limón province of Costa Rica.

== History ==
The town of Reventazón is mentioned in 1887 as "a point about 40 miles from Limon". A 50 mile-long railway line, "the Reventazon line", is due to link it to Cartago, passing through a rich countryside noted for its sugar-cane and with valuable copper mines as yet not open for the lack of even a mule track. That line is to have 45 large bridges and 88 small ones; among those is the 600 ft-long Birriz viaduct with four spans of 150 feet each, resting on iron columns, and in some places 200 feet above the water. James Livesey and Son are chief engineers for the railway.

Reventazón District was created on 16 October 2018 by Decreto Ejecutivo N°040-2018-MGP.

== Geography ==
Reventazón has an elevation of 14 metres.

== Demographics ==
Historical population
Census	Pop.	±% p.a.
2022	4,250	—
Source: Instituto Nacional de Estadística y Censos; Centro Centroamericano de Población

For the 2011 census, Reventazón District had not been created, census data will be available in 2021.

== Transportation ==
=== Road transportation ===
The district is covered by the following road routes:

- National Route 806
