= Hughenna L. Gauntlett =

American physician (1915–2010)

- A 1947 yearbook photo of Gauntlett
- Born: September 14, 1915; Siquirres, Costa Rica
- Died: July 25, 2010 (aged 94); Laredo, Texas, US
- Other name: Hughenna Gauntlett Santos (married name)
- Education: Loma Linda University
- Occupations: Physician, surgeon, hospital administrator

Hughenna Louise Gauntlett (September 14, 1915 – July 25, 2010) was an American physician born in Costa Rica. She was the first Black woman doctor to hold American Board of Surgery certification.

== Early life and education ==
Gauntlett was born in Siquirres, Costa Rica, and raised in Jamaica, the daughter of Hubert Gauntlett and Ruth Spencer Gauntlett. Her grandmother Mary Elizabeth Spencer was a nurse midwife.

Gauntlett attended Atlantic Union College in Massachusetts, and began medical school at the College of Medical Evangelists, part of Loma Linda University, in 1946. At Loma Linda, she was the only Black woman in her class of 96 students, and she had to live off-campus, because there was no on-campus housing available for a Black woman student. In 1951, Gauntlett was the first African-American woman to earn a Doctor of Medicine (MD) degree from Loma Linda University.

== Career ==
Gauntlett served an internship at Sydenham Hospital in New York City. She joined Kathleen Jones-King's private practice in the Watts neighborhood of Los Angeles. In 1959, she and Jones-King helped at a large polio vaccination clinic in South Los Angeles.

After marriage and children, Gauntlett entered a surgical residency program at California Hospital Medical Center, and was certified by the American Board of Surgery in 1968, the first Black woman to earn the credential. She became a fellow of the American College of Surgeons in 1970.

Gauntlett became chair of the general surgery department at California Hospital Medical Center in 1980. She was a charter member of the Association of Black Women Physicians when it was founded in 1982. She retired in 1986. In 1993, she received the Olga Jonasson Distinguished Member Award from the Association of Women Surgeons.

== Personal life ==
Gauntlett married a fellow physician, Frank Antonio Santos, in 1952. They had twin sons, who both became doctors. She became a United States citizen in 1955. Her husband died in 1991. She died in 2010, aged 94 years, in Laredo, Texas.
