= El Cairo, Siquirres =

District in Siquirres canton, Limón province, Costa Rica

El Cairo
- District
- Interactive map of El Cairo
- El Cairo district location in Costa Rica
- Coordinates: 10.1933237°N 83.4874542°W
- Country: Costa Rica
- Province: Limón
- Canton: Siquirres
- Creation: 19 September 1911

Area
  - Total: 107.2 km^{2} (41.4 sq mi)
- Elevation: 99 m (325 ft)

Population (2011)
  - Total: 6,082
  - Density: 56.74/km^{2} (146.9/sq mi)
- Time zone: UTC−06:00
- Postal code: 70305

El Cairo is a district of the Siquirres canton, in the Limón province of Costa Rica.

== History ==
El Cairo was created on 19 September 1911 by Ley 11.

== Geography ==
El Cairo has an area of 107.2 km^{2} and an elevation of 99 metres.

== Locations ==
- Neighborhoods (Barrios): Francia
- Villages (Poblados): Ana, Bellavista, Boca Río Jiménez, Castilla, Cocal, Golden Grove, Josefina, Junta, Luisiana, Milla 3, Milla 4, Milla 5, Milla 6, Ontario, Peje, Seis Amigos, Silencio.

== Demographics ==
Historical population
Census	Pop.	±% p.a.
1927	1,070	—
1950	1,252	+0.69%
1963	1,936	+3.41%
1973	1,796	−0.75%
1984	2,411	+2.71%
2000	4,355	+3.76%
2011	6,082	+3.08%
2022	6,926	+1.19%
Source: Instituto Nacional de Estadística y Censos; Centro Centroamericano de Población

For the 2011 census, El Cairo had a population of 6,082 inhabitants.

== Transportation ==
=== Road transportation ===
The district is covered by the following road routes:

- National Route 32
- National Route 812
