= Carrandí District =

District in Matina canton, Limón province, Costa Rica

Carrandi
- District
- Interactive map of Carrandi
- Carrandi district location in Costa Rica
- Coordinates: 10.0072056°N 83.225115°W
- Country: Costa Rica
- Province: Limón
- Canton: Matina
- Creation: 26 November 1971

Area
  - Total: 205.99 km^{2} (79.53 sq mi)
- Elevation: 12 m (39 ft)

Population (2011)
  - Total: 12,047
  - Density: 58.483/km^{2} (151.47/sq mi)
- Time zone: UTC−06:00
- Postal code: 70503

Carrandi is a district of the Matina canton, in the Limón province of Costa Rica.

== History ==
Carrandi was created on 26 November 1971 by Decreto Ejecutivo 2078-G.

== Geography ==
Carrandi has an area of 205.99 km^{2} and an elevation of 12 metres.

== Locations ==
- Villages (Poblados): Barra de Matina Sur, Boca del Pantano, Boca Río Matina, Boston, California, Indio, Larga Distancia, Luisa Este, Maravilla, Milla 14, Nueva York, Palacios, Peje, Punta de Riel, Río Cuba, Saborío, San Edmundo, San José, Sterling, Strafford, Toro, Trinidad, Venecia, Zent

== Demographics ==
Historical population
Census	Pop.	±% p.a.
1973	2,793	—
1984	4,047	+3.43%
2000	9,821	+5.70%
2011	12,047	+1.87%
2022	12,992	+0.69%
Source: Instituto Nacional de Estadística y Censos; Centro Centroamericano de Población

For the 2011 census, Carrandi had a population of 12,047 inhabitants.

== Transportation ==
=== Road transportation ===
The district is covered by the following road routes:

- National Route 32
- National Route 803
- National Route 807
