= Batán River =

- Location of the Batán River in Colombia

Location
- Country: Colombia
- Department: Cundinamarca
- Municipalities: Fusagasugá

Physical characteristics
- Source
  - location: Fusagasugá
  - coordinates: 4°15′22.4″N 74°19′17.4″W
- Mouth: Guavio River
  - location: Fusagasugá
  - coordinates: 4°17′01.0″N 74°32′29.1″W

Basin features
- River system: Guavio River; Cuja River; Sumapaz River; Magdalena Basin; Caribbean Sea

Batán River is a river of Cundinamarca, Colombia. It is a tributary of the Guavio River, that flows into the Cuja River and later into the Sumapaz River. The Sumapaz River flows into the Magdalena River basin, flowing towards the Caribbean Sea.

== Description ==
Source and mouth of the Batán River south of the Bogotá savanna

The Batán River originates in and flows westward through the municipality Fusagasugá where it flows into the Guavio River.

== See also ==
- List of rivers of Colombia
