= MV Yusuf Cepnioglu =

Container Ship in Mykonos, Greece

MV Yusuf Cepnioglu was a container ship that ran aground at Mykonos, Greece in 2014.

== The ship ==
The ship was launched on 28 January 1995 and completed on 25 March 1995 at Peterswerft Wewelsfleth (PW) Shipyard in Germany. Its previous names included Northsea Trader, Texel Bay, Gracechurch Comet and MSC Krasnodar. The ship measures 6,924 GT, 4,984 tons deadweight (DWT) and its container capacity is 545 TEU.

== 2014 incident ==
The ship was voyaging from İzmir, Turkey, to Bizerte, Tunisia, carrying 204 containers with 14 crew members on board. Yusuf Cepnioğlu went aground at 05:30 local time on 8 March 2014 on the northwest coast of the island of Mykonos in a rock formation area and is believed to have sustained damage to a forward ballast tank and was taking on water. The Hellenic Coast Guard crews and another vessel initially rescued 12 of 14 crew members on board, but the master and chief mate refused to abandon the ship. As the condition of the vessel worsened, the coast guard requested assistance from the nearby USS Bataan, which sent a search and rescue (SAR) helicopter team and rescue swimmers to retrieve the two remaining mariners. The two men were treated by Bataan's medical team and then transferred to the Hellenic Coast Guard.

== Scrapping ==
The ship was scrapped at Aliağa, Turkey on 25 March 2015.
