= Kathleen Jones-King =

American physician and clubwoman

- Kathleen Jones-King, from a 1942 directory
- Born: May 12, 1905; Barbados
- Died: December 10, 1999 (aged 94); Los Angeles, California, US
- Other names: Kathleen Jones-King Durousseau (married name)
- Occupations: Physician, clubwoman

Kathleen Heloise Jones-King (May 12, 1905 – December 10, 1999) was an American physician and clubwoman, born in Barbados, raised in New York City, and based in Washington, D.C. and Los Angeles during her career. She was one of the first Caribbean-born women to earn a medical degree at Howard University College of Medicine.

== Early life ==
Jones-King was born in Barbados, the daughter of Joseph Archibald Jones-King and Kathleen Jones-King. Her family moved to New York in 1906. As a teenager, she won a Boys' and Girls' Club award for her science project on ageratum, or floss flowers. She graduated from Hunter College and completed a medical degree at the Howard University College of Medicine in 1931, one year after the medical school's first known Caribbean woman graduate, Pearl Strachn of Jamaica.

Jones-King pursued further studies in gynecology in Philadelphia in 1941.

== Career ==
Jones-King completed an internship at Freedmen's Hospital, had a private practice in Washington, D.C., spoke at public health events, and taught bacteriology courses at Howard University. She spent much of her career practicing medicine in the Watts neighborhood of Los Angeles, sharing a practice with Hughenna L. Gauntlett. In 1959, she and Gauntlett helped at a large polio vaccination clinic in South Los Angeles. She was also a resident physician at Kern General Hospital in California.

Jones-King served on the advisory board of the Handicapped Placement Center of Los Angeles, a job-placement program. She was one of the three women doctors who ran a twice-monthly women's clinic at San Antonio Health Center, sponsored by the Huntington Park Woman's Club.

Jones-King was active in Twelve Big Sisters, a philanthropic women's club in Los Angeles. She was also a patron of the Jack and Jill Club of Los Angeles, and a member of Sigma Gamma Rho. She was a charter life member of the Howard University Medical Alumni Association.

== Personal life ==
Jones-King married John Steele in 1936; he died two months later. She later married A. P. Durousseau; they divorced in 1953. She had two sons, Wilburn Pinkard Durousseau, who also became a medical doctor, and Joseph-Pierre. She died in 1999, aged 94 years.
