= USS Valiant =

USS Valiant has been the name of more than one United States Navy ship, and may refer to:

- USS Valiant (SP-535), a patrol vessel in commission from 1917 to 1919
- USS Valiant (PYc-51), ex-USS PC-509, a submarine chaser, later coastal patrol yacht, in commission from 1941 to 1944
- Valiant (YT-802), a Valiant-class tugboat

== Other ==
- USCGC Valiant (WMEC-621), United States Coast Guard medium endurance cutter

== See also ==
- HMS Valiant
- Valiant (disambiguation)
