= National Route 806 (Costa Rica) =

National Road Route in Costa Rica

National Tertiary Route 806
- Ruta nacional terciaria 806

Route information
- Maintained by Ministry of Public Works and Transport
- Length: 36.840 km (22.891 mi)

Location
- Country: Costa Rica
- Provinces: Limón

Highway system
- National Road Network of Costa Rica
← Route 805	→ Route 807

National Tertiary Route 806, or just Route 806 (Spanish: Ruta Nacional Terciaria 806, or Ruta 806) is a National Road Route of Costa Rica, located in the Limón province.

== Description ==
In Limón province the route covers Siquirres canton (Siquirres and Reventazón districts).
