= National Route 812 (Costa Rica) =

National Road Route in Costa Rica

National Tertiary Route 812
- Ruta nacional terciaria 812

Route information
- Maintained by Ministry of Public Works and Transport
- Length: 22.440 km (13.944 mi)

Location
- Country: Costa Rica
- Provinces: Limón

Highway system
- National Road Network of Costa Rica
← Route 811	→ Route 813

National Tertiary Route 812, or just Route 812 (Spanish: Ruta Nacional Terciaria 812, or Ruta 812) is a National Road Route of Costa Rica, located in the Limón province.

== Description ==
In Limón province the route covers Siquirres canton (Germania and Cairo districts).
