= National Route 803 (Costa Rica) =

National Road Route in Costa Rica

National Tertiary Route 803
- Ruta nacional terciaria 803

Route information
- Maintained by Ministry of Public Works and Transport
- Length: 10.070 km (6.257 mi)

Location
- Country: Costa Rica
- Provinces: Limón

Highway system
- National Road Network of Costa Rica
← Route 802	→ Route 804

National Tertiary Route 803, or just Route 803 (Spanish: Ruta Nacional Terciaria 803, or Ruta 803) is a National Road Route of Costa Rica, located in the Limón province.

== Description ==
In Limón province the route covers Matina canton (Carrandi district).
