= National Route 804 (Costa Rica) =

National Road Route in Costa Rica

National Tertiary Route 804
- Ruta nacional terciaria 804

Route information
- Maintained by Ministry of Public Works and Transport
- Length: 17.300 km (10.750 mi)

Location
- Country: Costa Rica
- Provinces: Limón

Highway system
- National Road Network of Costa Rica
← Route 803	→ Route 805

National Tertiary Route 804, or just Route 804 (Spanish: Ruta Nacional Terciaria 804, or Ruta 804) is a National Road Route of Costa Rica, located in the Limón province.

== Description ==
In Limón province the route covers Siquirres canton (Pacuarito district) and Matina canton (Batán district).
