= Siquirres (canton) =

Canton in Limón province, Costa Rica

- Canton
- Flag
- Siquirres canton
- Siquirres canton location in Costa Rica
- Coordinates: 10.1515146°N 83.4957515°W
- Country: Costa Rica
- Province: Limón
- Creation: 19 September 1911
- Head city: Siquirres
- Districts: Districts: Siquirres; Pacuarito; Florida; Germania; Cairo; Alegría; Reventazón

Government
  - Type: Municipality
  - Body: Municipalidad de Siquirres

Area
  - Total: 860.19 km^{2} (332.12 sq mi)
- Elevation: 127 m (417 ft)

Population (2011)
  - Total: 56,786
  - Density: 66.016/km^{2} (170.98/sq mi)
- Time zone: UTC−06:00
- Canton code: 703
- Website: siquirres.go.cr

Siquirres is a canton in the Limón province of Costa Rica. The head city is in Siquirres district.

== History ==
Siquirres was created on 19 September 1911 by decree 11.

== Geography ==
Siquirres has an area of 860.19 km^{2} (332.12 sq mi) and a mean elevation of 127 metres.

The canton touches the Caribbean coast between the mouths of the Pacuare River to the southeast and the Parismina River to the northwest. It encompasses territory in a southwest direction, between the Madre de Dios River on the southeast side and the Destierro River on the northwest, as far as the southernmost portion of the Cordillera Central.

The area is drained by the rivers Reventazón, Parismina, Pacuare River, Madre de Dios, Matina River, and Siquirres River.

== Climate ==
The climate is warm, wet with temperatures between 25 and 26 Degrees Celsius.

== Districts ==
The canton of Siquirres is subdivided into the following districts:

1. Siquirres
2. Pacuarito
3. Florida
4. Germania
5. Cairo
6. Alegría
7. Reventazón

== Demographics ==
Historical population
Census	Pop.	±% p.a.
1927	6,880	—
1950	7,541	+0.40%
1963	11,317	+3.17%
1973	18,133	+4.83%
1984	29,079	+4.39%
2000	52,409	+3.75%
2011	56,786	+0.73%
2022	63,765	+1.06%
Source: Instituto Nacional de Estadística y Censos; Centro Centroamericano de Población

For the 2011 census, Siquirres had a population of 56,786 inhabitants.

== Transportation ==
=== Road transportation ===
The canton is covered by the following road routes:

- National Route 10
- National Route 32
- National Route 415
- National Route 804
- National Route 806
- National Route 812

== Tourism ==
Areas of interest to tourists include Pacuare Tourist Center, Barra del Parismina, Barra del Pacuare and Laguna Madre de Dios.

== Commerce ==
Agriculture products include: Banana, cacao, corn, coconut, plantain, rice, cassava, soursop, macadamia, nuts, pasión fruit and ginger. Fishing and cattle are also important.
