= National Route 807 (Costa Rica) =

National Road Route in Costa Rica

National Tertiary Route 807
- Ruta nacional terciaria 807

Route information
- Maintained by Ministry of Public Works and Transport
- Length: 3.180 km (1.976 mi)

Location
- Country: Costa Rica
- Provinces: Limón

Highway system
- National Road Network of Costa Rica
← Route 806	→ Route 809

National Tertiary Route 807, or just Route 807 (Spanish: Ruta Nacional Terciaria 807, or Ruta 807) is a National Road Route of Costa Rica, located in the Limón province.

== Description ==
In Limón province the route covers Matina canton (Carrandi district).
