= Batán, Argentina =

Batán
- City
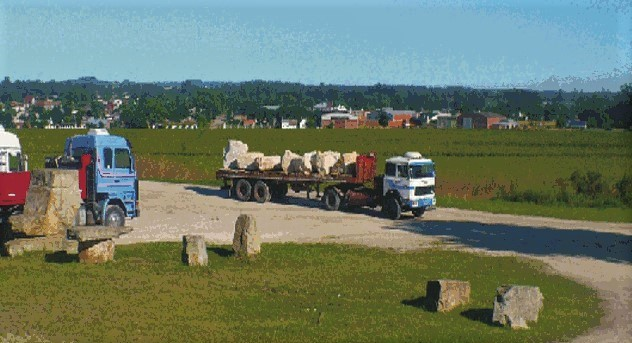
- A dump truck carrying rocks from a local quarry, with Batán town in the background

- Location of Batán in Argentina
- Coordinates: 38°00′28″S 57°42′35″W
- Country: Argentina
- Province: Buenos Aires Province
- Partido: General Pueyrredon

Government
  - Municipal Delegate: Alejandro Estrada (Juntos por el Cambio)

Area
  - Total: 542 km^{2} (209 sq mi)

Population (2010)
  - Total: 10,152
- Time zone: UTC−3 (ART)
- CPA base: S7600
- Dialing code: +54 0223
- Website: Delegacion Batán

Batán is a small town in General Pueyrredón district, Buenos Aires Province, Argentina, on both sides of Provincial Route 88, some 10 kilometres (6.2 mi) west of the city of Mar del Plata. As of the census of 2010, the settlement had a population of 10,152.

Batán is the head of the Batán Municipal District (Delegación Batán), which includes the neighbourhoods of Colina Alegre, Lomas de Batán, Villa Serrana, Estación Chapadmalal, Colina Alegre, El Boquerón, Parque Palermo, Parque Hermoso, Valle Hermoso, Dos Marías, Las Canteras, El Colmenar and Mar del Plata's Industrial Park.

== History ==
The origins of the city can be traced to the grocery store owned by the sons of Spanish landowner Domingo Batán, founded in 1901. A small rural village began to take shape around the establishment, but it was not until 1937, when entrepreneur Emilio Larraya built a filing station on the recently inaugurated Route 88, which runs between Mar del Plata and Necochea, that a permanent settlement was formed. By 1946, a social club, a cooperative and a development society had been established. The town and the surrounding areas gained the status of Municipal District in 1968. Batán was declared a city on 18 December 1996 by the Legislature of Buenos Aires Province.

== Economy ==
Batán comprises a vast area of farms producing vegetables that supply markets in nearby Mar del Plata and other districts. In the village of Chapadmalal, south of the city itself, there are sandstone quarries, and within the district boundaries lays Mar del Plata's Industrial Park. Brickworks also play a key role among Batán's industries.

== Gallery ==
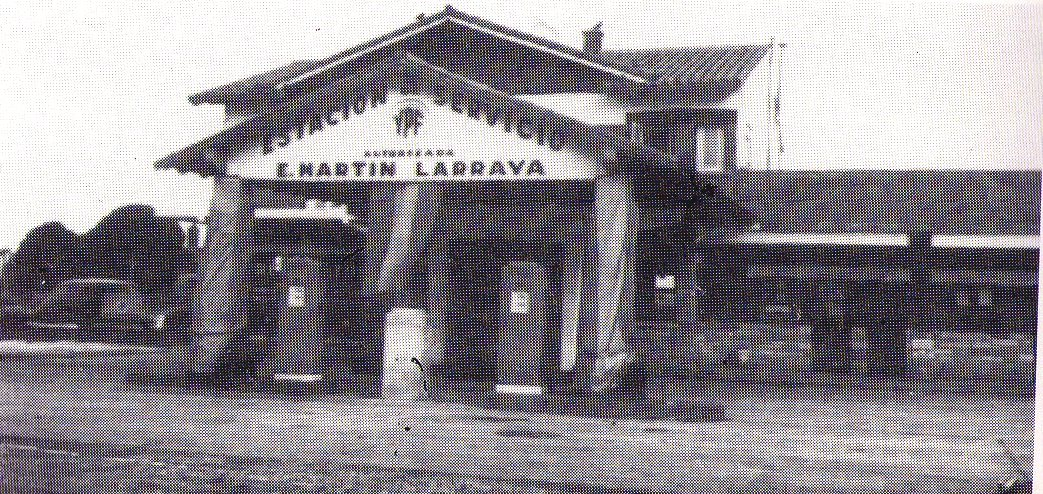
Old building of Larraya's filling station in the 1960s

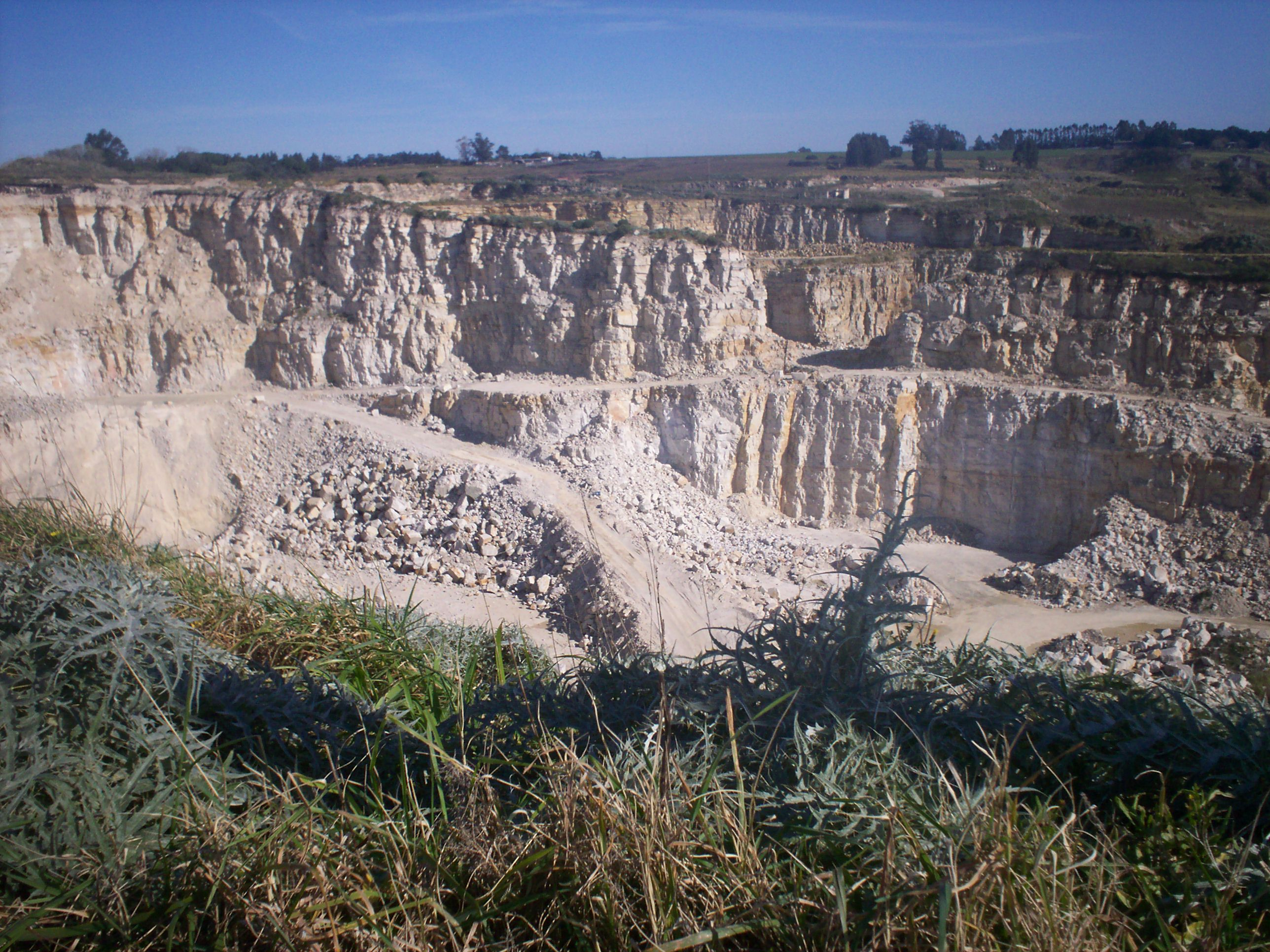
A quarry in Chapadmalal
