= Siquirres =

District in Siquirres canton, Limón province, Costa Rica

- District
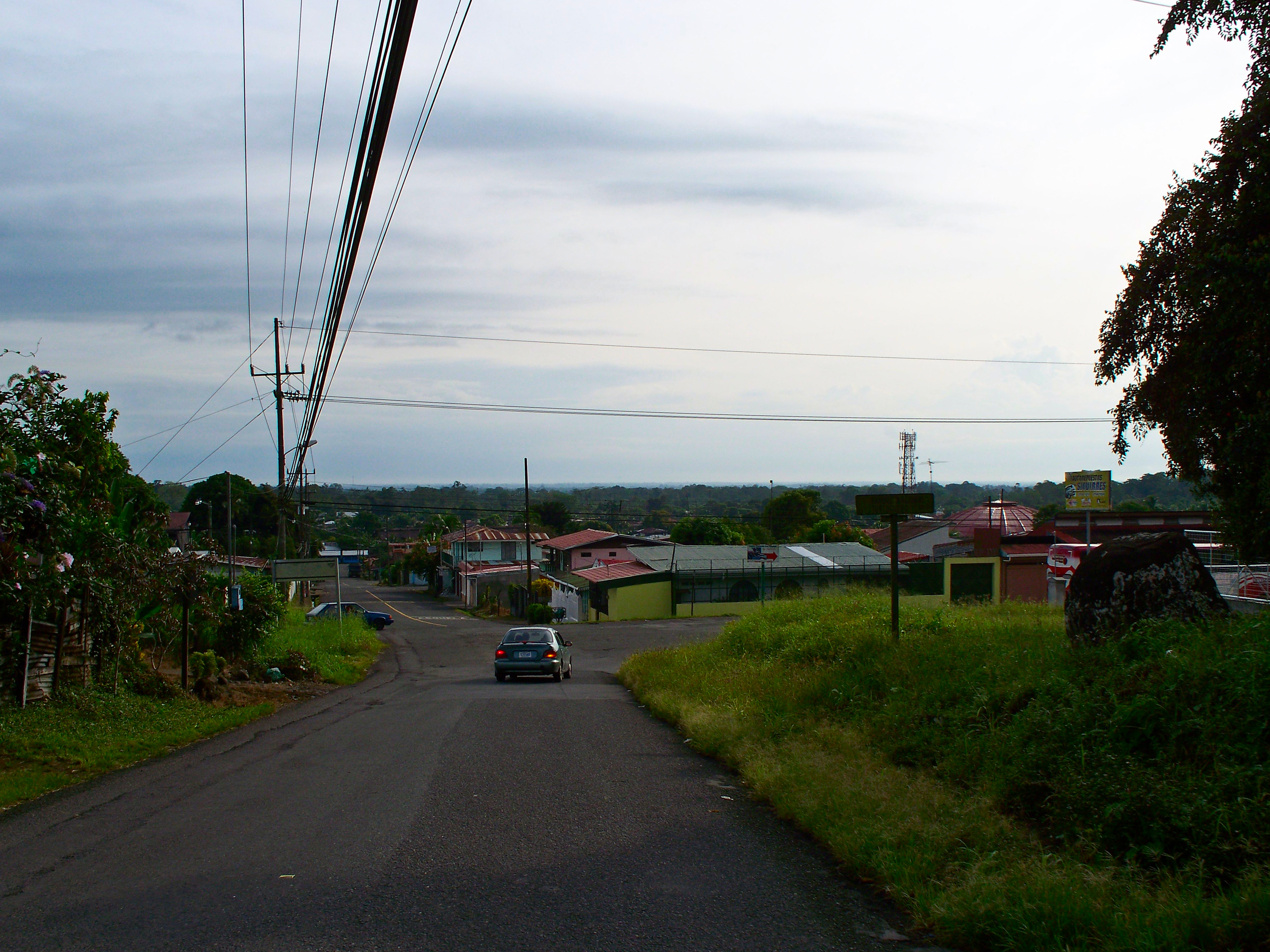
- Siquirres town entrance
- Siquirres district
- Siquirres district location in Costa Rica
- Coordinates: 10.0900655°N 83.5016257°W
- Country: Costa Rica
- Province: Limón
- Canton: Siquirres
- Creation: 19 September 1911

Area
  - Total: 373.27 km^{2} (144.12 sq mi)
- Elevation: 62 m (203 ft)

Population (2011)
  - Total: 31,637
  - Density: 84.756/km^{2} (219.52/sq mi)
- Time zone: UTC−06:00
- Postal code: 70301

Siquirres is a district of the Siquirres canton, in the Limón province of Costa Rica. It is a center of commerce and has most of the services for the area's locals.

== Toponymy ==
The name is derived from a native word meaning reddish colored.

== History ==
Siquirres was created on 19 September 1911 by Ley 11.

== Geography ==
Siquirres has an area of 373.27 km^{2} and an elevation of 62 metres.

== Locations ==
- Neighborhoods (Barrios): María Auxiliadora, Brooklin, San Rafael, San Martín, Triunfo, Miraflores, El Invu, Siquirritos, Betania
- Villages (Poblados): Alto Guayacán, Amelia, Amistad, Bajo Tigre, Barnstorf, Betania, Boca Pacuare, Boca Parismina, Calvario, Calle Tajo, Canadá, Caño Blanco, Carmen, Celina, El Coco, El Cocal, Dos Bocas, Encanto (norte), Encanto (sur), Ganga, Imperio, Indiana Dos, Indiana Tres, Indiana Uno, Islona, Lindavista, Livingston, Lucha, Milla 52, Moravia, Morazán, Nueva Esperanza, Nueva Virginia, San Alberto Nuevo, San Alberto Viejo, San Alejo, San Joaquín, Santo Domingo

== Demographics ==
Historical population
Census	Pop.	±% p.a.
1892	775	—
1927	2,985	+3.93%
1950	2,832	−0.23%
1963	5,437	+5.15%
1973	9,799	+6.07%
1984	17,522	+5.43%
2000	31,358	+3.70%
2011	31,637	+0.08%
2022	29,644	−0.59%
Source: Instituto Nacional de Estadística y Censos; Centro Centroamericano de Población

For the 2011 census, Siquirres had a population of 31,637 inhabitants.

== Notable people ==
- Esteban Alvarado, football goalkeeper
- Hughenna L. Gauntlett, American surgeon

== Transportation ==
=== Road transportation ===
The district is covered by the following road routes:

- National Route 10
- National Route 32
- National Route 806
