= Batán, Costa Rica =

District in Matina canton, Limón province, Costa Rica

Batán
- District
- Interactive map of Batán
- Batán district location in Costa Rica
- Coordinates: 10.1040546°N 83.3529038°W
- Country: Costa Rica
- Province: Limón
- Canton: Matina
- Creation: 25 June 1969

Area
  - Total: 213.69 km^{2} (82.51 sq mi)
- Elevation: 15 m (49 ft)

Population (2011)
  - Total: 16,532
  - Density: 77.364/km^{2} (200.37/sq mi)
- Time zone: UTC−06:00
- Postal code: 70502

Batán or Bataan is a district of the Matina canton, in the Limón province of Costa Rica.

== History ==
Batán was created on 25 June 1969 by Ley 4345.

== Geography ==
Batán has an area of 213.69 km² and an elevation of 15 metres.

== Locations ==
- Neighborhoods (Barrios): Milla 25
- Villages (Poblados): Barbilla, Berta, Damasco, Davao, Goshen, Leyte, Lola, Luzón, Margarita, Milla 24, Milla 27, Milla 28, Oracabesa, Parcelas, Sahara, Santa Marta, Titán, Vegas

== Demographics ==
Historical population
Census	Pop.	±% p.a.
1973	5,109	—
1984	6,712	+2.51%
2000	14,546	+4.95%
2022	21,220	+1.73%
Source: Instituto Nacional de Estadística y Censos; Centro Centroamericano de Población

For the 2011 census, Batán had a population of 16,532 inhabitants.

== Transportation ==
=== Road transportation ===
The district is covered by the following road routes:

- National Route 32
- National Route 804
- National Route 805
