= USS Bataan =

Two ships of the United States Navy have been named USS Bataan, after the Bataan Peninsula, the scene of the Battle of Bataan in 1942 in the Philippines.

- USS Bataan (CVL-29), was a light aircraft carrier that served in both World War II and the Korean War.
- USS Bataan (LHD-5), is an amphibious assault ship commissioned in 1997 and currently on active service.

== See also ==
- HMAS Bataan (I91) - Australian destroyer named to commemorate the same action
