= Sumapaz Páramo =

Mountain ecosystem in Colombia

Páramo de Sumapaz
- IUCN category II (national park)
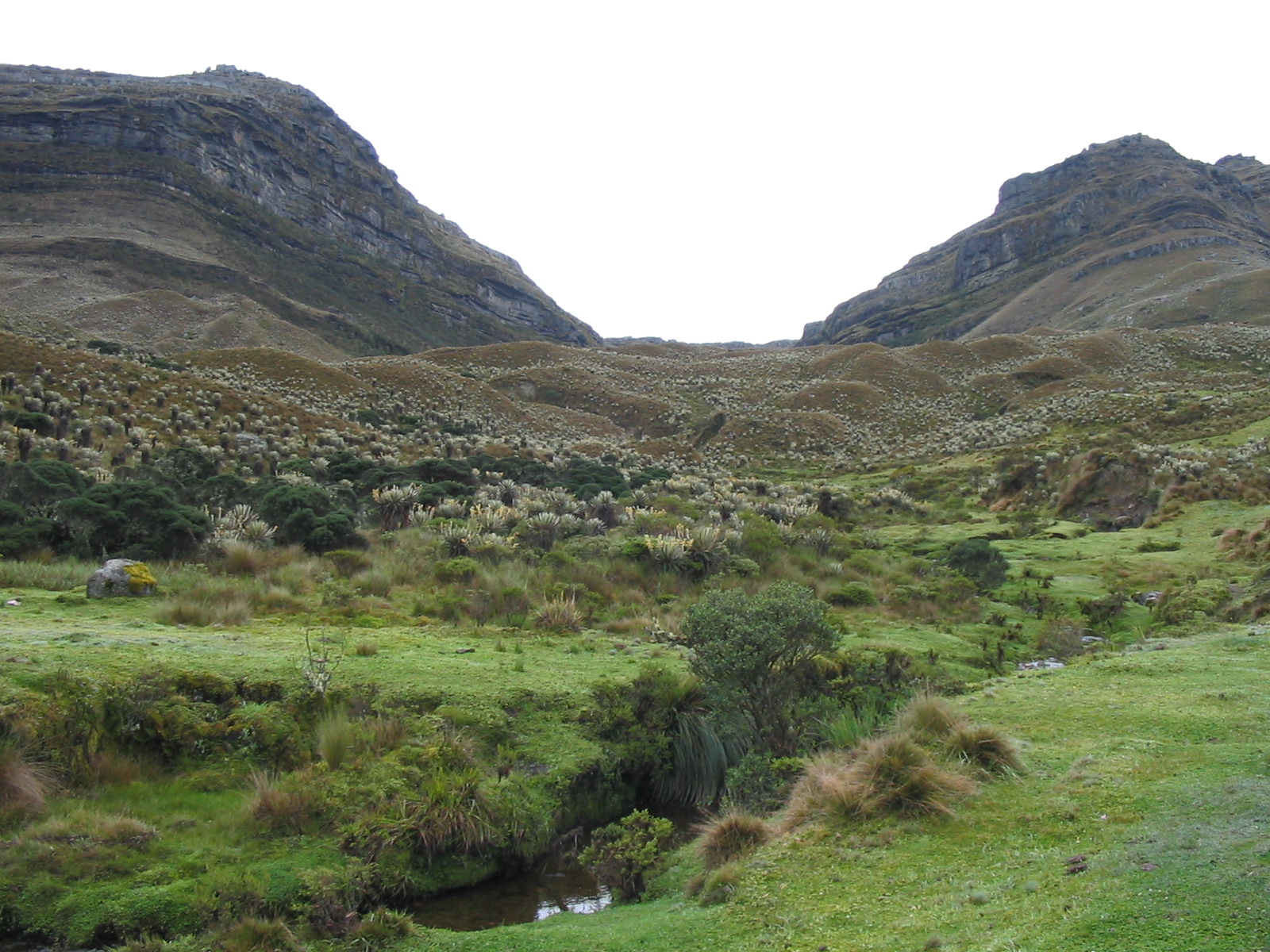
- Páramo de Sumapaz is the largest páramo ecosystem worldwide
- Interactive map of Páramo de Sumapaz
- Location: Cundinamarca
- Nearest city: Bogotá
- Coordinates: 4°25′N 74°6′W
- Area: 178,000 ha (440,000 acres)
- Established: 1977
- Governing body: SINAP

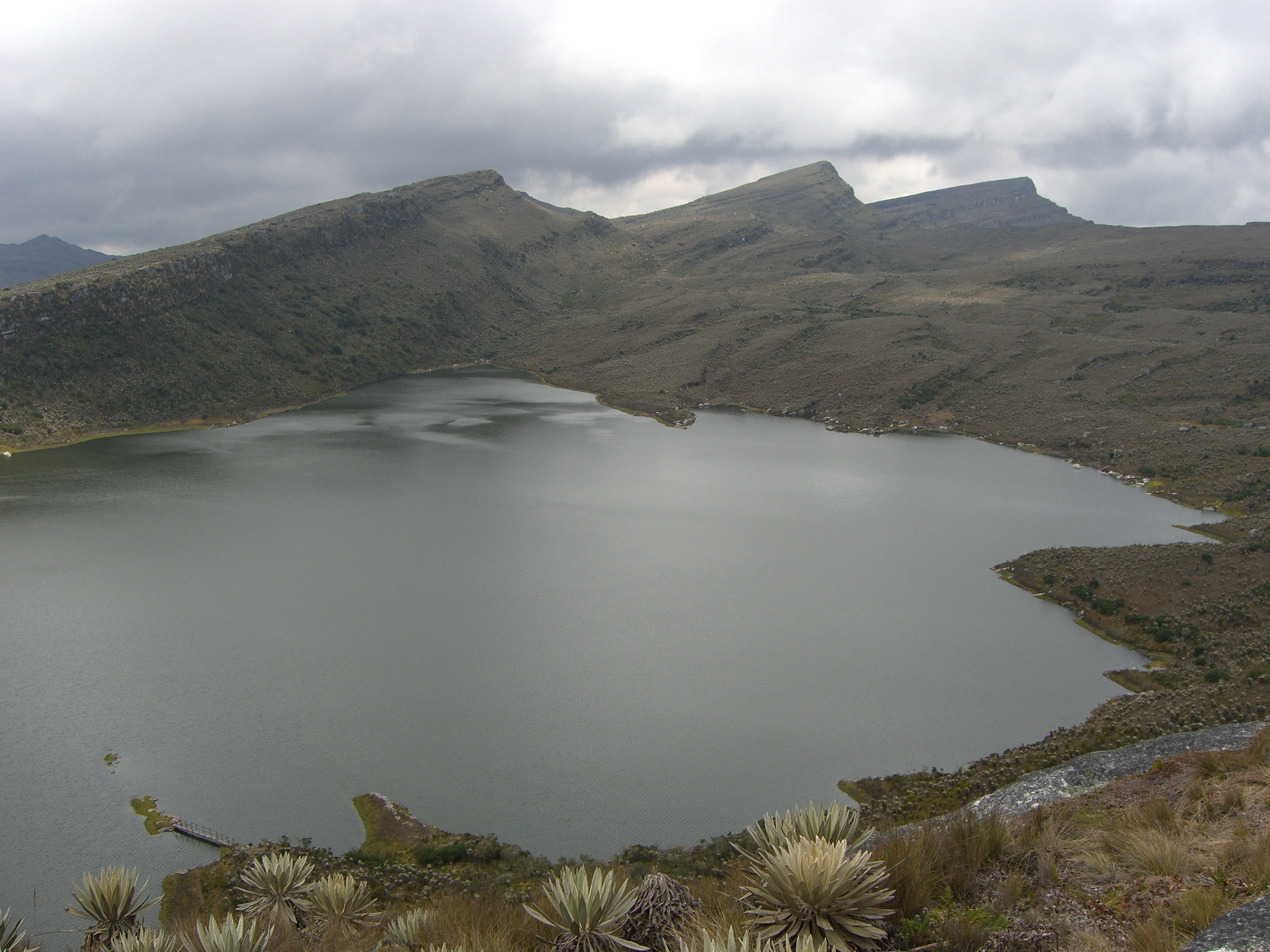
Chisaca Lake at Sumapaz was formed by glacial moraines deposited in a cirque from a glacier that retreated after the end of the Santa María glaciation

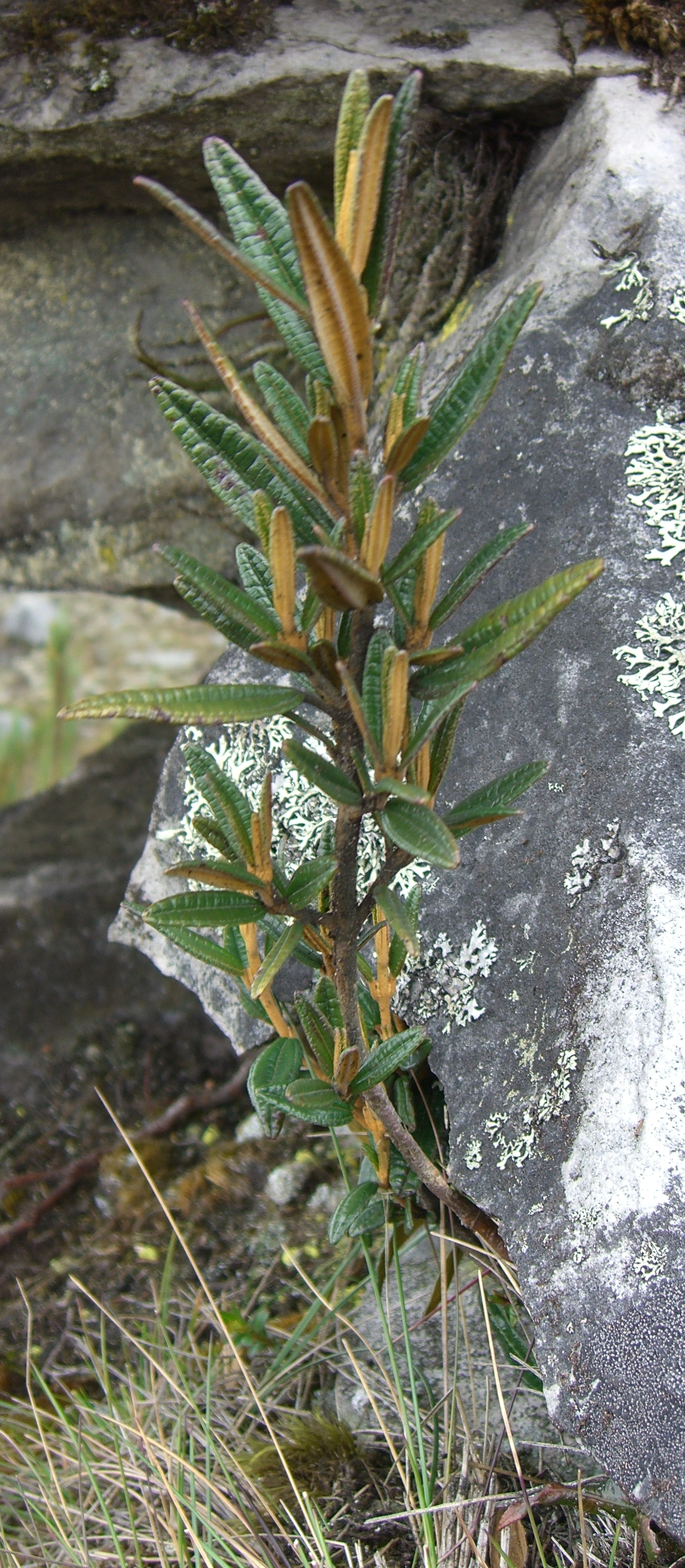
Miconia salicifolia

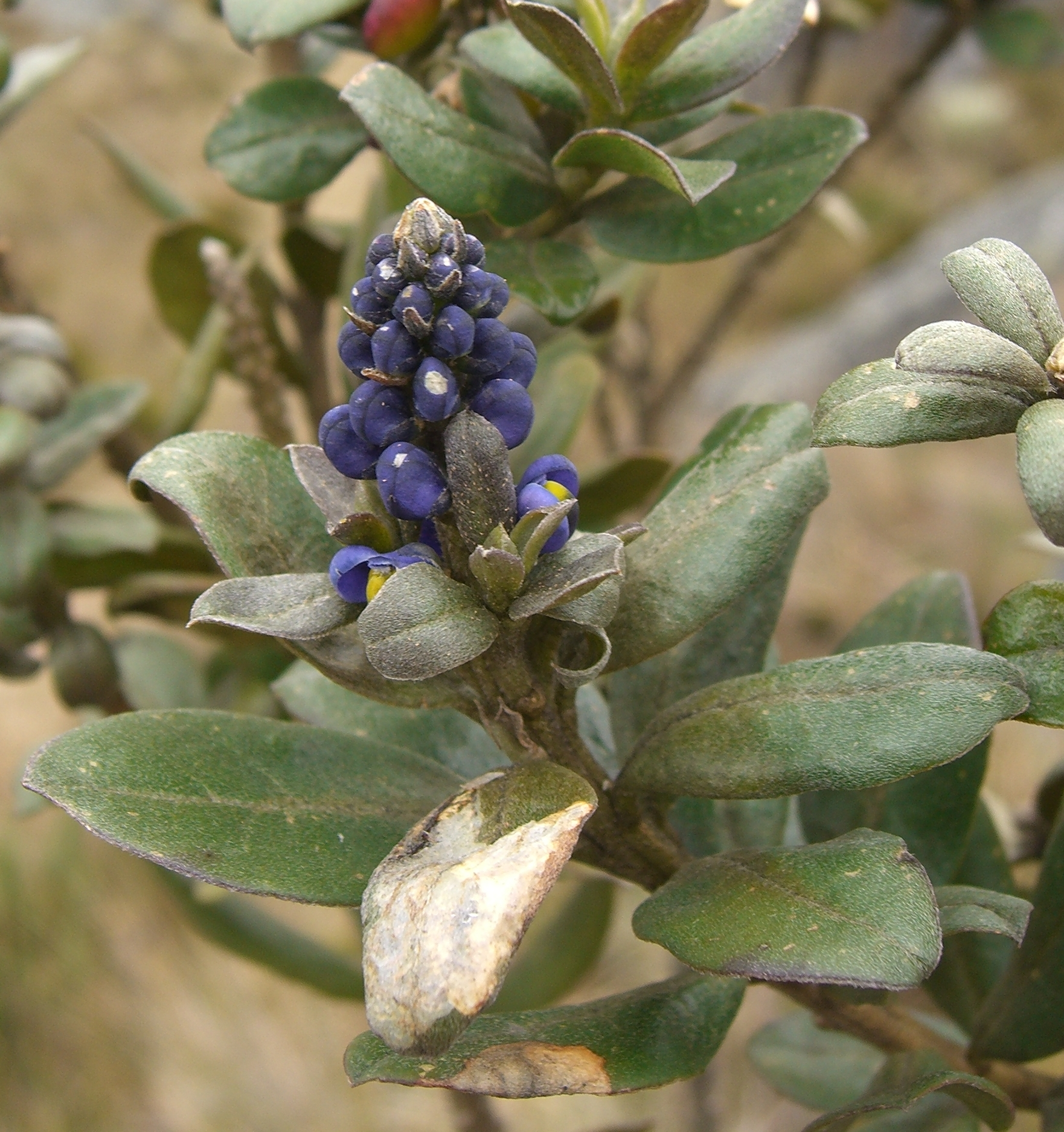
Monnina salicifolia

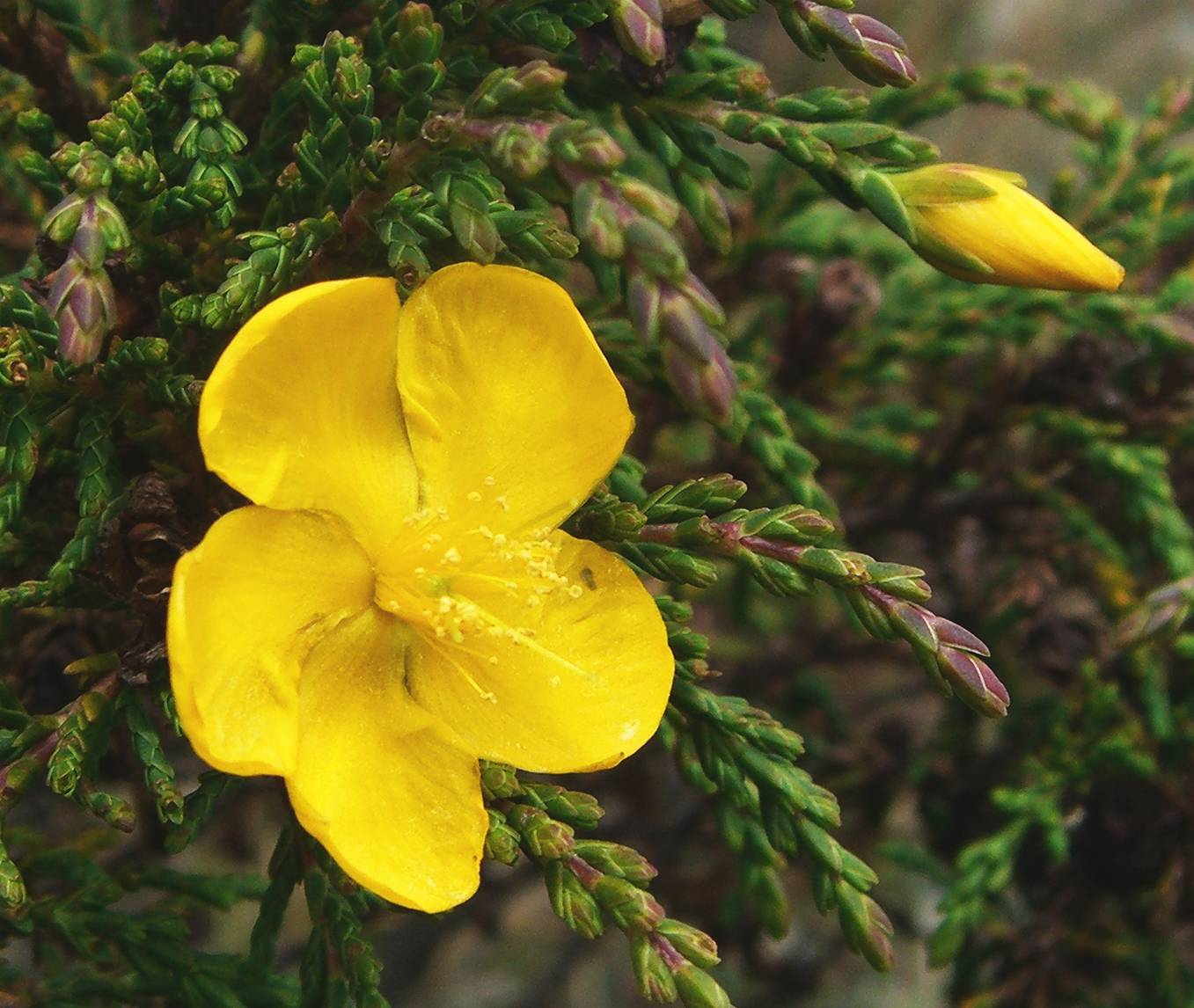
Hypericum myricariifolium

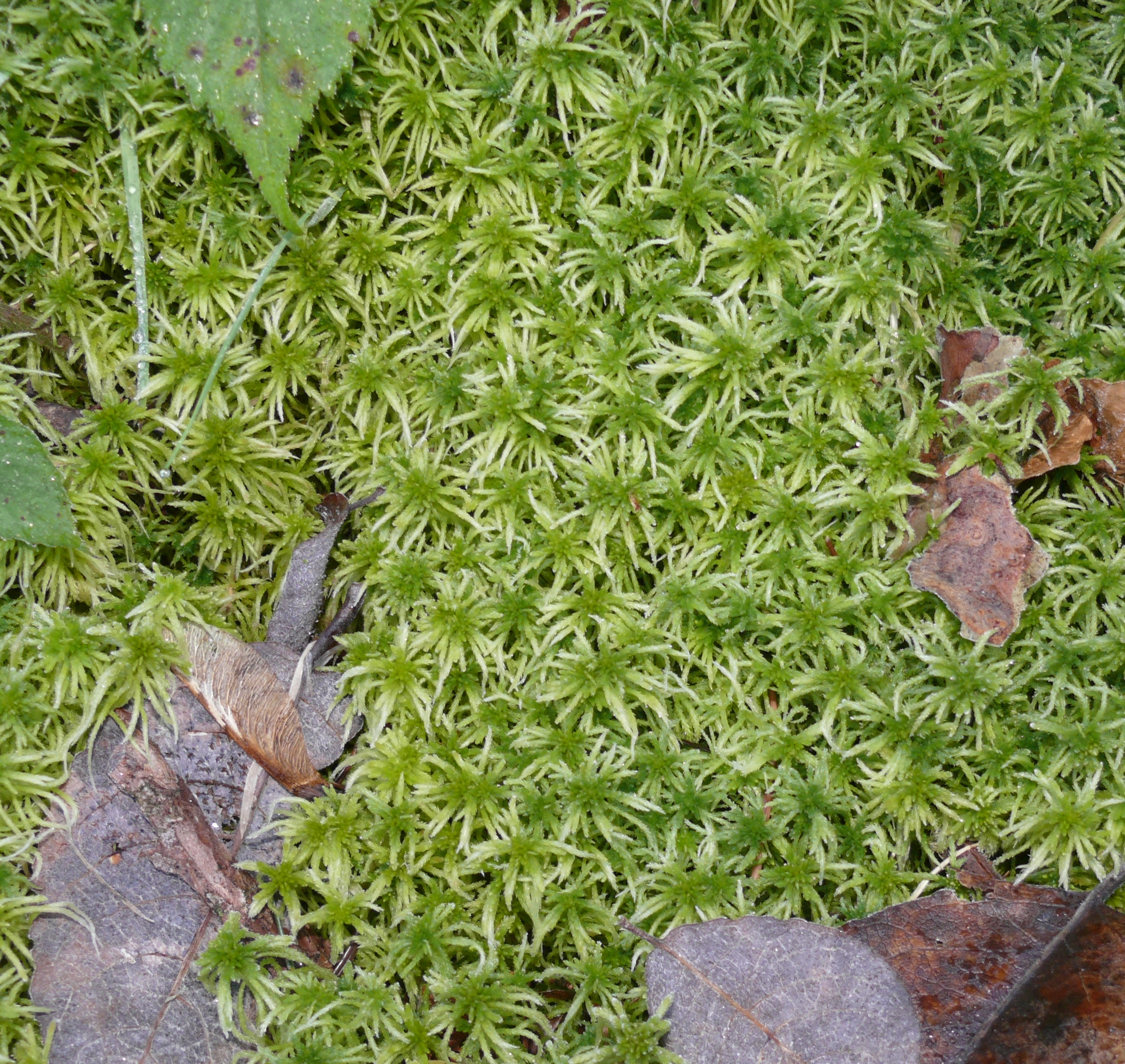
Cushion of sphagnum moss

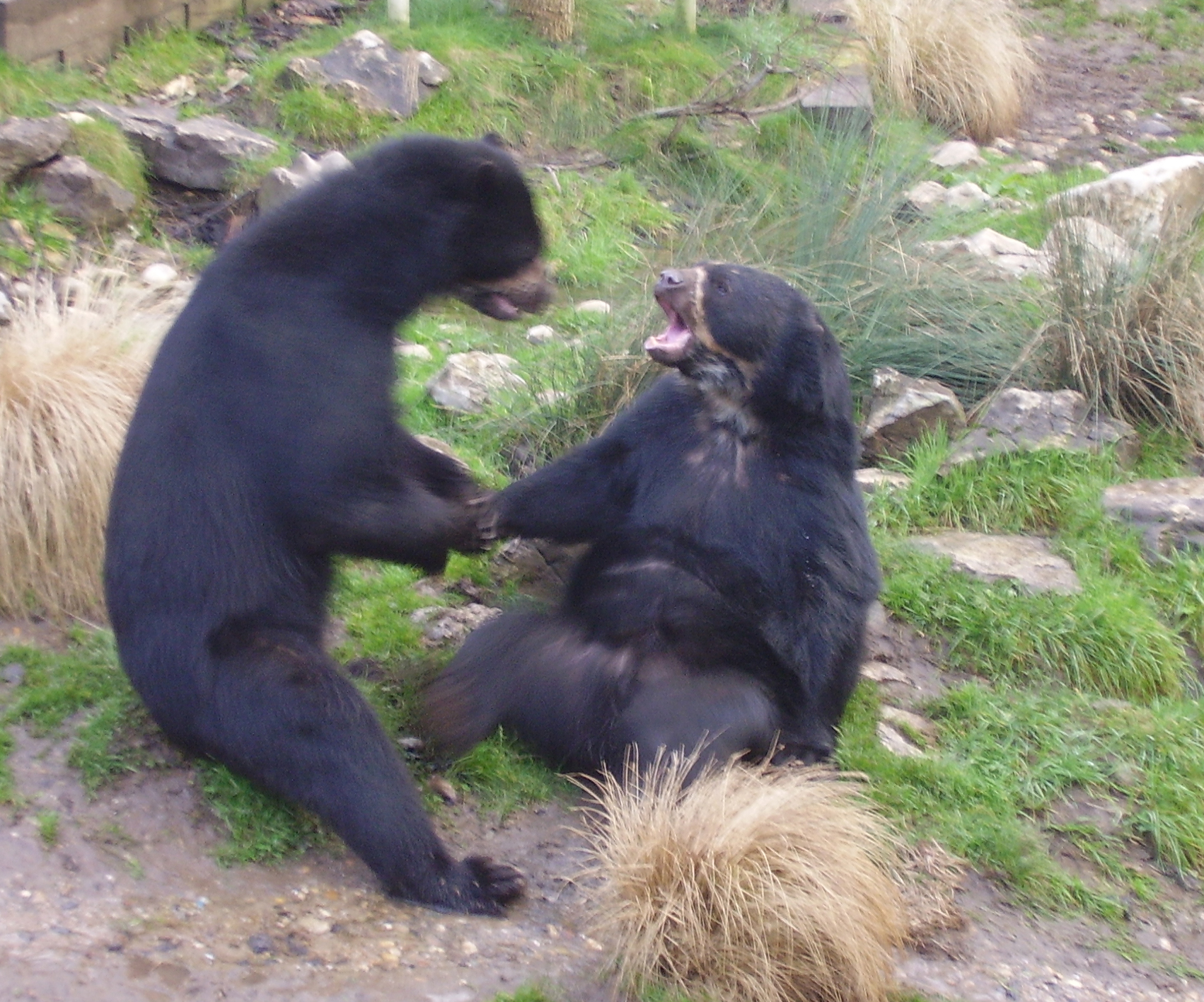
Spectacled bears

Sumapaz Páramo (Spanish: Páramo de Sumapaz - meaning "Utterly peaceful moorland") is a large páramo ecosystem located in the Altiplano Cundiboyacense mountain range, considered the largest páramo ecosystem in the world. It was declared a National Park of Colombia in 1977 because of its importance as a biodiversity hotspot and main source of water for the most densely populated area of the country, the Bogotá savanna.

== History ==
Sumapaz Páramo was considered a sacred place for the Muisca indigenous people. It was associated with the divine forces of creation and the origin of mankind, a domain where humans were not supposed to enter.

During the 16th century, German adventurer and conquistador Nikolaus Federmann conducted an expedition crossing the Sumapaz, searching for El Dorado mythic treasure, with heavy casualties, where men, both Spaniards and indigenous, and horses, died of cold. The place was named by the Spaniards "País de la Niebla" ("Country of Fog") because of the dense clouds at ground level, with great decrease in visibility.

In 1783, José Celestino Mutis led the Botanic Expedition, with the purpose of studying the flora and fauna of the region. However, the páramo was not visited because of its harsh climatic conditions. The German naturalist Alexander von Humboldt made the first description of the páramo and the local plants in 1799. He also described the presence of glacier valleys and associated the geologic features of the region, comparing them with those seen in the geomorphology of the Alps.

During the early 20th century, the Spanish naturalist José Cuatrecasas made important research of the páramo and the tree line. Other scientists that described and studied Sumapaz páramo were Ernesto Guhl, who conducted a long-term 3-decade research of the vegetal communities, and Thomas van der Hammen.

== Climate and geography ==
Sumapaz Páramo has an inhospitable, cold climate with temperatures averaging below 10 °C (50 °F).(ranging from −10 °C to 17 °C) with quick changes from short periods of warm climate to freezing cold. The average altitude oscillates between 3500 and 4000 m. AMSL. The highest point is the Nevado del Sumapaz peak (4306 m AMSL). The precipitation is about 700–1000 mm/year. The rainy season lasts almost the entire year, except from December to February, when the sunlight reaches a peak, with intense ultraviolet radiation (adaptations such as white, glassy coloration help the local plants to survive). The humidity is usually high, (from 50 to 90%), and the ground remains soaked, and covered by shallow bodies of water and sticky mud, often covered with dense, flat vegetation difficult to spot by the inexperienced visitor, with danger of falling into them, and risk of drowning or other injuries. These places are called "Chupaderos" or "Chucuas" ("Drainages").

Sumapaz lies between the Orinoco River basin and the Magdalena River basin, the two main fluvial systems of Colombia, and provides tributaries to both. All but one of the tributaries of the Sumapaz River originate in the páramo. Its location on the Thermal equator generates high rates of precipitation, which together with its endemic flora that regulate the soil moisture acting like sponges for the rain waters, contribute to the high amount of surface water and its role as source of water reservoirs.

== Geology ==
The eastern part of Sumapaz consists of Devonian metamorphic rock formations, with fault scarped configuration, and alpine landscapes. Its western part consists of Oligocene sedimentary rocks, with softer landscapes. The different stages of the Quaternary glaciation left plenty of glacier debris, and glacier lakes such as Chisaca lake. During the Last Glacial Maximum, the glacier motion of the ice sheets through the Tunjuelo valley reached as far as Usme (today part of Bogotá).

== Soil ==
The soil of this region is acidic, with high levels of sodium and potassium. This is a coarse-grained soil, with high permeability favoring the formation of groundwater in aquifers. The composition of the soil and the low temperatures contribute to the low amount of humus and poor decomposing of the organic matter making this soil largely unsuitable for agriculture.

== Flora ==
Over 200 species of vascular plants are native to the area with substantial amount of endemisms. The most representative plants of the area are the Espeletias. Several species have been described here, the most common being Espeletia grandiflora Humb. & Bonpl. The largest one is Espeletia uribei Cuatrec., with specimens up to 12 meters of height, other species are: Espeletia algodonosa Aristeg. Espeletia banksiifolia Sch.Bip. & Ettingsh. ex Wedd. Espeletia cuatrecasasii Ruíz-Terán & López-Fig. Espeletia formosa S.Díaz & Rodr.-Cabeza Espeletia glossophylla Mattf. Espeletia killipii Cuatrec. Espeletia picnophyla Cuatrec. Espeletia schultzii (Benth.) W.M.Curtis and Espeletia curialensis Cuatrec. The Sphagnum moss covers wide areas of Sumapaz, which increases the soil's capacity to hold water and nutrients by increasing capillary forces and cation exchange capacity. In the canyons areas, encenillo tree and tibouchina are the dominant species. The European plant Digitalis purpurea is an introduced species, the way of its introduction is not known, either deliberate or accidental.

== Fauna ==
The endangered spectacled bear lives in Sumapaz, its main source of food being the Puya boyacana fruits and the Espeletia plant stems, (known as caulirosule). Other animals described are: Little Red Brocket Deer, tapir, coati, golden eagle, torrent duck, Páramo duck (Anas georgica). An introduced species in the waterbodies is the rainbow trout.

== Socio-economic issues ==
Although the soil and climate are adverse for agriculture and other economic activities, human settlements do exist in the Sumapaz Páramo, including the villages of San Juan de Sumapaz, Nazareth, Santa Rosa and El Hato (only the first two have road access) with an estimated 1200 families, most of them under the poverty threshold, living on less than $1.25 per day, without schools or sanitation. In consequence, the peasants often invade the protected area to grow potato crops. The natural forest line is severely altered by human activity (logging, intensive grazing), which makes the difference between natural and artificial grasslands difficult to distinguish. An estimated 10,000 heads of cattle live or feed within the protected area. In 1950, president Mariano Ospina Pérez ordered the Colombian banks not to approve loans destined to establishment of crops or cattle at altitudes higher than 3,500 metres (11,500 ft) as an attempt to discourage such activities.

Illegal armed groups such as FARC and ELN guerrillas used the area in recent years as a corridor for the transportation of kidnapping victims, weapon trafficking and drug trafficking. The Colombian government, in accordance with democratic security policies, established a center of military operations in 2002: the General Antonio Arredondo Military base, achieving the withdrawal of the illegal forces. However, the presence of the Colombian army has generated controversy over the environmental impact, with alleged destruction of the frailejones, whose leaves are supposedly collected by the soldiers for making rudimentary mattresses to sleep on.

== See also ==
- Ocetá Páramo
- Chingaza National Natural Park
