= Matina District =

District in Matina canton, Limón province, Costa Rica

Matina
- District
- Interactive map of Matina
- Matina district location in Costa Rica
- Coordinates: 9.9850086°N 83.2895294°W
- Country: Costa Rica
- Province: Limón
- Canton: Matina
- Creation: 24 June 1969

Area
  - Total: 351.75 km^{2} (135.81 sq mi)
- Elevation: 11 m (36 ft)

Population (2011)
  - Total: 9,142
  - Density: 25.99/km^{2} (67.31/sq mi)

Matina is a district of the Matina canton, in the Limón province of Costa Rica.

== History ==
In 1747 the main fort (Fuerte de San Fernando de Matina) was captured by British Baymen and Miskito Sambus from the Mosquito Coast - the Cacao rich area was subsequently ravaged. Matina was created on 24 June 1969 by Ley 4344.

== Geography ==
Matina has an area of 351.75 square kilometres (135.81 sq mi) and an elevation of eleven metres (36 ft).

== Demographics ==
For the 2011 census, Matina had a population of 9142 inhabitants.
