= Sumapaz River =

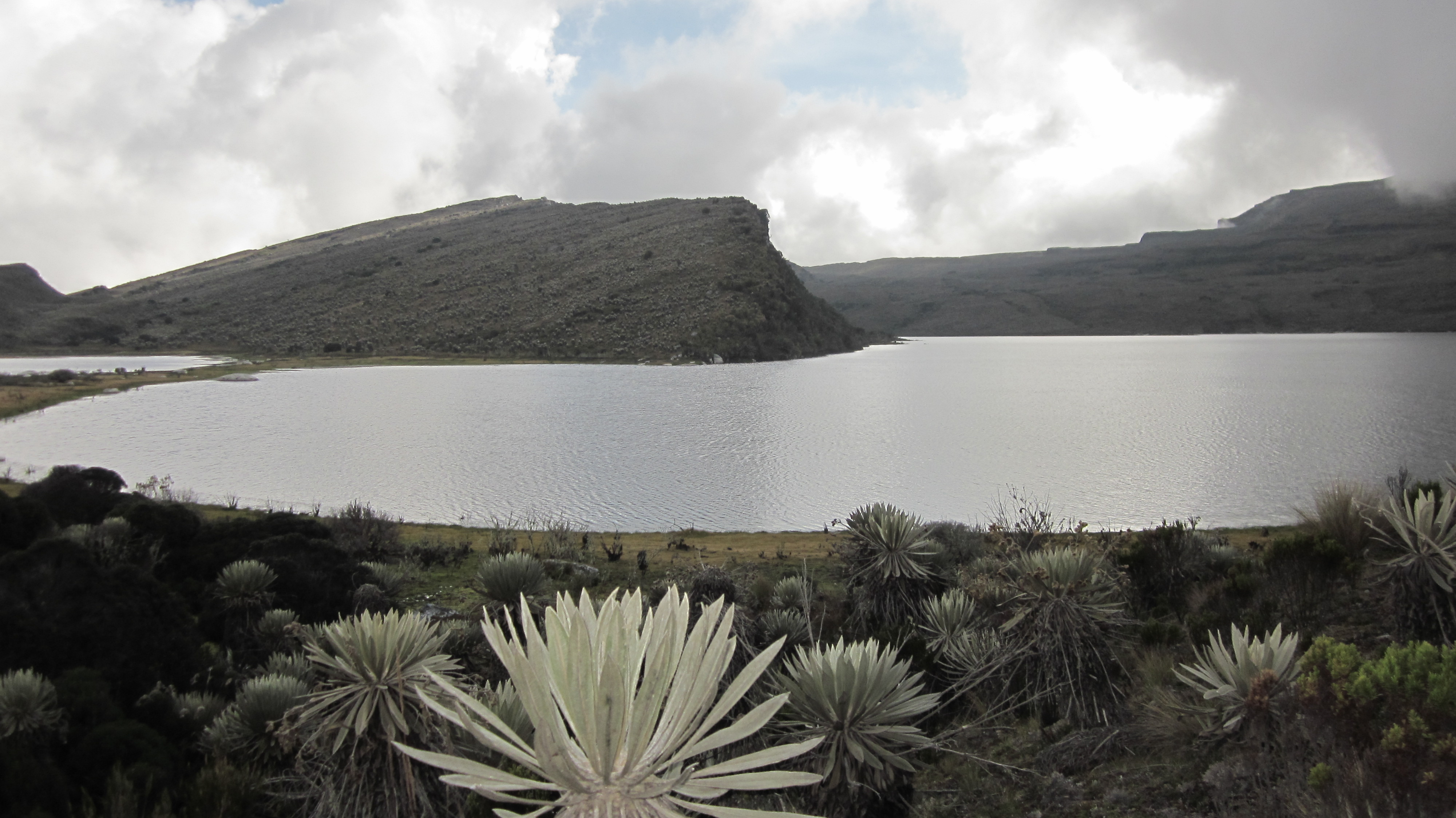
- Lake Chisacá, source of the river

- Source location in Colombia
- Native name: Río Sumapaz (Spanish)

Location
- Country: Colombia

Physical characteristics
- Source
  - location: Lake Chisacá, Sumapaz Páramo
  - coordinates: 4°16′51″N 74°12′25.4″W
  - elevation: 4,710 m (15,450 ft)
- Mouth
  - location: Ricaurte
  - coordinates: 4°15′51″N 74°46′50″W
  - elevation: 289 m (948 ft)
- Length: 95 km (59 mi)
- Basin size: 480 km^{2} (190 sq mi)

Basin features
- River system: Magdalena River; Caribbean Sea
- Tributaries
  - left: Pilar River, San Juan River, Cuja River, Panches River

The Sumapaz River (Spanish: Río Sumapaz) is a major tributary of the Magdalena River in Colombia. The 95 kilometres (59 mi) long river originates in the Eastern Ranges of the Colombian Andes at the largest páramo in the world; Sumapaz, of which it takes its name. It forms the natural boundary between the departments of Cundinamarca and Tolima.

== Course ==
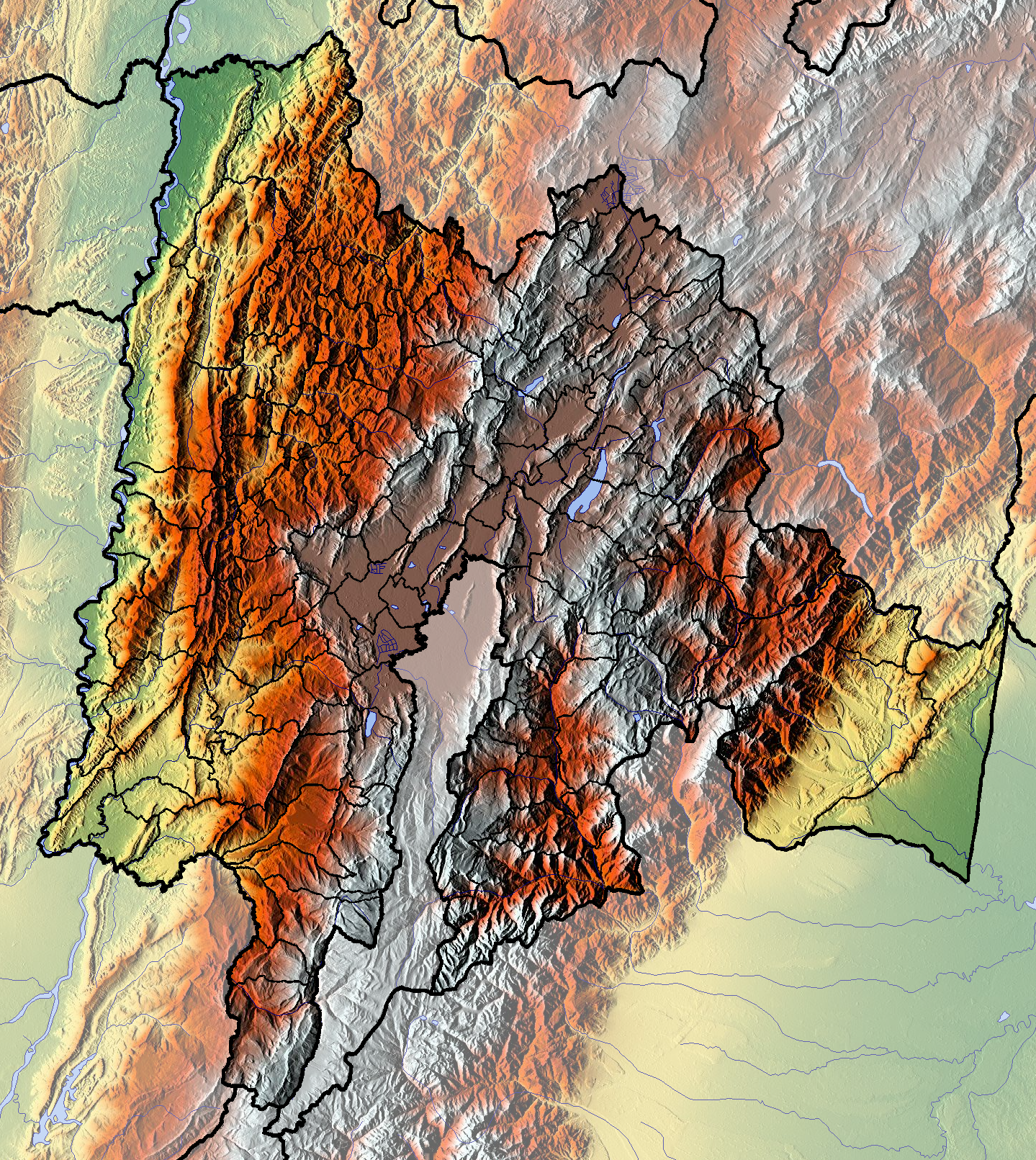
Source and mouth of the Sumapaz River in Cundinamarca

The Sumapaz River flows through the Magdalena Valley montane forests ecoregion in its upper reaches. The Sumapaz River flows through the department of Cundinamarca. It takes its name from its place of birth in the Sumapaz Páramo, the largest páramo in the world, in the rural zone of Bogotá. It is one of the main tributaries of the upper course of the Magdalena River

In ancient times, it was known as the Fusagasugá River, with a length of 200 kilometres (120 mi). The lower reaches of the Fusagasugá River become the Sumapaz after the confluence of the Chocho and Cuja. The river and its tributaries, the Gobernador, Bejucal, San Juan, Negro, Guavio, Batán, Juan Viejo, Corrales, Bosque, Colorado, Barroblanco, Subia or Chocho, Panches and Pagüey all originate in the Sumapaz and San Fortunato páramos, apart from the Pagüey. The Fusagasugá valley is known for its pleasant climate and the surrounding hills. There was a 100 square kilometres (39 sq mi) Fusagasugá Lagoon, which probably drained through the Melgar Valley. The river crosses the municipalities of Cabrera, Venecia, Pandi, Icononzo, Nilo, Melgar and Ricaurte. It forms the natural boundary between the departments of Tolima and Cundinamarca.

== Physical and natural aspects ==
The Sumapaz River can be divided into three sections: source, middle and lower valley. The source is in the Sumapaz Páramo, the world's largest páramo, and one of the most important sources of water, supplying the southern part of the Cundinamarca and important towns in the Tolima department. The middle course of the river drops from 4,710 to 289 metres (15,453 to 948 ft) above sea level before reaching the lower valley formed by the river in the municipality of Melgar, which extends to its mouth on the Magdalena River in the municipality of Ricaurte.

== Tourism ==
The municipalities of Pandi, Melgar and Ricaurte are in the lower valley. These hold vacation spots for the people of the capital of Colombia, Bogotá, drawn by the warm climate and important tourist sites and hotels. In recent years, adventure sports like river rafting have become popular.

The Icononzo natural bridge is an important natural attraction, a geological formation of great beauty and complexity that was once visited by the German naturalist Alexander von Humboldt and that was once considered one of the hundred natural wonders of the world.

== Future hydroelectric project ==
Since 2010, the power generation company Emgesa, a subsidiary of the Italian company Enel, has been conducting pre-feasibility and feasibility studies for construction of eight small hydroelectric power plants along the 50 kilometres (31 mi) stretch of the Sumapaz between the mouth of the San Juan River and the Las Lajas gorge, in the municipalities of Cabrera, Venice and Pandi in the department of Cundinamarca, and the municipality of Icononzo in Tolima.

== See also ==
- List of rivers of Colombia
