= Gurmeet Kaur (writer) =

Indian-American writer

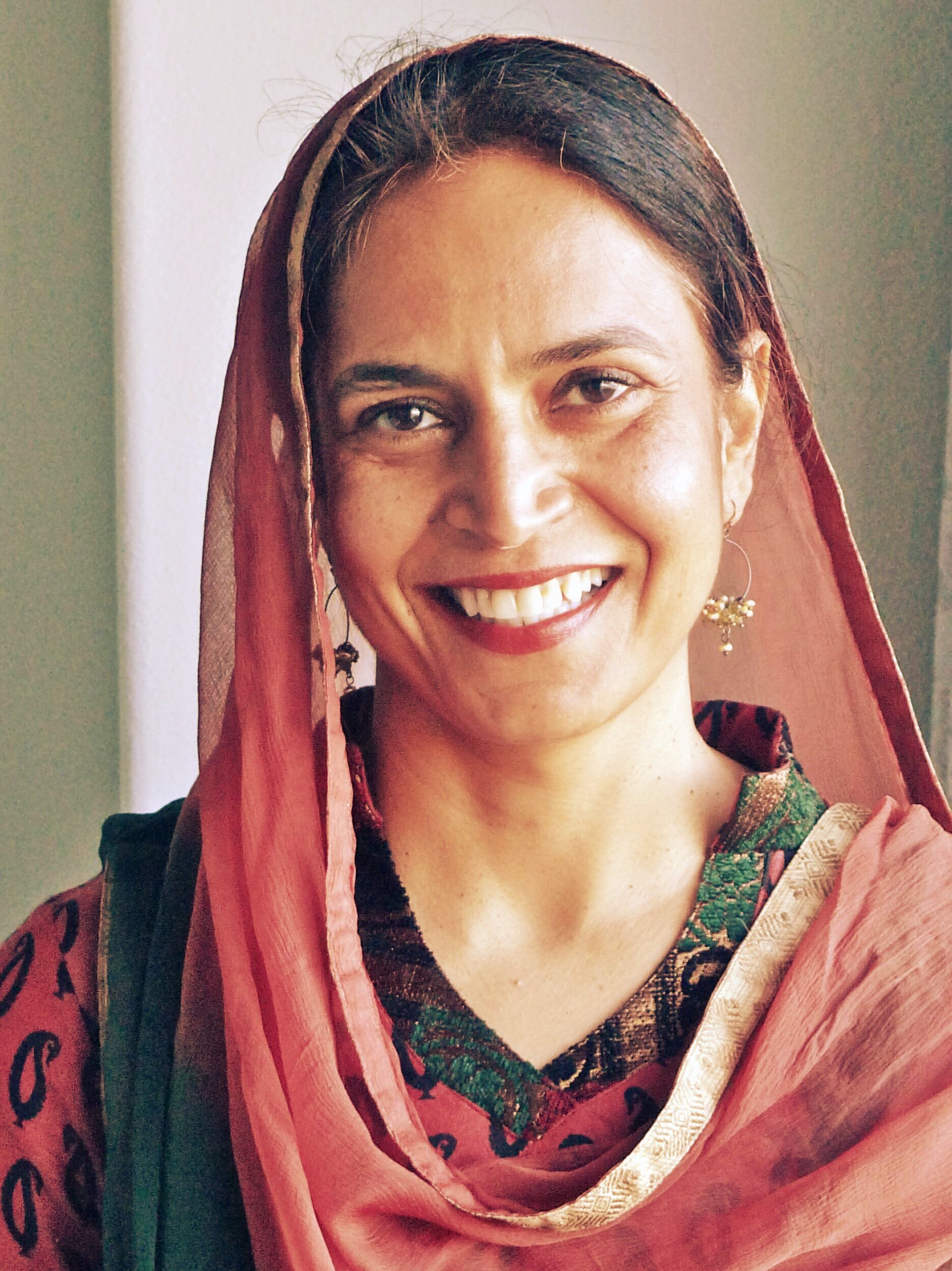
- Born: Kanpur, Uttar Pradesh India
- Occupations: Writer, publisher

Gurmeet Kaur is an Indian-born American writer and publisher known for creating a series of children's books under the project Fascinating Folktales of Punjab.

== Biography ==
=== Early life and professional career ===
Gurmeet was born in Kanpur, Uttar Pradesh, India and has ancestral roots in Jhelum and Bannu, British India (now Pakistan). She grew up in Indore, Madhya Pradesh and migrated to the US after surviving the 1984 anti-Sikh riots.

She lives in Atlanta, Georgia and worked as an engineer and a software architect for 25 years. She left her job in 2016 and dedicated herself to promoting the Punjabi language.

=== Fascinating Folktales of Punjab ===
She started publishing children's books in 2012. In 2012–13, she published the first set of three books; ChiDi tay Pippal (The Sparrow and the Pippal), ChiDi tay Kaañ (The Sparrow and the Crow), and Lailaa tay Dhol (The Lamb and the Dhol).

In 2018, she published the Undivided Punjab Edition which included illustrations, and text in both the Gurmukhi and the Shahmukhi scripts of Punjabi, along with English. She has also been creating audio versions of the folktales.

=== The Valiant - Jaswant Singh Khalra ===
In 2020, she wrote and published a book about Jaswant Singh Khalra in order to commemorate his 25th martyrdom.

=== Activism ===
She has been campaigning for the preservation of heritage at Kartarpur Sahib, where Guru Nanak spent his final years.

== Personal life ==
She is married and is a mother of two children. Her son Angad Singh works at Vice News. Her daughter Liv Kaur has also participated in storytelling sessions along with her.

== Works ==
- ChiDi tay Pippal (The Sparrow and the Pippal) - 2012-13
- ChiDi tay Kaañ (The Sparrow and the Crow) - 2012-13
- Lailaa tay Dhol (The Lamb and the Dhol) - 2012-13
- Jatt tay Ghuggee (Farmer and the Dove) - 2014
- BhukhhaD KeeDee (The Very Hungry Ant) - 2014
- KukkaD da Viah (The Rooster's Wedding) - 2016
- Baataañ: Choohay Tay Sapp Diaañ (Tales of the Mouse and the Snake) - 2016
- Do Baataañ: To’tay Tay Lillhaañ (Tales of the Parrots and the Berries) - 2016
- Fascinating Folktales of Punjab (1-5) - Undivided Punjab Edition - 2018
- The Valiant - Jaswant Singh Khalra - 2020
- Marjeewada - Jaswant Singh Khalra - 2020
