= Population and housing censuses by country =

This is a list of national population and housing censuses.

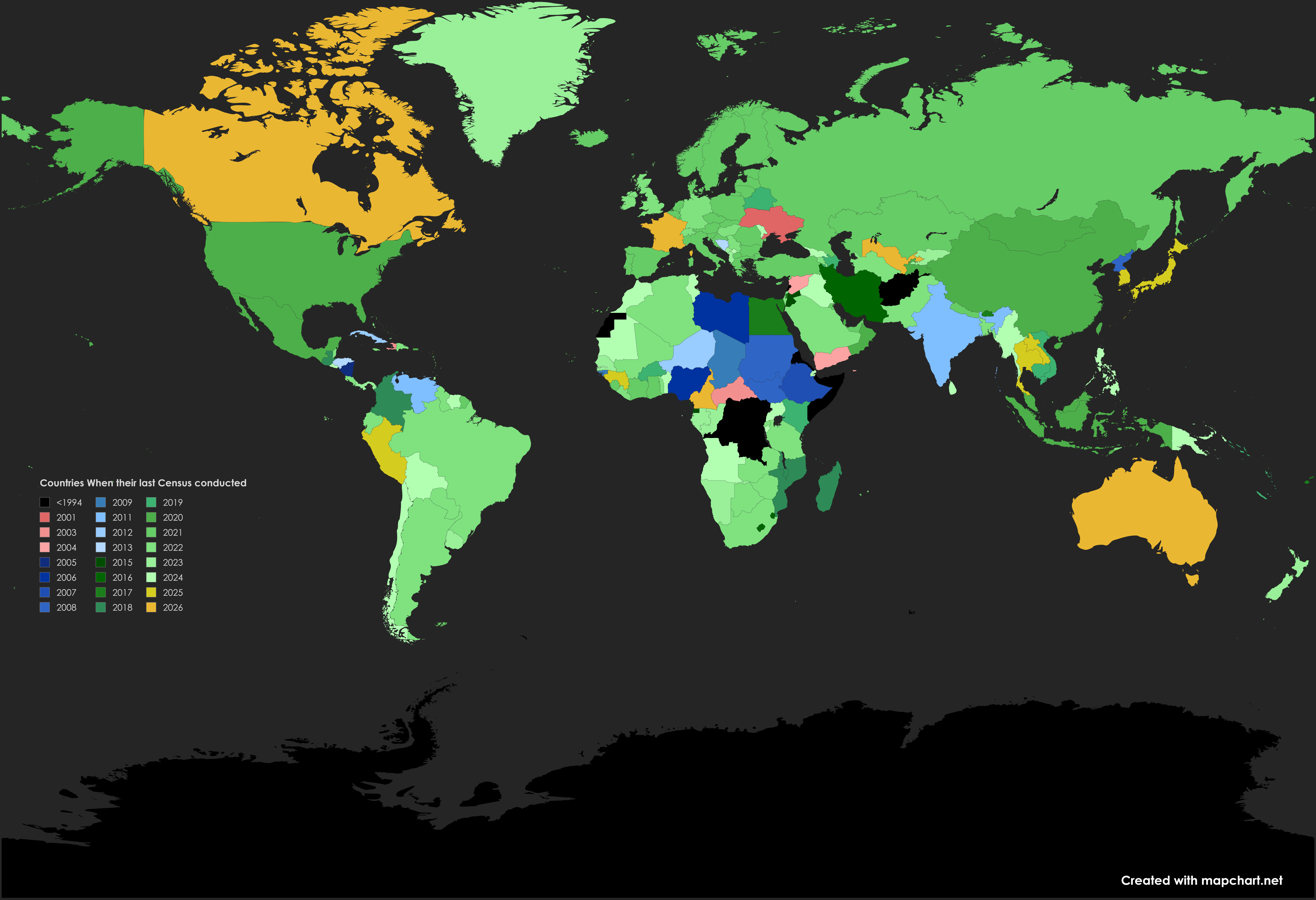
World map showing countries' most recent censuses as of 2025

== Census advisory ==
The United Nations recommends a census enumeration at least once every ten years, and once every five years for even better data, rather than simply relying on estimates and projections alone. Complications to carrying out a census include tribal conflict, war, borders not demarcated, budget, inexperience, political snags, lack of manpower, and poor geographic information systems. A number of nations have not carried them out once a decade. It is not uncommon for a scheduled census to be deferred or delayed.

Lebanon has not held a census since 1932. Afghanistan is closing in on five decades without a census. DRC and Uzbekistan stand out as not having a census since before 1990. Eritrea has only had one as a part of Ethiopia in the 1990s.

== Methods of conducting population census ==
More countries are switching to using administrative data to hold a census. This allows a simulated census to be conducted by linking several different administrative databases at an agreed time.

Using administrative data/combined data	Using collected data
Netherlands, Norway, Sweden, Switzerland, Denmark, Finland	United Kingdom, United States, Japan

== Africa ==
=== Algeria ===
Population and housing censuses have been carried out in Algeria in 1966, 1977, 1987, 1998, 2008, and 2020.

Map of Algeria in Africa

Algerian flag

Coat of arms of Algeria

Demographic and historical evolution of the Algerian population since the first official census carried out in 1966.
N.	Year	Population Algeria	Population and Housing Census
20th century
1st	1966	▲11,908,000	1966 Algerian census
2nd	1977	▲16,948,000	1977 Algerian census
3rd	1987	▲23,038,942	1987 Algerian census
4th	1998	▲29,100,867	1998 Algerian census
21st century
5th	2008	▲34,080,030	2008 Algerian census

=== Angola ===
General censuses of population and housing (Portuguese: Recenseamento Geral da População e Habitação (RGPH)) were carried out in 1970 and 2014. The 1970 census counted 5,646,166 habitants. The 2014 census counted 25,789,024 habitants as of May 16, 2014.

Map of Angola in Africa

Angola flag

Coat of arms of Angola

Demographic and historical evolution of the Angolan population since the first official census carried out in 1970.
N.	Year	Population Angola	Population and Housing Census
20th century
1st	1970	▲5,646,166	1970 Angolan census
21st century
2nd	2014	▲25,789,024	2014 Angolan census
3rd	2024	▲36,604,681	2024 Angolan census

=== Benin ===
Population and housing censuses have been carried out in 1978, 1992, 2002 and 2013. 2013 census preliminary results have been published. Final results were published in 2015.

=== Botswana ===
Censuses in Botswana are run by the Statistics Botswana (formerly Central Statistics Office). There have been twelve censuses in Botswana's history. The most recent occurred in April 2022.

=== Burkina Faso ===
The Institut National de la Statistique et de la Demographie has conducted four censuses: in 1975, 1985, 1996, 2006 and 2019.

Map of Burkina Faso in Africa

Burkinabe flag

Coat of arms of Burkina Faso

Demographic and historical evolution of the Burkinabé population since the first official census carried out in 1975.
N.	Year	Population Burkina Faso	Population and Housing Census
20th century
1st	1975	▲5,638,203	1975 Burkinabe census
2nd	1985	▲7,964,705	1985 Burkinabe census
3rd	1996	▲10,312,609	1996 Burkinabe census
21st century
4th	2006	▲14,017,262	2006 Burkinabe census
5th	2019	▲20,505,155	2019 Burkinabe census

=== Congo (DRC) ===
The first and so far only census conducted in DR Congo dates from 1984.

=== Egypt ===
The Statistical Department of the Ministry of Finance conducted the first census in 1882, which considered as a preparatory step; the first true population census was conducted in 1897. Thereafter, censuses were conducted at ten-year intervals in 1907, 1917, 1927 and so on. The last one being in 2017.

Map of Egypt in Africa

Egyptian flag

Coat of arms of Egypt

Demographic and historical evolution of the Egyptian population since the first official census carried out in 1882
N.	Year	Population Egypt	Population and Housing Census
19th century
1st	1882	6,806,381	1882 Egyptian census
2nd	1897	▲9,734,405	1897 Egyptian census
20th century
3rd	1907	▲11,189,978	1907 Egyptian census
4th	1917	▲12,716,255	1917 Egyptian census
5th	1927	▲14,177,864	1927 Egyptian census
6th	1937	▲15,921,000	1937 Egyptian census
7th	1947	▲18,967,000	1947 Egyptian census
8th	1960	▲26,085,000	1960 Egyptian census
9th	1966	▲30,076,000	1966 Egyptian census
10th	1976	▲36,626,000	1976 Egyptian census
11th	1986	▲48,205,049	1986 Egyptian census
12th	1996	▲59,276,672	1996 Egyptian census
21st century
13th	2006	▲72,798,031	2006 Egyptian census
14th	2017	▲94,798,827	2017 Egyptian census
Steady	2026	▲109,191,585	Estimates

=== Ethiopia ===
Three censuses have been taken in Ethiopia: 1984, 1994 and in 2007. The responsible institution is the Central Statistical Agency. Most of the census in 2007 was taken in August, while the Somali Region and the Afar Region were not covered. The northern Afar region is a remote, hot and arid area. The eastern Somali region (Ogaden) hosts a large nomadic Somali population and is a conflict area where Ethiopian regular forces are fighting against Ogaden National Liberation Front (ONLF).

=== Ivory Coast ===
Four general censuses of population and housing (French: Recensement Général de la Population et de l'Habitat (RGPH)) have been carried out in, the latest ones being in 1998 and 2014.

Map of Ivory Coast in Africa

Ivorian flag

Coat of arms of Ivory Coast

Demographic and historical evolution of the Ivorian population since the first official census carried out in 1975.
N.	Year	Population Ivory Coast	Population and Housing Census
20th century
1st	1975	▲6,709,600	1975 Ivorian census
2nd	1988	▲10,815,694	1988 Ivorian census
3rd	1998	▲15,366,672	1998 Ivorian census
21st century
4th	2014	▲22,671,331	2014 Ivorian census
5th	2021	▲29,389,150	2021 Ivorian census

=== Kenya ===
The first census in Kenya was conducted in 1948, when Kenya was still a colony administered by the British. Since 1969 census has been taken every ten years. The last census, overseen by the Kenya National Bureau of Statistics, was in 2019 and recorded a population of 47.6 million.

Map of Kenya in Africa

Kenyan flag

Coat of arms of Kenya

Demographic and historical evolution of the Kenyan population since the first official census carried out in 1969.
N.	Year	Population Kenya	Population and Housing Census
20th century
1st	1969	10,942,705	1969 Kenyan census
2nd	1979	▲15,327,061	1979 Kenyan census
3rd	1989	▲21,443,636	1989 Kenyan census
4th	1999	▲28,686,607	1999 Kenyan census
21st century
5th	2009	▲38,610,097	2009 Kenyan census
6th	2019	▲47,564,296	2019 Kenyan census
Steady	2025	▲53,330,978	Estimates

=== Libya ===
Libya's last census was carried out in 2006.It showed a population of 5.657.692 people.

=== Madagascar ===
Madagascar had its latest census in 2018, the third census to be conducted. It recorded a total resident population of 25,674,186 inhabitants.

=== Mauritius ===
Population and housing censuses for Mauritius was collected in 1972, 1983, 2000, and 2011; although respondents were asked to identify their race/ethnic origin in the 1972 census, this question was dropped from the following censuses because "the government felt that it was a divisive question". The Statistics Act directed that all official censuses be conducted by Statistics Mauritius, as well as serve as the central depository for this information.

=== Morocco ===
General censuses of population and housing (Arabic: الإحصاء العام للسكان والسكنى / French: Recensement Général de la Population et de l'Habitat (RGPH)) have been carried out since independence in 1960, 1971, 1982, 1994, 2004 and 2014. The 2014 census results will be published on http://rgph-2014.hcp.ma/ by the end of 2014.

Map of Morocco in Africa

Moroccan flag

Coat of arms of Morocco

Demographic and historical evolution of the Moroccan population since the first official census carried out in 1960.
N.	Year	Population Morocco	Population and Housing Census
20th century
1st	1960	11,626,232	1960 Moroccan census
2nd	1971	▲15,321,210	1971 Moroccan census
3rd	1982	▲20,449,551	1982 Moroccan census
4th	1994	▲25,821,571	1994 Moroccan census
21st century
5th	2004	▲29,475,763	2004 Moroccan census
6th	2014	▲33,337,529	2014 Moroccan census
7th	2024	▲36,157,337	2024 Moroccan census

=== Mozambique ===
The first census was taken in 1980. The second in 1997. The third was taken August 1–14, 2007. The fourth and most recent was taken in 2017.

=== Namibia ===
In accordance with the Statistics Act No. 66 of 1976, Namibia conducts a Population and Housing Census every ten years. After independence the first one was carried out in 1991, further rounds followed in 2001 and 2011. In Namibia, the de facto method is used. For enumeration purposes the country is demarcated into 4,042 enumeration areas. These areas do not overlap with constituency boundaries to get reliable data for election purposes as well.

=== Nigeria ===
Population censuses have been taken in Nigeria during colonial time in 1866, 1871, 1896, 1901, 1911, 1921 and 1952. The censuses covered only the southern part of the country except for the 1952 census which was country wide, and the censuses before 1921 were based on administrative estimates rather than on an actual enumeration.

Censuses during independence were taken 1962, 1963, 1973, 1991 and 2006. The results of the 1962 census were considered inaccurate enough that a new census was ordered on February 19, 1963. The results from 1973 and 2006 were highly disputed, but no recounts were taken. The preliminary results for 2006 indicates a population of 140 million people. 700,000 enumerators were engaged in this operation.

=== Rwanda ===
Map of Rwanda in Africa

Rwandan flag

Coat of arms of Rwanda

Demographic and historical evolution of the Rwandan population since the first official census carried out in 1978.
N.	Year	Population Rwanda	Population and Housing Census
20th century
1st	1978	4,831,527	1978 Rwandan census
2nd	1991	▲7,157,551	1991 Rwandan census
21st century
3rd	2002	▲8,128,553	2002 Rwandan census
4th	2012	▲10,515,973	2012 Rwandan census
5th	2022	▲13,246,394	2022 Rwandan census

=== Somalia ===
There has been only one successful census in Somalia, carried out in 1975. The 1986 census remained incomplete, and its results were never published.

=== South Africa ===
Population censuses are conducted by national government agency Stats SA, with the most recent being in 2022.

Stats SA also conducts an annual General Household Survey.

=== Sudan ===
Population censuses have been carried out in Sudan in 1955/56, 1973 (national), 1983 (national) and 1993 (only north). A census was conducted in April 2008. Some areas—namely Darfur, Juba, and Malakal—were difficult to measure.

=== Togo ===
General population and housing censuses were carried out in 1960, 1970, 1981 and 2010.

=== Tunisia ===
General censuses of population and housing (French: Recensement Général de la Population et de l'Habitat (RGPH)) have been carried out in 1921, 1926, 1931, 1936, 1946, 1956, 1966, 1975, 1984, 1994, 2004 and 2014. First results (20%) were published on September 12, 2014, the final results were published between January and December 2015.

Map of Tunisia in Africa

Tunisian flag

Coat of arms of Tunisia

Demographic and historical evolution of the Tunisian population since the first official census carried out in 1921
N.	Year	Population Tunisia	Population and Housing Census
20th century
1st	1921	2,093,939	1921 Tunisian census
2nd	1926	▲2,159,708	1926 Tunisian census
3rd	1931	▲2,410,692	1931 Tunisian census
4th	1936	▲2,608,313	1936 Tunisian census
5th	1946	▲3,230,952	1946 Tunisian census
6th	1956	▲3,783,169	1956 Tunisian census
7th	1966	▲4,533,351	1966 Tunisian census
8th	1975	▲5,588,209	1975 Tunisian census
9th	1984	▲6,966,173	1984 Tunisian census
10th	1994	▲8,785,364	1994 Tunisian census
21st century
11th	2004	▲9,906,563	2004 Tunisian census
12th	2014	▲10,982,754	2014 Tunisian census
13th	2024	▲11,972,169	2024 Tunisian census

=== Uganda ===
The first censuses in Uganda were taken in 1911, 1921 and 1931. It was done in a rather primitive way. The enumeration unit was 'huts' and not individuals. More scientific censuses were taken 1948 and 1959 where the enumeration unit was persons. The census was however divided into two separate enumerations, one for Africans, and one for the non-African population.

The censuses during independence 1969, 1980, 1991 were taken jointly for all races. The censuses 1980 and 1991 included housing information and in addition a larger questionnaire for a sample of the population. However, the questionnaires for the 1980 were lost and only provisional figures are available from this census.

The census in 2002 involved some 50,000 enumerators and supervisors. It covered several topics including: population and housing; agriculture; and Micro- and small Enterprises administered at individual/household level. The Preliminary Results were published two weeks after the enumeration. The Final Results were released in March 2005, while the analytical findings and the district level results were scheduled to be released in the second quarter of 2006.

The next census was conducted in August 2014 under the theme of ‘Counting for Planning and Improved Service Delivery’. Provisional results were released in November 2014 and the main report was released in March 2016. In August 2024, the latest census was conducted under the theme of 'It matters to be counted'. The final report was released in December 2024.

Map of Uganda in Africa

Ugandan flag

Coat of arms of Uganda

Demographic and historical evolution of the Ugandan population since the first official census carried out in 1911.
N.	Year	Population Uganda	Population and Housing Census
20th century
Steady	1911	2,466,325	1911 Colonial census
Steady	1921	▲2,854,608	1921 Colonial census
Steady	1931	▲3,542,281	1931 Colonial census
Steady	1948	▲4,958,520	1948 Colonial census
Steady	1959	▲6,536,616	1959 Colonial census
1st	1969	▲9,535,051	1969 Ugandan census
2nd	1980	▲12,636,179	1980 Ugandan census
3rd	1991	▲16,671,705	1991 Ugandan census
21st century
4th	2002	▲24,227,297	2002 Ugandan census
5th	2014	▲34,634,650	2014 Ugandan census
6th	2024	▲45,905,417	2024 Ugandan census

== Americas ==
=== Antigua and Barbuda ===
Population & Housing Censuses was carried out in 1991, 2001, and 2011. The 2011 census was released in May 2014.

=== Argentina ===
Map of Argentina in the Americas

National population censuses are carried out in Argentina roughly every ten years, the last ones having been carried out in 2001, October 27, 2010 and May 18, 2022.

Argentinian flag

Coat of arms

Demographic and historical evolution of the Argentinian population since the first official census carried out in 1869.
N.	Year	Population Argentina	Population and Housing Census
19th century
1st	1869	1,877,490	1869 Argentinian census
2nd	1895	▲4,044,911	1895 Argentinian census
20th century
3rd	1914	▲7,903,662	1914 Argentinian census
4th	1947	▲15,893,811	1947 Argentinian census
5th	1960	▲20,013,793	1960 Argentinian census
6th	1970	▲23,364,431	1970 Argentinian census
7th	1980	▲27,949,480	1980 Argentinian census
8th	1991	▲32,615,528	1991 Argentinian census
21st century
9th	2001	▲36,260,140	2001 Argentinian census
10th	2010	▲40,117,096	2010 Argentinian census
11th	2022	▲45,892,285	2022 Argentinian census

=== Barbados ===
Censuses on population sizes in Barbados are conducted by the Barbados Statistical Service (BSS). The last major census was conducted in 2021.

=== Bolivia ===
Map of Bolivia in the Americas

Bolivia became independent from Spain on August 6, 1825, and since that time the country has managed to carry out around 11 population and housing censuses throughout its history as an independent country.

The first population census of Bolivia was carried out in 1831 and four years later the second census was carried out in 1835, the third in 1845, the fourth in 1854 and finally the fifth census was in 1882, this being the last 19th century census.

During the 20th century, Bolivia only carried out four censuses; the first at the beginning of the century in 1900 and the second census was in 1950 (after 50 years) already in the middle of the 20th century. The next census was carried out 26 years later in 1976 and the next census was carried out after 16 years in 1992, this being also the last of the century.

At the beginning of the 21st century, Bolivia carried out a new population census in 2001 and after 11 years the next census was carried out again in 2012. Currently and after 12 years, Bolivia will carry out its third census on March 23, 2024, this being the third population and housing census of the century

Bolivian flag

Coat of arms of Bolivia

Demographic and historical evolution of the Bolivian population since the first official census carried out in 1831.
N.	Year	Population Bolivia	Population and Housing Census
19th century
1st	1831	1,088,768	1831 Bolivian census
2nd	1835	▼1,060,777	1835 Bolivian census
3rd	1845	▲1,378,896	1845 Bolivian census
4th	1854	▲2,326,126	1854 Bolivian census
5th	1882	▼1,172,156	1882 Bolivian census
20th century
6th	1900	▲1,766,451	1900 Bolivian census
7th	1950	▲2,704,165	1950 Bolivian census
8th	1976	▲4,613,419	1976 Bolivian census
9th	1992	▲6,420,792	1992 Bolivian census
21st century
10th	2001	▲8,274,325	2001 Bolivian census
11th	2012	▲10,059,856	2012 Bolivian census
12th	2024	▲11,365,333	2024 Bolivian census
National Institute of Statistics of Bolivia (INE)

=== Brazil ===
The Brazilian census is carried out by the Brazilian Institute of Geography and Statistics every 10 years. The last one was in 2010. Earlier censuses were taken in 1872 (the first), 1900, 1920, 1941, 1950, 1960, 1970, 1980, 1991, 2000 and 2010.

Brazil's Demographic Census is one of the most hierarchical collection of census data in the world. Its hierarchies include: Brazil (Country), Major Regions, States, Macro-regions, micro-regions, municipalities, districts, sub-districts, Neighborhoods and census tracts.

Depending on the administrative hierarchy, some types of data are not published to respect confidentiality.

For example:

1. The lower area of data collection is the census tract, with approximately 300 households, and information is collected on age, condition of the home, gender, income, among others.
2. Districts: information on race, color, religion, disability, etc.
3. Municipalities (cities): in addition to the information already described, there is information of GDP, industrial production, agricultural production, migration between cities to study or work, to live migration, inflation, employment rates, number of industries, the quantity of trade, etc.

Information is collected with handheld computers equipped with GPS receivers and digitized maps.

Next census was scheduled to begin August 1, 2020 but was delayed two times due to the ongoing COVID-19 pandemic. The Census is scheduled to begin on August 1, 2022. More than one million people applied for 206.891 positions.

Map of Brazil in the Americas

Brazilian flag

Coat of arms of Brazil

Demographic and historical evolution of the Brazilian population since the first official census carried out in 1872.
N.	Year	Population Brazil	Population and Housing Census
19th century
1st	1872	9,930,478	1872 Brazilian census
2nd	1890	▲14,333,915	1890 Brazilian census
20th century
3rd	1900	▲17,438,434	1900 Brazilian census
4th	1920	▲30,635,605	1920 Brazilian census
5th	1940	▲41,236,315	1940 Brazilian census
6th	1950	▲51,944,397	1950 Brazilian census
7th	1960	▲70,992,343	1960 Brazilian census
8th	1970	▲94,508,583	1970 Brazilian census
9th	1980	▲121,150,573	1980 Brazilian census
10th	1991	▲146,917,459	1991 Brazilian census
21st century
11th	2000	▲169,590,693	2000 Brazilian census
12th	2010	▲190,755,799	2010 Brazilian census
13th	2022	▲203,062,512	2022 Brazilian census

=== Canada ===
The Canadian census is run by Statistics Canada. The 1666 census of New France was conducted by French intendant Jean Talon, when he took a census to ascertain the number of people living in New France. The method and data was later used when Canada was founded 201 years later. The individual provinces (sometimes in conjunction with each other) conducted censuses in the 19th century and before. In 1871, Canada's first formal census was conducted, which counted the population of Nova Scotia, Ontario, New Brunswick, and Quebec.

Censuses in Canada are conducted in five-year intervals. The last census was conducted in 2026. Censuses taken in mid-decade (1976, 1986, 1996, etc.) are referred to as quinquennial censuses. Others are referred to as decennial censuses. The first quinquennial census was conducted in 1956.

For the 2006 Census of Canada, respondents were able to complete their census questionnaire online for the first time. Other options for answering the questionnaire included postal mail (using a pre-paid envelope) and telephone (using an 800 number).

At a sub-national level, two provinces (Alberta and Saskatchewan) and two territories (Nunavut and Yukon) have legislation that allows local governments to conduct their own municipal censuses.

Map of Canada in the Americas

Canadian flag

Demographic and historical evolution of the Canadian population since the first official census carried out in 1871.
N.	Year	Population Canada	Population and Housing Census
19th century
1st	1871	3,485,761	1871 Canadian census
2nd	1881	4,278,327	1881 Canadian census
3rd	1891	▲4,833,239	1891 Canadian census
20th century
4th	1901	▲5,371,315	1901 Canadian census
5th	1911	▲7,204,838	1911 Canadian census
6th	1921	▲8,788,483	1921 Canadian census
7th	1931	▲10,376,379	1931 Canadian census
8th	1941	▲11,506,655	1941 Canadian census
9th	1951	▲14,009,429	1951 Canadian census
10th	1956	▲16,080,791	1956 Canadian census
11th	1961	▲18,238,247	1961 Canadian census
12th	1966	▲20,014,880	1966 Canadian census
13th	1971	▲21,568,311	1971 Canadian census
14th	1976	▲22,992,604	1976 Canadian census
15th	1981	▲24,343,181	1981 Canadian census
16th	1986	▲25,309,331	1986 Canadian census
17th	1991	▲27,296,859	1991 Canadian census
18th	1996	▲28,846,761	1996 Canadian census
21st century
19th	2001	▲30,007,094	2001 Canadian census
20th	2006	▲31,612,897	2006 Canadian census
21st	2011	▲33,476,688	2011 Canadian census
22nd	2016	▲35,151,728	2016 Canadian census
23rd	2021	▲36,991,981	2021 Canadian census
24th	2026	Projection	2026 Canadian census

=== Chile ===
National population censuses are carried out in Chile every ten years by the National Statistics Institute (INE). The last one took place in 2012, but its results were dismissed by the INE due to a high omission rate and other problems. A new abbreviated census took place in April 2017, with a full census to be carried out in 2022. The last official census results are from 2002.

Map of Chile in the Americas

Chilean flag

Coat of arms of Chile

Demographic and historical evolution of the Chilean population since the first official census carried out in 1835.
N.	Year	Population Chile	Population and Housing Census
19th century
1st	1835	1,010,336	1835 Chilean census
2nd	1843	1,083,701	1843 Chilean census
3rd	1854	▲1,439,120	1854 Chilean census
4th	1865	▲1,819,223	1865 Chilean census
5th	1875	▲2,075,971	1875 Chilean census
6th	1885	▲2,507,005	1885 Chilean census
7th	1895	▲2,695,625	1895 Chilean census
20th century
8th	1907	▲3,231,022	1907 Chilean census
9th	1920	▲3,720,235	1920 Chilean census
10th	1930	▲4,287,445	1930 Chilean census
11th	1940	▲5,023,539	1940 Chilean census
12th	1952	▲5,932,995	1952 Chilean census
13th	1960	▲7,374,115	1960 Chilean census
14th	1970	▲8,884,768	1970 Chilean census
15th	1982	▲11,329,736	1982 Chilean census
16th	1992	▲13,348,401	1992 Chilean census
21st century
17th	2002	▲15,116,435	2002 Chilean census
18th	2012	▲16 634 603	2012 Chilean census
19th	2017	▲17,574,003	2017 Chilean census
20th	2024	▲18,480,432	2024 Chilean census

=== Colombia ===
Population and Housing Censuses in Colombia were conducted by the National Administrative Department of Statistics in 1825, 1835, 1843, 1851, 1864, 1870, 1905, 1912, 1918, 1928, 1938, 1951, 1964, 1973, 1985, 1993, 2005 and 2018.

Map of Colombia in the Americas

Colombian flag

Coat of arms of Colombia

Demographic and historical evolution of the Colombian population since the first official census carried out in 1825.
N.	Year	Population Colombia	Population and Housing Census
19th century
1st	1825	2,583,799	1825 Colombian census
2nd	1835	▼1,687,109	1835 Colombian census
3rd	1843	▲1,932,279	1843 Colombian census
4th	1851	▲2,243,730	1851 Colombian census
5th	1864	▲2,441,300	1864 Colombian census
6th	1870	▲2,681,637	1870 Colombian census
20th century
7th	1905	▲4,533,777	1905 Colombian census
8th	1912	▲5,472,604	1912 Colombian census
9th	1918	▲5,855,077	1918 Colombian census
10th	1928	▲7,851,110	1928 Colombian census
11th	1938	▲8,697,041	1938 Colombian census
12th	1951	▲11,548,172	1951 Colombian census
13th	1964	▲17,484,510	1964 Colombian census
14th	1973	▲20,666,920	1973 Colombian census
15th	1985	▲27,853,432	1985 Colombian census
16th	1993	▲33,109,839	1993 Colombian census
21st century
17th	2005	▲41,468,384	2005 Colombian census
18th	2018	▲48,258,494	2018 Colombian census

=== Costa Rica ===
Costa Rica carried out its tenth population census in 2011. INEC, National Institute of Statistics and Census is in charge of conduct these censuses. Past Costa Rican censuses were conducted in 1864, 1883, 1892, 1927, 1950, 1963, 1973, 1984, and 2000. The next census is scheduled for 2022.

Map of Costa Rica in the Americas

Costa Rican flag

Coat of arms of Costa Rica

Demographic and historical evolution of the Costa Rican population since the first official census carried out in 1864.
N.	Year	Population Costa Rica	Population and Housing Census
19th century
1st	1864	120,499	1864 Costa Rican census
2nd	1883	▲182,073	1883 Costa Rican census
3rd	1892	▲243,205	1892 Costa Rican census
20th century
4th	1927	▲471,524	1927 Costa Rican census
5th	1950	▲800,875	1950 Costa Rican census
6th	1963	▲1,336,274	1963 Costa Rican census
7th	1973	▲1,871,780	1973 Costa Rican census
8th	1984	▲2,416,809	1984 Costa Rican census
21st century
9th	2000	▲3,810,179	2000 Costa Rican census
10th	2011	▲4,301,712	2011 Costa Rican census
11th	2022	▲5,044,197	2022 Costa Rican census

=== Cuba ===
Cuba carried out its eighteenth population census in 2012. The next census is scheduled for 2025.

=== Curaçao ===
General censuses of population and housing have been carried out in 1960, 1971, 1981, 1992, 2001, and 2011. In 2021 a new census will be conducted by the Central Bureau of Statistics of Curaçao. For more information and the results of the older censuses visit the DIgitallibrary of CBS

=== Ecuador ===
The most recent censuses in Ecuador were in 2001, 2010 and 2022.

Map of Ecuador in the Americas

Ecuadorian flag

Coat of arms of Ecuador

Demographic and historical evolution of the Ecuadorian population since the first official census carried out in 1825.
N.	Year	Population Ecuador	Population and Housing Census
19th century
1st	1825	496,846	1825 Ecuadorian Census
2nd	1840	▲616,209	1840 Ecuadorian Census
3rd	1858	▲748,297	1858 Ecuadorian Census
4th	1889	▲1,271,761	1889 Ecuadorian Census
20th century
5th	1909	▲1,642,856	1909 Ecuadorian Census
6th	1926	▲2,929,314	1926 Ecuadorian Census
7th	1933	▼2,600,116	1933 Ecuadorian Census
8th	1942	▲3,084,963	1942 Ecuadorian Census
9th	1950	▲3,202,757	1950 Ecuadorian Census
10th	1962	▲4,476,007	1962 Ecuadorian Census
11th	1974	▲6,500,845	1974 Ecuadorian Census
12th	1982	▲8,138,974	1982 Ecuadorian Census
13th	1990	▲9,697,979	1990 Ecuadorian Census
21st century
14th	2000	▲12,156,608	2000 Ecuadorian Census
15th	2010	▲14,483,499	2010 Ecuadorian Census
16th	2022	▲16,938,986	2022 Ecuadorian Census

=== Guatemala ===
Modern population censuses have been taken in Guatemala in 1930, 1950, 1964, 1973, 1981, 1994, 2002 and 2018. Controversial censuses include those in 1950 and 1964 (misclassification of the Maya population) and 1994 (generally questioned). About 14,000,000 people live in Guatemala as of July 2009.

Map of Guatemala in the Americas

Guatemalan flag

Coat of arms of Guatemala

Demographic and historical evolution of the Guatemalan population since the first official census carried out in 1880.
N.	Year	Population Guatemala	Population and Housing Census
19th century
1st	1880	1,224,602	1880 Guatemalan Census
2nd	1893	▲1,364,678	1893 Guatemalan Census
20th century
3rd	1921	▲2,004,900	1921 Guatemalan Census
4th	1940	▲2,400,000	1940 Guatemalan Census
5th	1950	▲2,790,868	1950 Guatemalan Census
6th	1964	▲4,287,997	1964 Guatemalan Census
7th	1973	▲5,160,221	1973 Guatemalan Census
8th	1981	▲6,054,227	1981 Guatemalan Census
9th	1994	▲8,331,874	1994 Guatemalan Census
21st century
10th	2002	▲11,237,196	2002 Guatemalan Census
11th	2018	▲14,901,286	2018 Guatemalan Census

=== Haiti ===
General censuses of population and housing (French: Recensement Général de la Population et de l'Habitat (RGPH)) have been carried out in 1950, 1971, 1982, 2003 and 2014. First results of the 2014 census will be published between November and December 2014; final results will be published in November 2015.

=== Honduras ===
Honduras has held a national census every 11–14 years since 1950. Its first census as an independent country took place in 1881. The next census is scheduled to be held in 2026.

Honduras in Central America

Flag of Honduras

Coat of arms

Demographics and historical evolution of the Honduran population since the first official census in 1881.
N.	Year	Population	Population and Housing Census
19th century
1st	1881	307,289	1883 Honduran census
2nd	1887	▲331,917	1887 Honduran census
3rd	1895	▲398,877	1895 Honduran census
20th century
4th	1901	▲543,741	1901 Honduran census
5th	1905	▲500,136	1905 Honduran census
6th	1910	▲553,446	1910 Honduran census
7th	1916	▲605,997	1916 Honduran census
8th	1930	▲854,184	1930 Honduran census
9th	1935	▲962,000	1935 Honduran census
10th	1940	▲1,107,859	1940 Honduran census
11th	1945	▲1,200,542	1945 Honduran census
12th	1950	▲1,399,588	1950 Honduran census
13th	1961	▲1,996,185	1961 Honduran census
14th	1974	▲2,966,244	1974 Honduran census
15th	1988	▲4,614,377	1988 Honduran census
21st century
16th	2001	▲6,535,344	2001 Honduran census
17th	2013	▲8,303,771	2013 Honduran census
18th	2026		2026 Honduran census

=== Mexico ===
- National population censuses have been carried out in 1910, 1921, 1930, 1940, 1950, 1960, 1970, 1980, 1990, 1995, 2000, 2005 and 2010.
- National economic censuses have been carried out in 1989, 1994, 1999, 2004, 2009 and 2014.

Map of Mexico in the Americas

Mexican flag

Coat of arms of Mexico

Demographic and historical evolution of the Mexican population since the first official census carried out in 1880.
N.	Year	Population Mexico	Population and Housing Census
19th century
1st	1895	12,491,573	1895 Mexican Census
20th century
2nd	1900	▲13,545,462	1900 Mexican Census
3rd	1910	▲15,160,369	1910 Mexican Census
4th	1921	▼14,334,096	1921 Mexican Census
5th	1930	▲16,552,722	1930 Mexican Census
6th	1940	▲19,653,552	1940 Mexican Census
7th	1950	▲25,791,017	1950 Mexican Census
8th	1960	▲34,923,129	1960 Mexican Census
9th	1970	▲48,225,238	1970 Mexican Census
10th	1980	▲66,846,833	1980 Mexican Census
11th	1990	▲81,249,645	1990 Mexican Census
21st century
12th	2000	▲97,483,412	2000 Mexican Census
13th	2010	▲112,336,538	2010 Mexican Census
14th	2020	▲126,014,024	2020 Mexican Census

=== Nicaragua ===
Map of Nicaragua in the Americas

Nicaraguan flag

Coat of arms of Nicaragua

Demographic and historical evolution of the Nicaraguan population since the first official census carried out in 1906.
N.	Year	Population Nicaragua	Population and Housing Census
20th century
1st	1906	501,849	1906 Nicaraguan Census
2nd	1920	▲633,622	1920 Nicaraguan Census
3rd	1940	▲829,831	1940 Nicaraguan Census
4th	1950	▲1,049,611	1950 Nicaraguan Census
5th	1963	▲1,535,588	1963 Nicaraguan Census
6th	1971	▲1,877,952	1971 Nicaraguan Census
7th	1995	▲4,357,099	1995 Nicaraguan Census
21st century
8th	2005	▲5,142,098	2005 Nicaraguan Census

=== Panama ===
Map of Panama in the Americas

Panamanian flag

Coat of arms of Panama

Demographic and historical evolution of the Panamanian population since the first official census carried out in 1911.
N.	Year	Population Panama	Population and Housing Census
20th century
1st	1911	336,742	1911 Panamanian Census
2nd	1920	▲446,098	1920 Panamanian Census
3rd	1930	▲467,459	1930 Panamanian Census
4th	1940	▲622,576	1940 Panamanian Census
5th	1950	▲805,285	1950 Panamanian Census
6th	1960	▲1,075,541	1960 Panamanian Census
7th	1970	▲1,428,082	1970 Panamanian Census
8th	1980	▲1,805,287	1980 Panamanian Census
9th	1990	▲2,329,329	1990 Panamanian Census
21st century
10th	2000	▲2,839,177	2000 Panamanian Census
11th	2010	▲3,405,813	2010 Panamanian Census
12th	2023	▲4,064,780	2023 Panamanian Census

=== Paraguay ===
Map of Paraguay in the Americas

Paraguayan flag

Coat of arms of Paraguay

Demographic and historical evolution of the Paraguayan population since the first official census carried out in 1846.
N.	Year	Population Paraguay	Population and Housing Census
19th century
1st	1846	233,394	1846 Paraguayan Census
2nd	1870	▼116,351	1870 Paraguayan Census
20th century
3rd	1950	▲1,328,452	1950 Paraguayan Census
4th	1962	▲1,819,103	1962 Paraguayan Census
5th	1972	▲2,357,955	1972 Paraguayan Census
6th	1982	▲3,029,830	1982 Paraguayan Census
7th	1992	▲4,152,588	1992 Paraguayan Census
21st century
8th	2002	▲5,163,198	2002 Paraguayan Census
9th	2012	▲6,461,041	2012 Paraguayan Census
10th	2022	▼6,109,644	2022 Paraguayan Census

=== Peru ===
The first census in Peru was carried out in 1836. The 13th and latest one was the 2025 Census and was carried out by Instituto Nacional de Estadística e Informática in 2025.

Map of Peru in the Americas

Peruvian flag

Coat of arms of Perú

Demographic and historical evolution of the Peruvian population since the first official census carried out in 1836.
N.	Year	Population Peru	Population and Housing Census
19th century
1st	1836	1,873,736	1836 Peruvian census
2nd	1850	▲2,001,203	1850 Peruvian census
3rd	1862	▲2,487,916	1862 Peruvian census
4th	1876	▲2,699,105	1876 Peruvian census
20th century
5th	1940	▲7,023,111	1940 Peruvian census
6th	1961	▲10,420,357	1961 Peruvian census
7th	1972	▲14,121,564	1972 Peruvian census
8th	1981	▲17,762,231	1981 Peruvian census
9th	1993	▲22,639,443	1993 Peruvian census
21st century
10th	2005	▲27,219,264	2005 Peruvian census
11th	2007	▲28,220,764	2007 Peruvian census
12th	2017	▲31,237,385	2017 Peruvian census
13th	2025	▲34,157,732	2025 Peruvian census

=== United States ===
The United States Constitution and federal law mandate that a census be taken every ten years to apportion the number of members of the United States House of Representatives among the several states. Census statistics are also used to apportion federal funding for many social and economic programs.

The first U.S. Census was conducted in 1790 by Federal Marshals. During the 19th century and through the 1940 census, enumeration was accomplished through political districts. Each ward was responsible for producing a census.

From 1950 onward, census forms were mailed to every address on record with the United States Post Office, including the Armed Services Postal System, in an effort to enhance completeness of the data collected. Beginning in 1970, it was made illegal to fail to return a completed census form. Computer technology was also introduced.

The 2010 census counted over 308 million people.

By law (92 Stat. 915, Public Law 95-416, enacted on October 5, 1978), individual census records are sealed for 72 years. The individual census data most recently released to the public was the 1940 census, released on April 2, 2012. Aggregate census data are released when available.

In addition to the decennial federal census, local censuses have also been conducted, for example, in Massachusetts, which conducted a statewide census every five years until 1985. Some states conducted limited censuses for various purposes, and these are typically located in state archives.

Next census was scheduled to begin 1 April 2020 but delays due to the ongoing COVID-19 pandemic meant most areas did not assign enumerators and begin counting until after August 1, 2020, even while their questions are still written to tabulate information about a housing unit's status on the prior date.

The 2020 census counted for over 331 million people.

Map of the United States in the Americas

United States flag

Coat of arms of the United States

Demographic and historical evolution of the United States population since the first official census carried out in 1790.
N.	Year	Population United States	Population and Housing Census
18th century
1st	1790	3,929,214	1790 United States census
19th century
2nd	1800	▲5,308,483	1800 United States census
3rd	1810	▲7,239,881	1810 United States census
4th	1820	▲9,638,454	1820 United States census
5th	1830	▲12,866,020	1830 United States census
6th	1840	▲17,069,453	1840 United States census
7th	1850	▲23,191,876	1850 United States census
8th	1860	▲31,443,321	1860 United States census
9th	1870	▲38,925,598	1870 United States census
10th	1880	▲50,189,209	1880 United States census
11th	1890	▲62,979,766	1890 United States census
20th century
12th	1900	▲76,212,168	1900 United States census
13th	1910	▲92,228,496	1910 United States census
14th	1920	▲106,021,537	1920 United States census
15th	1930	▲122,775,046	1930 United States census
16th	1940	▲132,164,569	1940 United States census
17th	1950	▲151,325,798	1950 United States census
18th	1960	▲179,323,175	1960 United States census
19th	1970	▲203,392,031	1970 United States census
20th	1980	▲226,545,805	1980 United States census
21st	1990	▲248,709,873	1990 United States census
21st century
22nd	2000	▲281,421,906	2000 United States census
23rd	2010	▲308,745,538	2010 United States census
24th	2020	▲331,449,281	2020 United States census
25th	2030	Projection	2030 United States Census

=== Uruguay ===
Map of Uruguay in the Americas

Uruguayan flag

Coat of arms of Uruguay

Demographic and historical evolution of the Uruguayan population since the first official census carried out in 1852.
N.	Year	Population Uruguay	Population and Housing Census
19th century
1st	1852	131,969	1852 Uruguayan census
2nd	1860	▲223,238	1860 Uruguayan census
20th century
3rd	1908	▲1,042,686	1908 Uruguayan census
4th	1963	▲2,595,510	1963 Uruguayan census
5th	1975	▲2,788,429	1975 Uruguayan census
6th	1985	▲2,955,241	1985 Uruguayan census
7th	1996	▲3,137,188	1996 Uruguayan census
21st century
8th	2004	▲3,241,003	2004 Uruguayan census
9th	2011	▲3,286,314	2011 Uruguayan census
10th	2023	▲3,499,451	2023 Uruguayan census

=== Venezuela ===
The study of the population in Venezuela is in charge of the National Institute of Statistics, which is in charge of collecting, analyzing and publishing data. Its best known publication is the Population Census, which is carried out in a period of no more than 15 years.

The last study of this type was carried out in 2011 between September and November.

Map of Venezuela in the Americas

Venezuelan flag

Coat of arms of Venezuela

Demographic and historical evolution of the Venezuelan population since the first official census carried out in 1873.
N.	Year	Population Venezuela	Population and Housing Census
19th century
1st	1873	1,732,411	1873 Venezuelan Census
2nd	1881	▲2,005,139	1881 Venezuelan Census
3rd	1891	▲2,221,572	1891 Venezuelan Census
20th century
4th	1920	▲2,479,525	1920 Venezuelan Census
5th	1926	▲2,814,131	1926 Venezuelan Census
6th	1936	▲3,364,347	1936 Venezuelan Census
7th	1941	▲3,850,771	1941 Venezuelan Census
8th	1950	▲5,034,838	1950 Venezuelan Census
9th	1961	▲7,523,999	1961 Venezuelan Census
10th	1971	▲10,721,522	1971 Venezuelan Census
11th	1981	▲14,516,735	1981 Venezuelan Census
12th	1990	▲18,105,265	1990 Venezuelan Census
21st century
13th	2001	▲23,054,210	2001 Venezuelan Census
14th	2011	▲27,227,930	2011 Venezuelan Census
-	2021	▲28,199,867	World Bank estimates

== Asia ==
=== Afghanistan ===
A partial and incomplete population census was taken in Afghanistan in June 1979. Wars since then have caused significant population displacement and there has not been an updated count nor does the nation seem to have the technical ability nor will to tackle a modern census.

=== Armenia ===
Population censuses have been taken in Armenia under Russian/Soviet rule in 1831, 1873, 1886, 1897, 1922, 1926, 1939, 1959, 1970, 1979, and 1989. Beginning in 1991, three more censuses' have been carried out in Armenia: one in 2001, one in 2011 and one in 2022.

=== Azerbaijan ===
Population censuses have been taken in Azerbaijan under Russian/Soviet rule in 1897, 1926, 1937, 1939, 1959, 1970, 1979, and 1989. Beginning in 1991, two more censuses have been carried out in Azerbaijan: one in 1999 and one in 2009.

=== Bangladesh ===
Population censuses were conducted by the Bangladesh Bureau of Statistics (BBS) in 1974, 1981, 1991, 2001, 2011 and 2022. The 2022 Census was the nation's first digital census.

Map of Bangladesh in Asia

Bangladeshi flag

Coat of arms of Bangladesh

Demographic and historical evolution of the Bangladeshi population since the first official census carried out in 1974.
N.	Year	Population Bangladesh	Population and Housing Census
20th century
1st	1974	71,479,071	1974 Bangladeshi census
2nd	1981	▲87,119,965	1981 Bangladeshi census
3rd	1991	▲106,314,992	1991 Bangladeshi census
21st century
4th	2001	▲124,355,263	2001 Bangladeshi census
5th	2011	▲144,043,697	2011 Bangladeshi census
6th	2022	▲165,158,616	2022 Bangladeshi census

=== China ===
From the end of the imperial period in 1911, China's first censuses were irregular: the Republic of China held censuses in 1913 and 1944. Under Mao Zedong, the People's Republic of China held its first in 1952, but the second in 1963 was secret and unacknowledged until the early 1980s.

The 1982 Chinese census was much more thorough and well-conducted than the first two, and similar censuses have been conducted decennially in 1990, 2000, 2010, and 2020. These are the world's biggest censuses and over 6 million enumerators were engaged in the 2000 and 2010 censuses.

Between the national censuses, 1% National Population Sample Surveys were taken in 1987, 1995, and 2005; 0.1% National Population Sample Surveys have been taken annually since 2000. National agricultural, economic, and industrial censuses are also taken on a regular basis. The first economic census was taken in 2004 and the second 2008.

Map of China in Asia

Chinese flag

Coat of arms of China

Demographic and historical evolution of the mainland Chinese population since the first official census carried out in 1953.
N.	Year	Population Mainland China	National Population Census
20th century
1st	1953	582,603,417	1953 Chinese census
2nd	1964	▲694,581,759	1964 Chinese census
3rd	1982	▲1,008,180,738	1982 Chinese census
4th	1990	▲1,133,683,417	1990 Chinese census
21st century
5th	2000	▲1,245,110,826	2000 Chinese census
6th	2010	▲1,339,724,852	2010 Chinese census
7th	2020	▲1,411,778,724	2020 Chinese census

=== Cyprus ===
The British carried out seven censuses in Cyprus in total: six at ten-year intervals between 1881 and 1931, and the last in 1946. Following the establishment of the modern state, there have been seven more censuses: in 1960 (the year of establishment), 1973, 1976, 1982, 1992, 2001 and 2011. The Statistical Service of the Cypriot government counts from the first British census, i.e. the latest census, in 2011, is referred to as the 14th census. In Northern Cyprus there have been three censuses: in 1996, 2006 and 2011. All three have been a matter of controversy, both in the north and the south, and abroad.

=== Hong Kong ===
Census takes place every 10 years and by-census between two censuses by the Census and Statistics Department of Hong Kong. The last census was the 2021 Population Census in Hong Kong.

=== India ===
The decennial census of India is the primary source of information about the demographic characteristics of the population of India. The 2011 census is one of the largest censuses in the history of mankind.

The first census in India in modern times was conducted in 1873. First regular census was started in 1881 by Lord Ripon. Since then, a population census has been carried out every 10 years. The latest census commenced on May 1, 2010. It will create a National Population Register with photographs and fingerprints of every resident. All usual residents of India will also be provided with their Unique ID numbers and National Identity Cards. The census is carried out by the office of the Registrar General and Census Commissioner of India, Delhi, an office in the Ministry of Home Affairs, Government of India, under the 1948 Census of India Act. The act gives Central Government many powers like to notify a date for Census, power to ask for the services of any citizen for census work. The law makes it compulsory for every citizen to answer the census questions truthfully. The Act provides penalties for giving false answers or not giving answers at all to the census questionnaire. One of the most important provisions of law is the guarantee for the maintenance of secrecy of the information collected at the census of each individual. The census records are not open to inspection and also not admissible in evidence.

The census is conducted in two phases: first, house listing and house numbering phase and second, the actual population enumeration phase. The census is carried out by the canvassing method. In this method, each household is visited and the information is collected by specially trained enumerator. They collect data related to households e.g. number of members, water & electricity supply, ownership of land, vehicles, computers and other assets and services. In the second phase, total population is counted and statistics related to individuals are collected and saved into the governments hand.

Map of India in Asia

Indian flag

Coat of arms of India

Demographic and historical evolution of the Indian population since the first official census carried out in 1872.
N.	Year	Population India	Population and Housing Census
19th century
1st	1872	190,563,048	1872 Indian census
2nd	1881	▲253,891,821	1881 Indian census
3rd	1891	▲287,223,431	1891 Indian census
20th century
4th	1901	▲294,361,056	1901 Indian census
5th	1911	▲313,547,840	1911 Indian census
6th	1921	▲316,128,721	1921 Indian census
7th	1931	▲350,529,557	1931 Indian census
8th	1946	▲386,666,623	1946 Indian census
9th	1951	▼361,088,090	1951 Indian census
10th	1961	▲438,936,918	1961 Indian census
11th	1971	▲547,949,809	1971 Indian census
12th	1981	▲685,184,692	1981 Indian census
13th	1991	▲838,583,988	1991 Indian census
21st century
14th	2001	▲1,028,737,436	2001 Indian census
15th	2011	▲1,210,854,977	2011 Indian census
16th	2027	▲1,400,000,000	2027 Indian census

=== Indonesia ===
The first population census was done during the colonial era, 1930. Before that, a non-overall census was already conducted in 1920. After that census was done irregularly. The first census after independence was 1961, followed by 1971. Since 1980 it is conducted regularly every 10 years. In between, there is also economical census (every 10 years, five years after population census) and agricultural census (three years after population census). The last census was held in September 2020 (2020 Indonesian census).

=== Iran ===
The Statistical Center of Iran carries out nationwide population and housing censuses every ten years, the first of which conducted in 1956 (1335 AP) reporting a total population of 19 million people. Since then, seven other censuses were conducted in 1966, 1976, 1986, 1996, 2006, 2011, 2016. As seen, the two censuses in 2006 and 2011 were conducted on a five-year basis, following a 2008 law. The law was rescinded in 2020, with the president announcing that the next census would be conducted in 2026, due to modernizing method to Register-based Census.

Map of Iran in Asia

Iranian flag

Coat of arms of Iran

Demographic and historical evolution of the iranian population since the first official census carried out in 1956.
N.	Year	Population Iran	Population and Housing Census
20th century
1st	1956	18,954,704	1956 Iranian census
2nd	1966	▲25,785,210	1966 Iranian census
3rd	1976	▲33,708,744	1976 Iranian census
4th	1986	▲49,445,010	1986 Iranian census
5th	1996	▲60,055,488	1996 Iranian census
21st century
6th	2006	▲70,495,782	2006 Iranian census
7th	2011	▲75,149,669	2011 Iranian census
8th	2016	▲79,926,270	2016 Iranian census
9th	2023	▲86,736,000	Estimates

=== Iraq ===
The Central Statistical Organization – Ministry of Planning of Iraq is responsible for population and housing censuses.

According to the British government in Iraq, the population estimate in 1920 was 3 million. In 1927, the General Directorate of Population carried out the census, the population estimate was 2,968,054. Later, there were another 8 censuses in the years 1934, 1947, 1957, 1965, 1977, 1987, 1997 and the last one that was carried out in 2024.

The 1997 census was considered to be incomplete as the Kurdistan region was not counted at the census.

After the War of Iraq, there was a plan for a new population and housing census, and in November 2024 the first nationwide census in nearly 40 years, however the ethnicity question was omitted due to conflicts. The 2024 census counted that 45.4 million people lived in Iraq

Map of Iraq in Asia

Iraqi flag

Coat of arms of Iraq

Demographic and historical evolution of the iraqi population since the first official census carried out in 1927.
N.	Year	Population Iraq	Population and Housing Census
20th century
1st	1927	2,968,054	1927 Iraqi census
2nd	1934	▲3,380,553	1934 Iraqi census
3rd	1947	▲4,816,185	1947 Iraqi census
4th	1957	▲6,339,960	1957 Iraqi census
5th	1965	▲8,097,230	1965 Iraqi census
6th	1977	▲12,000,497	1977 Iraqi census
7th	1987	▲16,335,199	1987 Iraqi census
8th	1997	▲22,046,244	1997 Iraqi census
21st century
9th	2024	▲46,118,793	2024 Iraqi census

=== Israel ===
The first census in the state of Israel was held in November 1948, six months after its creation, to establish the population registry. Subsequent censuses were conducted by the Israel Central Bureau of Statistics (ICBS) in 1961, 1972, 1983, 1995 and 2008. In these, 20% of households completed a detailed survey and the remainder a shorter questionnaire. There is no legal requirement to hold a census within a given interval; in practice, the ICBS requests and the government decides. The next census is scheduled for 2022.

=== Japan ===
Since 1920, Japan has conducted Population Census to collect census information every five years, with the exceptions of the 6th in 1947 instead of 1945 and some extra censuses during 1944–1948. A large-scale census (in the years ending in the digit 0) and a simplified one (in those ending in 5) has been undertaken alternately. They collected information as of October 1. The Statistics Bureau is in charge of the exercise of censuses.

The questionnaires were frequently changed in the early history of the Population Census, but they were almost fixed by the 1970s. Since then, they include 16–23 topics, with a small difference between the large-scale censuses and the simplified ones. They solicit information such as name, gender, relationship to head of household, year and month of birth, marital status, nationality, number of the household members, type and tenure of dwelling, floor area of the dwelling, number of hours worked during the week prior to October 1, employment status, name of employer and type of business, kind of work, and the place of work or schooling. For the years ending in the digit 0, the questionnaire includes additional questions such as education, how long the respondent has lived at the current address, the place he/she lived five years ago, and the means of transportation to the workplace or school.

Regardless of nationality or legal status, all residents in Japan are required to complete the census. All information collected by the census is confidential and protected by the Statistics Act. Information provided by census can never be used for any investigation purposes such as immigration control, police investigation, tax collections and so on. After the census, all forms are destroyed.

For the first time in 2010, residents of Tokyo were given an option to complete the census questionnaires online in lieu of the conventional paper questionnaires. Unique ID and password were provided with the census form. Tokyo was chosen as the initial rollout for the online questionnaires due to the high concentration of people living in apartment buildings or gated communities, which restricts the access of census workers. The online options were made available across Japan from the 2015 census.

The 2020 census was conducted in midst of global COVID-19 pandemic and the Japanese government urged the residents to respond the census online. Those who are unable to respond online may complete and mail back the paper questionnaires. The online census questionnaires are available in Japanese, English, Simplified Chinese, Traditional Chinese, Korean, Vietnamese, Spanish, and Portuguese. The paper census form was only written in Japanese, but translation was available in 29 different languages upon request. Since 2020, administrative information can be used on limited basis, only to complete the number of persons from nonresponding households.

=== Jordan ===
The first population census after Jordanian independence in 1946 was taken in 1952. It only counted the number of people in households, and could therefore be considered only to be a housing census. The first complete census was taken in 1961, with further censuses taken in 1979, 1994, 2004 and 2015. The distribution of Palestinians and Jordanians within the population has been a politically sensitive issue since the Six-Day War in 1967.

=== Lebanon ===
No census has been conducted in Lebanon since 1932. It indicated a population of 861,399 Lebanese. Various estimates of the population have been taken since; in 1956 it was estimated a population of 1,411,416, with 54% Christian and 44% Muslim. Conducting a census since then has been complicated by various conflicts in the 1970s and 1980s, as well as by the sensitivity of religious issues.

=== Malaysia ===
The census in Malaysia is carried out every 10 years, like many nations, since 1960 (with the exception of the fourth census, which was carried out in 1991). The next census should be carried out in 2030. The most recent census was from July 7 to October 24, 2020.

=== Myanmar ===
A general census of population and housing has been conducted in years 1973, 1983, 2014 and 2024 with the 2024 Census data considered unreliable with a provisional count of 51.3 million. A decrease from 51.5 Million, with prelimeneary census being published in December 2024.

=== Nepal ===
Census in Nepal are taken by Central Bureau of Statistics. Population censuses are conducted every ten years in Nepal. The first was held in 1911 and the most recent was held in 2021. The census in 2021 is the first census of Federal Nepal.

=== Oman ===
Censuses have been taken in the Sultanate of Oman in 1993, 2003, 2010 and 2020.

=== Pakistan ===
The Census in Pakistan is a legally decennial census and a descriptive count of Pakistan's population on Census Day, and of their dwellings, conducted and supervised by the Pakistan Bureau of Statistics. The most recent census was the 2023 Pakistani census.

Map of Pakistan in Asia

Pakistani flag

Coat of arms of Pakistan

Demographic and historical evolution of the Pakistani population since the first official census carried out in 1951.
N.	Year	Population Pakistan	Population and Housing Census
20th century
1st	1951	33,740,167	1951 Pakistani census
2nd	1961	▲42,880,378	1961 Pakistani census
3rd	1972	▲65,309,340	1972 Pakistani census
4th	1981	▲84,253,644	1981 Pakistani census
5th	1998	▲132,352,279	1998 Pakistani census
21st century
6th	2017	▲207,684,626	2017 Pakistani census
7th	2023	▲241,499,431	2023 Pakistani census

=== Philippines ===
The census of the Philippines is enumerated every 5 years (beginning in 1960, except in 2005 where it was moved to 2007 due to budgetary constraints) and the results are used to allocate Congressional seats (congressional apportionment) and government program funding.

The census is performed by the Philippine Statistics Authority. The first official census in the Philippines was carried out by the Spanish government pursuant to a royal decree calling for the counting of persons living as of the midnight of December 31, 1877. The first door-to-door census was conducted in 1903 to fulfill Public Act 467 which was approved by the U.S. Congress in July 1902. The last national census was held in 2020. For years between the censuses, the PSA issues estimates made using surveys and statistical models.

Map of the Philippines in Asia

Philippine flag

Coat of arms of the Philippines

Demographic and historical evolution of the Philippine population since the first official census carried out in 1877.
N.	Year	Population Philippines	Population and Housing Census
19th century
1st	1877	5,567,685	1877 Philippine census
2nd	1887	▲5,984,727	1887 Philippine census
20th century
3rd	1903	▲7,635,426	1903 Philippine census
4th	1918	▲10,314,310	1918 Philippine census
5th	1939	▲16,000,303	1939 Philippine census
6th	1948	▲19,234,182	1948 Philippine census
7th	1960	▲27,087,685	1960 Philippine census
8th	1970	▲36,684,486	1970 Philippine census
9th	1975	▲42,070,660	1975 Philippine census
10th	1980	▲48,098,460	1980 Philippine census
11th	1990	▲60,703,206	1990 Philippine census
12th	1995	▲68,616,536	1995 Philippine census
21st century
13th	2000	▲76,506,928	2000 Philippine census
14th	2007	▲88,566,732	2007 Philippine census
15th	2010	▲92,337,852	2010 Philippine census
16th	2015	▲100,981,437	2015 Philippine census
17th	2020	▲109,035,343	2020 Philippine census
18th	2024	▲112,729,484	2024 Philippine census

=== Saudi Arabia ===
Population censuses have been taken in Saudi Arabia in 1962/63 (incomplete), 1974 (complete but not reliable), 1992, 2004, 2010 and 2022. An agriculture census was taken in 1999 and 2015.

=== Singapore ===
Population censuses have been taken in Singapore every ten years, in 1970, 1980, 1990, 2000, 2010 and 2020.

=== South Korea ===
South Korea had its first "modern" census in 1925.

The Census has been conducted 18 times every 5 years, most recently in 2020.

=== Sri Lanka ===
The census in Sri Lanka is carried out by the Department of Census and Statistics every 10 years, with the next one being planned for 2033. The 2011 one being the first post-war census in three decades. The census will cover all Grama Niladhari (GN) divisions of the country. The first scientific census in Sri Lanka was conducted on March 27, 1871. The last four were in 1963, 1971, 1981, 2001, 2012 and 2024 with a census estimate in 1989. The 2001 census was only carried out in 18 Districts due to the Sri Lankan Civil War.

Map of Sri Lanka in Asia

Sri Lankan flag

Coat of arms of Sri Lanka

Demographic and historical evolution of the Sri Lankan population since the first official census carried out in 1871.
N.	Year	Population Sri Lanka	Population and Housing Census
19th century
1st	1871	2,400,380	1871 Sri Lankan census
2nd	1881	▲2,759,738	1881 Sri Lankan census
3rd	1891	▲3,007,789	1891 Sri Lankan census
20th century
4th	1901	▲3,565,954	1901 Sri Lankan census
5th	1911	▲4,106,350	1911 Sri Lankan census
6th	1921	▲4,498,605	1921 Sri Lankan census
7th	1931	▲5,306,871	1931 Sri Lankan census
8th	1946	▲6,657,339	1946 Sri Lankan census
9th	1953	▲8,097,895	1953 Sri Lankan census
10th	1963	▲10,582,064	1963 Sri Lankan census
11th	1971	▲12,689,897	1971 Sri Lankan census
12th	1981	▲14,846,750	1981 Sri Lankan census
13th	1990	▲17,325,773	1990 Sri Lankan census
21st century
14th	2001	▲18,777,601	2001 Sri Lankan census
16th	2012	▲20,359,439	2012 Sri Lankan census
17th	2024	▲21,763,170	2024 Sri Lankan census

=== Syria ===
The first population census in Syria was taken by the French Mandatory Regime in 1921–22. This is however not considered reliable. Censuses during independence have been taken 1947, 1960 (the first comprehensive demographic investigation), 1970, 1976 (a sample census), 1981, 1994 and 2004 and the next would be taken at 2017.

=== Taiwan ===
The first census in Taiwan was conducted in 1905, while Taiwan was under Japanese rule.

=== Thailand ===
A census is conducted every 10 years, the latest being in 2020. The National Statistical Office of Thailand is in charge of conducting the census.

=== Turkey ===
The Turkish census is run by the Turkish Statistical Institute. The first census in Turkey was conducted in 1927. After 1935, it took place every 5 years until 1990. Now, the census takes place every 10 years. The last census was in 2000. It can be noted that the census enumeration takes place on one single day in Turkey (in other countries it takes 1–2 weeks). This required some 900,000 enumerators in 2000. The 15th census based on improved geographical information systems is planned for 2010.

A census was taken in the Ottoman Empire 1831–38 by Sultan Mahmud II (1808–1839) as a part of the reform movement Tanzimat. Christian and Jewish men were counted but the female population was excluded.

=== Uzbekistan ===
The last census in Uzbekistan was carried out in 1989 during Soviet rule. Uzbekistan itself will carry out their first post-Soviet census either in 2025 or 2026.

== Europe ==
=== Albania ===
The latest population census was conducted in Albania on September 18, 2023.

The previous census was conducted in September 2011. Prior to that, censuses were conducted in April 2001 and in 1989 at the end of the Communist regime.

Map of Albania in Europe

Albanian flag

Coat of arms of Albania

Demographic and historical evolution of the Albanian population since the first official census carried out in 1923.
N.	Year	Population Albania	Population and Housing Census
20th century
1st	1923	814,380	1923 Albanian Census
2nd	1930	▲833,618	1930 Albanian Census
3rd	1945	▲1,122,044	1945 Albanian Census
4th	1950	▲1,218,943	1950 Albanian Census
5th	1955	▲1,391,499	1955 Albanian Census
6th	1960	▲1,626,315	1960 Albanian Census
7th	1969	▲2,068,155	1969 Albanian Census
8th	1979	▲2,590,600	1979 Albanian Census
9th	1989	▲3,182,417	1989 Albanian Census
21st century
10th	2001	▼3,069,275	2001 Albanian Census
11th	2011	▼2,821,977	2011 Albanian Census
12th	2023	▼2,402,113	2023 Albanian Census

=== Austria ===
The Austrian census is run by Statistics Austria. It is carried out every ten years, the last one on October 31, 2011.

Map of Austria in Europe

Austrian flag

Coat of arms of Austria

Demographic and historical evolution of the Austrian population since the first official census carried out in 1869.
N.	Year	Population Austria	Population and Housing Census
19th century
1st	1869	4,497,880	1869 Austrian Census
2nd	1880	▲4,963,528	1880 Austrian Census
3rd	1890	▲5,417,360	1890 Austrian Census
20th century
4th	1900	▲6,003,845	1900 Austrian Census
5th	1910	▲6,648,310	1910 Austrian Census
6th	1934	▲6,760,044	1934 Austrian Census
7th	1951	▲6,933,905	1951 Austrian Census
8th	1961	▲7,073,807	1961 Austrian Census
9th	1971	▲7,491,526	1971 Austrian Census
10th	1981	▲7,555,338	1981 Austrian Census
11th	1991	▲7,795,786	1991 Austrian Census
21st century
12th	2001	▲8,032,926	2001 Austrian Census
13th	2011	▲8,401,940	2011 Austrian Census
14th	2021	▲8,969,068	2021 Austrian Census

=== Belgium ===
The Belgium census is run by Statistics Belgium. The first census was carried out in 1846. The last census was taken in 2011. This is the first registered based census.

Since 1968, the population number is permanently up to date through the National Register.

Map of Belgium in Europe

Belgian flag

Coat of arms of Belgium

Demographic and historical evolution of the Belgian population since the first official census carried out in 1846.
N.	Year	Population Belgium	Population and Housing Census
19th century
1st	1846	4,337,196	1846 Belgian Census
2nd	1856	▲4,529,460	1856 Belgian Census
3rd	1866	▲4,827,833	1866 Belgian Census
4th	1876	▲5,336,185	1876 Belgian Census
5th	1880	▲5,520,009	1880 Belgian Census
6th	1890	▲6,069,321	1890 Belgian Census
20th century
7th	1900	▲6,693,548	1900 Belgian Census
8th	1910	▲7,423,784	1910 Belgian Census
9th	1920	▲7,465,782	1920 Belgian Census
10th	1930	▲8,092,004	1930 Belgian Census
11th	1947	▲8,512,195	1947 Belgian Census
12th	1961	▲9,189,741	1961 Belgian Census
13th	1970	▲9,650,944	1970 Belgian Census
14th	1981	▲9,848,647	1981 Belgian Census
15th	1991	▲9,978,681	1991 Belgian Census
21st century
16th	2001	▲10,296,350	2001 Belgian Census
17th	2011	▲11,000,638	2011 Belgian Census
18th	2021	▲11,521,238	2021 Belgian Census

=== Bosnia and Herzegovina ===
Population censuses in Bosnia and Herzegovina were conducted in 1879, 1885, 1895, 1910, 1921, 1931, 1948, 1953, 1961, 1971, 1981 and 1991. The 2013 Census was organized in period between October 1–15, 2013. This is the first census after the end of the Bosnian War.

=== Bulgaria ===
Bulgarian governors organized a national census soon after the liberation of the Bulgarian lands. In 1881 a census took place in the Principality, while in 1884 a census was organized in Eastern Rumelia. The first census covering the unified state took place in 1887.

Since these first accounts, Bulgarian authorities had organized several population censuses: 1892, 1900, 1905, 1910, 1920, 1926, 1934, 1946, 1956, 1965, 1975, 1985, 1992, 2001, and 2011.

The data provided in the Bulgarian censuses from 1888 until World War II is regarded as highly reliable according to the standards of the time. The Bulgarian leading statisticians of the period were generally educated in Western universities and participated vividly in the international cooperation, therefore insisted and succeeded in introducing the best practices of the time. The quality of the data provided of later censuses is a matter of debate. The religion question in the 2001 census didn't allow the unaffiliated Bulgarians to be counted as such.

Map of Bulgaria in Europe

Bulgarian flag

Coat of arms of Bulgaria

Demographic and historical evolution of the Bulgarian population since the first official census carried out in 1880.
N.	Year	Population Bulgaria	Population and Housing Census
19th century
1st	1880	2,007,919	1880 Bulgarian Census
2nd	1887	▲3,154,375	1887 Bulgarian Census
3rd	1892	▲3,310,713	1892 Bulgarian Census
20th century
4th	1900	▲3,744,283	1900 Bulgarian Census
5th	1905	▲4,035,575	1905 Bulgarian Census
6th	1910	▲4,337,513	1910 Bulgarian Census
7th	1920	▲4,846,971	1920 Bulgarian Census
8th	1926	▲5,478,741	1926 Bulgarian Census
9th	1934	▲6,077,939	1934 Bulgarian Census
10th	1946	▲7,029,349	1946 Bulgarian Census
11th	1956	▲7,613,709	1956 Bulgarian Census
12th	1965	▲8,227,866	1965 Bulgarian Census
13th	1975	▲8,727,771	1975 Bulgarian Census
14th	1985	▲8,948,649	1985 Bulgarian Census
15th	1992	▼8,487,317	1992 Bulgarian Census
21st century
16th	2001	▼7,928,901	2001 Bulgarian Census
17th	2011	▼7,364,570	2011 Bulgarian Census
18th	2021	▼6,519,789	2021 Bulgarian Census

=== Croatia ===
The census in Croatia is carried out every 10 years. The last census was taken in 2021 with final population count of 3.9 million. The first census was in 1857 when what is now Croatia was part of the Austrian Empire.

=== Czech Republic ===
The census in the Czech Republic is carried out every 10 years by the Czech Statistical Office. The last census was taken in 2021. Earlier censuses were taken in 1869, 1880, 1890, 1900, 1910, 1921, 1930, 1950, 1961, 1970, 1980, 1991, 2001 and 2011.

The results of the last census are also available via the interactive model based software.

=== Denmark ===
The first Danish census was in 1700–1701, and contained statistical information about adult men. Only about half of it still exists. A census of school children was taken during the 1730s.

Following these early undertakings, the first census to attempt completely covering all citizens (including women and children who had previously been listed only as numbers) of Denmark-Norway was taken in 1769. At that point there were 797,584 citizens in the kingdom. Georg Christian Oeder took a statistical census in 1771 which covered Copenhagen, Sjælland, Møn, and Bornholm.

After that, censuses followed somewhat regularly in 1787, 1801, and 1834, and between 1840 and 1860, the censuses were taken every five years, and then every ten years until 1890. Special censuses for Copenhagen were taken in 1885 and 1895.

In the 20th century, censuses were taken every five years from 1901 to 1921, and then every ten years from 1930. The last traditional census was taken in 1970.

A limited population census based on registers was taken in 1976. From 1981 and each year onwards information that corresponds to a population and housing census is retrieved from registers. Denmark was the first country in the world to conduct these censuses from administrative registers. The most important registers are the Population Register (Det Centrale Personregister), the Building and Dwelling Register (Bygnings- og Boligregistret) and the Enterprise Register (Det Centrale Virksomhedsregister). The central statistical office, Statistics Denmark is responsible for compiling these data. This information is available online in the Statbank Denmark.

It is possible to search a portion of the Danish censuses online at the Dansk Demografisk Database, and also view scanned versions at Arkivalier Online.

=== Estonia ===
Population censuses have been carried out in 1881, 1897, 1922, 1934, 1959, 1970, 1979, 1989, 2000 and 2011.

The censuses of 1881 and 1897 were carried out during the reign of the Russian Empire, when Estonia was divided between the Governorate of Estonia and the Governorate of Livonia. The latter also included territories of modern-day Latvia, however its Estonian-populated counties of Võru, Tartu, Viljandi, Pärnu and Saaremaa roughly corresponded to the later borders of the Republic of Estonia. Only later Estonian territories of Valga, Narva, Jaanilinn and Petseri County remained outside these figures.

The 1922 and 1934 censuses were carried out by the independent Republic of Estonia. The 1959, 1979 and 1989 censuses were carried out by the Estonian SSR of the Soviet Union and excluded Jaanilinn and Petseri County, which were annexed by the Russian SFSR in 1945. The 2000 and 2011 censuses were again carried out by the independent Republic of Estonia and also excluded the territories annexed by Russia in 1945. The current responsible institution is the Statistics Estonia.

=== Finland ===
The first population census was taken in 1749 when Finland was a part of Sweden. Although the parliament authorized a modern census in 1938, it was not undertaken until 1950. Finland has an accurate population registry system, thus censuses are in practice conducted by studying the registry, rather than as a separate project. Statistics Finland publishes various statistics on population: preliminary population statistics are published monthly, population structure report is published annually and population projections every three years. Once in ten years, the official locations and demarcations for densely populated areas (taajama) for traffic purposes, and official numbers of the speakers of national languages (Finnish or Swedish), for bilinguality, are reviewed.

=== France ===
The census in France is currently carried out by INSEE. The first census in France was conducted in 1801. Since 2004, a partial census has been carried out every year, and the results published as averages over 5 years.

=== Germany ===
The first systematic population on the European continent was taken in 1719 in Prussia (roughly corresponding to today's northern Germany and western Poland).

The first large-scale census in the German Empire took place in 1895. Attempts at introducing a census in West Germany sparked strong popular resentment in the 1980s since many quite personal questions were asked. Some campaigned for a boycott. In the end the Constitutional Court stopped the census in 1980 and 1983. The last census of West Germany was in 1987. Germany has since used population samples in combination with statistical methods, in place of a full census. But finally, on May 9, 2011, a new census of Germany was completed.

=== Greece ===
Census takes place every 10 years and is carried out by the National Statistical Service of Greece. The 2011 census ended on 24 May.

=== Hungary ===
Official decennial censuses have been taken in Hungary since 1870; the latest one – in line with the recommendations of the United Nations and the Statistical Office of the European Union – was carried out in 2011. Starting from 1880 the Hungarian census system was based on native language (the language spoken at home in the early life of the person and at the time of the survey), vulgar language (the most frequently used language in the family), and other spoken languages.

=== Iceland ===
The first Icelandic census took place in 1703, following upon the first Danish census of 1700–1701. Further censuses were carried out in 1801, 1845 and 1865. The 1703 exercise was the first census ever to cover all inhabitants of an entire country, mentioning the name, age, and social position of each individual. All of the information still exists, although some of the original documents have been lost.

The need for censuses was eliminated through the setting up, in 1952, of the National Registry (Þjóðskrá), which later merged with other entities to form Registers Iceland. All those born in Iceland, and all new residents, are automatically registered. Individuals are identified in the registry by means of a national identification number (the so-called kennitala), a number composed of the date of birth in the format ddmmyy and four additional digits, the third of which is a control digit, and the last of which indicates the century in which the person was born (9 for the 1900s and 0 for the 2000s).

The National Registry doubles as an electoral register. Likewise, all bank accounts are linked to the national identification of the owner (companies and institutions all have their own identification numbers).

=== Ireland ===
Population censuses covering all of Ireland were conducted every ten years from 1821 to 1911 inclusive. The first census following independence was conducted in 1926 and done every ten years until 1946. Since then, most censuses have been conducted every five years from 1951 to 2011 with two exceptions. Instead of censuses in 1976 and 2001, they were instead conducted in 1979 and 2002 respectively. The next census is scheduled for 2022, having been postponed from 2021 due to the COVID-19 pandemic. All original census returns from 1901 onwards survive, together with some 19th century fragments.

The census in Ireland is carried out by the Central Statistics Office. The census is taken every five years, with more detailed information collected in years ending in 1 and less in the years ending in 6. The 1976 census was cancelled as a cost-saving measure, but a supplementary census was held in 1979 after it became apparent that the 1970s had seen major demographic changes. The census scheduled for 2001 was postponed until 2002 due to the outbreak of foot-and-mouth disease.

Data from the 1901 Census of Ireland and the 1911 census of Ireland were first made publicly available in 1961. Subsequent census records will be made available 100 years after collection. The 1901 and 1911 census returns, together with the 19th century fragments, are freely available to view at the National Archives of Ireland website.

=== Italy ===
The census in Italy is carried out by ISTAT every 10 years. The last five were in 1971, 1981, 1991, 2001 and 2011. From 2018, the census will be done every year, using a sample of population to correct databases that ISTAT create from registry offices and other public offices.

Map of Italy in Europe

Italian flag

Emblem of Italy

Demographic and historical evolution of the Italian population since the first official census carried out in 1861.
N.	Year	Population Italy	Population and Housing Census
19th century
1st	1861	22,176,477	1861 Italian Census
2nd	1871	▲27,299,883	1871 Italian Census
3rd	1881	▲28,951,546	1881 Italian Census
20th century
4th	1901	▲32,963,316	1901 Italian Census
5th	1911	▲35,841,563	1911 Italian Census
6th	1921	▲39,396,757	1921 Italian Census
7th	1931	▲41,043,489	1931 Italian Census
8th	1936	▲42,398,489	1936 Italian Census
9th	1951	▲47,515,537	1951 Italian Census
10th	1961	▲50,623,569	1961 Italian Census
11th	1971	▲54,136,547	1971 Italian Census
12th	1981	▲56,556,911	1981 Italian Census
13th	1991	▲56,778,031	1991 Italian Census
21st century
14th	2001	▲56,995,744	2001 Italian Census
15th	2011	▲59,433,744	2011 Italian Census
16th	2021	▼59,030,133	2021 Italian Census

=== Kosovo ===
Kosovo declared independence on 17 February 2008. Then, the Kosovo Agency of Statistics organized the first census of the new country in 2011.

The most recent census was done in April and May 2024.

=== Latvia ===
The most recent census in Latvia was in 2011. Before that, most censuses were conducted under Soviet control. The census is carried out by the Centrālā Statistikas Pārvalde (Central Statistical Bureau).

=== Netherlands ===
The first census in the Netherlands was conducted in 1795, and the last in 1971. A law was produced on April 22, 1879, ordering a census to be conducted every ten years.

The census that was planned for 1981 was postponed and later cancelled. A call for privacy was responsible for the cancellation of any further census since 1991. Censuses are being conducted by the Centraal Bureau voor de Statistiek since 1899. The censuses today are mostly (population, fiscal) register based, combined with surveying.

=== North Macedonia ===
The independence of the Republic of North Macedonia followed the breakup of former Yugoslavia in 1991. The first population and housing census was conducted in the summer of 1994. The second census was conducted in the autumn of 2002. Both censuses were observed by international experts due to the sensitive issue regarding the ethnic distribution. The next census operation started in 2011 but it was aborted with the census declared unsuccessful. Following delay, a census was conducted in September 2021, which also included the diaspora.

=== Norway ===
The two first male censuses was conducted during the 1660s and 1701. Later statistical censuses were held in 1769, 1815, 1835, 1845, and 1855. Norway's first nominative, complete census was taken in 1801, when Norway still was ruled by the Oldenburg dynasty of Denmark-Norway. The scope of the census followed the de jure principle, so military persons should be included as well as foreigners if they were residents. The 1801, 1865, 1900 and 1910 censuses are transcribed and made searchable on the internet. The census records are made publicly available when 100 years have passed. Since 1900, a census has been conducted every ten years. (However, the 1940 census was postponed to 1946, and the census after 1990 came in 2001.) Since 2001 the population census has been combined with the housing statistics. The 2001 questionnaire only asked about households and who was living in them, while no questionnaires will be mailed out for the 2011 census, since the administrative data on households is sufficient.

=== Poland ===
The census in Poland is carried out by GUS approximately every 10 years. The 2002 census was conducted between 21 May and June 8. Poland's most recent census was held in 2011. The next census is scheduled for 2021.

=== Portugal ===
The first systematic census in Portugal was carried out on January 1, 1864. The census in Portugal is carried out by Instituto Nacional de Estatística (INE) every 10 years. The last census was taken on March 21, 2011.

=== Romania ===
The first census in Romania was carried out in 1859. It is now carried out every ten years by the Institutul Naţional de Statistică (INSSE). The last census was in 2011.

Map of Romania in Europe

Romanian flag

Coat of arms of Romania

Demographic and historical evolution of the Romanian population since the first official census carried out in 1866.
N.	Year	Population Romania	Population and Housing Census
19th century
1st	1866	4,424,961	1866 Romanian Census
2nd	1887	▲5,500,000	1887 Romanian Census
3rd	1899	▲5,956,690	1899 Romanian Census
20th century
4th	1912	▲7,234,919	1912 Romanian Census
5th	1930	▲18,057,028	1930 Romanian Census
6th	1941	▼13,535,757	1941 Romanian Census
7th	1948	▲15,872,624	1948 Romanian Census
8th	1956	▲17,489,450	1956 Romanian Census
9th	1966	▲19,103,163	1966 Romanian Census
10th	1977	▲21,559,910	1977 Romanian Census
11th	1992	▲22,810,035	1992 Romanian Census
21st century
12th	2002	▼21,680,974	2002 Romanian Census
13th	2011	▼20,121,641	2011 Romanian Census
14th	2021	▼19,053,815	2021 Romanian Census

=== Russia and USSR ===
In Russia, the first census of the tax-payers was made in 1722–1723 by the order of Peter the Great (only men were counted), and was ordered to be repeated every twenty years. The only complete Russian Empire Census was carried out in 1897. All-Union Population Censuses were carried out in the USSR (which included RSFSR and the other republics) in 1920 (urban only), 1926, 1937, 1939, 1959, 1970, 1979, and 1989. The first post-Soviet Russian Census was carried out in 2002, followed by the 2010 Census. Currently, the census is the responsibility of the Federal State Statistics Service.

=== San Marino ===
Parish priests in San Marino maintained 'libri d'anime' or 'books of souls' as a population register between 1634 and 1860. The first general population census was conducted in 1865. Further censuses were held in 1874, 1899, 1947, and 1976. The Ufficio Informatica, Tecnologia, Dati e Statistica conducted the sixth population census on 7 November 2010.

=== Serbia ===
The census ordinarily takes place every 10 years. The last census was in 2011, the previous one was in 2002 (although having been planned for 2001) and the next is planned for 2021. The censuses before were organized in 1991, 1981, 1971, 1961, 1953 and 1948, during Communist Yugoslavia. During the Kingdom of Yugoslavia, censuses were conducted in 1931 and 1921; the census in 1941 was never conducted due to the outbreak of WWII.

The autonomous Principality of Serbia, had conducted the first population census in 1834; the subsequent censuses were conducted in 1841, 1843, 1846, 1850, 1854, 1859, 1863 and 1866 and 1874. During the era of the independent Kingdom of Serbia, six censuses were conducted starting in 1884 and the last one being in 1910. And then the frequent wars had prevented organizing any census prior to the Yugoslav one in 1921.

For the portions of Serbia ruled by Austria-Hungary until 1918, there were a total of five Austro-Hungarian censuses—1910, 1900, 1890, 1880 and 1869, immediately after the Dual Monarchy's constitution.

=== Slovakia ===
First modern census in the area of today's Slovakia was taken in 1869. Today, the census is conducted every 10 years by the Statistical Office of Slovak Republic. Last census was in May 2021.

=== Slovenia ===
The first census of modern Slovenia was carried in 1991, after independence had been declared. The Statistical Office of the Republic of Slovenia conducted the second census in 2002. Further censuses were carried out in 2011 and then every 10 years.

=== Spain ===
The census in Spain is carried out by INE every 10 years. Although there has been an old tradition and like for making census in Spain, the oldest ones dating back to the 12th century (by Alfonso VII of the Kingdom of Castile), the first modern census was carried out in 1768 by Conde de aranda, under the reign of Carlos III. The last five were in 1971, 1981, 1991, 2001, and 2011.

=== Sweden ===
The first population census in Sweden was carried out in 1749. The last population and housing census was carried out in 1990. It is planned to conduct population and housing censuses based on registers in the future.

=== Switzerland ===
In Switzerland, the Federal Population Census (German: Eidgenössische Volkszählung, French: Recensement fédéral de la population, Italian: Censimento federale della popolazione, Romansh: Dumbraziun federala dal pievel) has been carried out every 10 years starting in 1850. The census was initiated by Federal Councillor Stefano Franscini, who evaluated the data of the first census all by himself after Parliament failed to provide the necessary funds. The census is now being conducted by the Swiss Federal Statistical Office.

Data collected include population data (citizenship, place of residence, place of birth, position in household, number of children, religion, languages, education, profession, place of work, etc.), household data (number of individuals living in the household, etc.), accommodation data (surface area, amount of rent paid, etc.) and building data (geocoordinates, time of construction, number of floors, etc.). Participation is compulsory and reached 99.87% of the population in 2000.

Since 2010, the population census has been carried out and analysed annually in a new format by the Federal Statistical Office (FSO). To ease the burden on the population, the information is primarily drawn from population registers and supplemented by sample surveys. Only a small proportion of the population (about 5%) is surveyed in writing or by telephone. The first reference day for the new census was December 31, 2010.

=== Ukraine ===
The first post-Soviet Ukrainian Census was carried out by State Statistics Committee of Ukraine in 2001, 12 years after the last All-Union census in 1989.

=== United Kingdom ===
In the seventh century, Dál Riata was the first territory in what is now the UK to conduct a census. The Domesday Book of 1086 in England contained listings of households but its coverage was not complete and its intent was not the same as modern censuses.

Following the influence of Malthus and concerns stemming from his An Essay on the Principle of Population the UK census as we know it today started in 1801. The census has been conducted every ten years since 1801.

The first four censuses (1801–1831) were mainly headcounts and contained little personal information. The 1841 Census, conducted by the General Register Office, was the first to record the names of everyone in a household or institution. From 1851 onwards the census shows the stated age and relationship to the head of household for each individual. Because of World War II, there was no census in 1941. The actual census dates were 6 June 1841, 30 March 1851, 7 April 1861, 2 April 1871, 3 April 1881, 5 April 1891, 31 March 1901, 27 March 1911.

The census of England & Wales is undertaken for the government by the Office for National Statistics (ONS). The General Register Office for Scotland (GROS) conducts its own census, while the census in Northern Ireland is carried out by the Northern Ireland Statistics and Research Agency (NISRA). Public access to the census returns is restricted under the terms of the 100-year rule. The most recent returns made available to researchers are those of the 1921 census.

The most recent UK census took place in England, Wales and Northern Ireland on 21 March 2021. Because of the COVID-19 pandemic the census in Scotland was delayed to 20 March 2022. It was revealed that the 2021 UK Census could be the last census conducted, as Prof Sir Ian Diamond said in early 2020 that he is "hopeful" other, newer data sources could replace the British census, adding "better and more granular" sources in a "cheaper" and "more timely" way could replace the 2021 census. A 2018 UK Government white paper said its "ambition" is for "other sources of data" to be used following the 2021 census.

== Oceania ==
=== Australia ===
The Australian census is operated by the Australian Bureau of Statistics. It is currently conducted every five years, the last occurrence being on August 10, 2021. Past Australian censuses were conducted in 1911, 1921, 1933, 1947, 1954, and every five years since 1961. In 2016, for the first time, Australians were able to complete their census online.

=== New Zealand ===
The census in New Zealand is carried out by Statistics New Zealand (Tatauranga Aotearoa), usually every five years. The 1951 census was the first year in which Māori and European New Zealanders were treated equally, with European New Zealanders having had a different census form in previous years and separate censuses in the 19th century. Results for those censuses before 1966 have been destroyed with a few exceptions and those since will not be available before 2066.

For the 2001, 2006 and 2013 Censuses of New Zealand, respondents could choose to complete their census questionnaire online. The census was scheduled on 8 March 2011. However, it was cancelled due to the September 2010 and February 2011 Canterbury earthquake. The 1931 census was also cancelled due to the effects of the Great Depression, and was the 1941 census due to the Second World War.

A census was instead held on 5 March 2013. For the 2018 census, online participation was prioritised, with paper forms available upon request.

The most recent census was conducted on 7 March 2023.

== See also ==
- List of national and international statistical services
- Demography
- IBM and the Holocaust, a book
- Intercensal estimate
- Liber Censuum
- Official statistics
- Race and ethnicity in censuses
- Social research
