= 2024 Chilean census =

XX National Population Census and IX Housing Census
- 9 March – 31 July 2024

General information
- Country: Chile
- Authority: National Statistics Institute

Results
- Total population: 18480432 (▲5.16%)
- Most populous Region: Santiago Metropolitan Region
- Least populous Region: Aysén Region

The 2024 Chilean Population and Housing Census (Spanish: Censo Chileno de Población y Vivienda 2024), officially the XX National Population Census and IX Housing Census (Spanish: XX Censo Nacional de Población y IX de Vivienda), was organized by the National Statistics Institute and took place between 9 March and 31 July 2024.

== Background ==
=== 2012 census ===
The 2024 census was the third in 15 years. The first of them, the 2012 census was executed in a "de jure" methodology, meaning the number of people in the country was registered into the census based on people's usual residence, even if they were not present there at the time. This method was criticized due to its inaccuracy, omitting an estimated 10% of the total population, with some communes reporting a 20% omission rate.

=== 2017 Census ===
The April 2017 census, which used a "de facto" methodology, recorded an increase in the population between 2012 and 2017, with the official population standing at 17574003 people.

== Census ==
=== Delays ===
The census was originally set to take in April 2022. However, the National Statistics Institute announced a delay in October 2020 due to sanitary restrictions imposed during the COVID-19 pandemic, delaying it to March 2023. In 2022, the census was delayed a second time, due to logistical and planning problems, with the new census set to take place between March and July 2024.

=== Methodology ===
For the 2024 census, the Chilean government decided to use the "de jure" methodology again. The census consisted of a 50 question questionnaire, which was in both a physical and digital format to allow for a broader coverage. Nearly 25000 people carried out the census between 2 phases. The first, which took place between March 9 and June 2, censed 179 of the 346 communes. The second phase started in early May, with the objective of censing the remaining 1.7% of the country which could not be censed in the first phase. The census ended on 31 July 2024 after nearly 5 months.

== Results ==
The National Statistics Institute published the results of the census in late March 2025. The total population censed was 18480432, a 5.16% increase since the 2017 census. The region with the highest population was the Santiago Metropolitan region, with 7400741 people, while the region with the lowest population was Aysén region, with 100745 people, the only region to experience a (small) loss in population between 2017 and 2024, while the Magallanes and Chilean Antarctica region was virtually unchanged at 166,537 people. There were five regions with over a million people, those being the Santiago Metropolitan, Valparaiso, Biobio, Maule and Araucania regions.

Population results by Region
Region	Population (2017 census)	Population (2024 census)	Increase
Arica and Parinacota	226,068	244,569	▲8.18%
Tarapacá	330,558	369,806	▲11.9%
Antofagasta	607,534	635,416	▲4.6%
Atacama	286,168	299,180	▲4.5%
Coquimbo	757,586	832,864	▲9.9%
Valparaíso	1,815,902	1,896,053	▲4.5%
Santiago Metropolitan	7,112,808	7,400,741	▲4%
O'Higgins	914,555	987,228	▲7.9%
Maule	1,044,915	1,123,008	▲7.6%
Ñuble	480,609	512,289	▲6.6%
Biobío	1,556,805	1,613,059	▲3.7%
Araucanía	957,224	1,010,423	▲4.5%
Los Ríos	384,837	398,230	▲3.5%
Los Lagos	828,708	890,284	▲7.4%
Aysén	103,158	100,745	▼2.3%
Magallanes and Chilean Antarctica	166,533	166,537	▲0.002%
Chile (Total)	17,574,003	18,480,432	▲5.16%
