= 2001 Census =

2001 census may refer to a census covered by:

- Census in Australia#2001
- 2001 Bangladesh census
- 2001 Bolivian census
- Canada 2001 Census
- 2001 census of Croatia
- 2001 Census of India
- Lithuanian census of 2001
- 2001 Nepal census
- 2001 New Zealand census
- South African National Census of 2001
- Ukrainian Census (2001)
- United Kingdom Census 2001
