= 1994 Moroccan census =

Census

1994 census of Morocco
- 1994

General information
- Country: Morocco
- Authority: High Commission for Planning
- Website: www.hcp.ma

Results
- Total population: 26,073,717 (▲27.69%)

The 1994 Moroccan census was conducted by the High Planning Commission. The previous census was taken in 1982, and the next one in 2004.
