= 2004 Moroccan census =

Census in Morocco

2004 census of Morocco
- 2004

General information
- Country: Morocco
- Authority: High Commission for Planning
- Website: www.hcp.ma/Recensement-population-RGPH-2004_a2942.html

Results
- Total population: 29,891,708 (▲14.64%)

The 2004 Moroccan census, formally the General Population and Housing Census for the year 2004, was conducted by the High Planning Commission.

Since the previous census in 1994 the annual population growth rate sank to 1.4% compared to 2.1% between 1982 and 1994. News outlets attribute this change to the increase in the age of marriage, unemployment and the increased use of contraception.
