= 1976 Bolivian census =

Eighth Census of Bolivia
← 1950	1976	1992 →

General information
- Country: Bolivia

Results
- Total population: 4,613,486

The Eighth Census of Bolivia is the national census of Bolivia conducted in 1976. The population was 4,613,486.
