= 2012 Chilean census =

Census in Chile

XVIII Censo Nacional de Población y VII de Vivienda
- 9 April – 15 July 2012

General information
- Country: Chile
- Authority: National Statistics Institute

Results
- Total population: 16,634,603 (9.4%)

The XVIII National Population Census and VII Housing Census or Population and Housing Census 2012 (Spanish: XVIII Censo Nacional de Población y VII de Vivienda o Censo de Población y Vivienda 2012) was a population census that was carried out in Chile between April 9 and July 15, 2012, and whose objective was to update the data recorded in the census carried out ten years earlier, in April 2002. Its preparation was the responsibility of the National Statistics Institute of Chile (INE).

The final census results were published on April 2, 2013, tallying a national total of 16,634,603 inhabitants; however, they were later removed. Finally, in September 2014, the National Institute of Statistics published a new figure based on projections from the 2002 Census, which yielded an estimated total of 17,819,054 inhabitants; The data from the 2012 census were subsequently discarded due to a series of problems in obtaining and processing the data.

Other countries in the Americas that conducted censuses during 2012 included Cuba, Honduras, Guyana and Paraguay.

== Background ==
In mid-2010, the INE conducted a pre-census in the commune of Vicuñain the Coquimbo Region, to implement a preliminary survey design.

The census model underwent a review process between March and September 2011.

=== Final figures ===
Indicator	Amount	%
Total men	8,101,890	48.705
Total women	8,532,713	51.295
Total urban	14,462,858	86.944
Total rural	2,171,745	13.056
Population total	16,634,603	100

== Controversies ==
=== Methodology ===
Law 17374 states that the census must be carried out in one day, and that this day must be declared a holiday, so the new mechanism was left in a dubious legal position. In fact, Decree 143 of the Ministry was reviewed by the Comptroller's Office, which explained this situation.

=== Alleged manipulation of the numbers ===
On April 26, 2013, it was reported that the director of INE, Francisco Labbé Opazo, allegedly manipulated the 2012 Census figures in a scandal that ended with his resignation.

In March 2014, it was reported that the government of Michelle Bachelet would conduct a new "abbreviated" census, a matter that was confirmed in June, and that took place in April 2017.
