= 1992 Bolivian census =

Ninth Census of Bolivia
← 1976	1992	2001 →

General information
- Country: Bolivia

Results
- Total population: 6,420,792

The Ninth Census of Bolivia is the national census of Bolivia conducted in 1992. The population was 6,420,792.
