= 2001 Bolivian census =

Tenth Census of Bolivia
| ← 1992 | 5 September 2001 | 2012 → |

General information
- Country: Bolivia

Results
- Total population: 8,274,325 (▲2.86%)

The Tenth Census of Bolivia was conducted on 5 September 2001. The population was 8,274,325.
