= 2017 Chilean census =

National census

XIX National Population Census and VIII Housing Census
- 19 April 2017
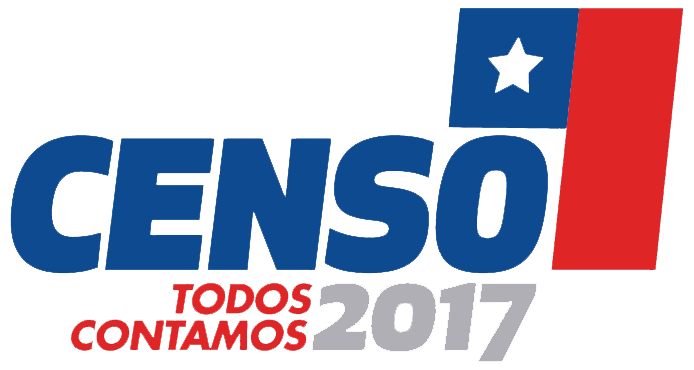

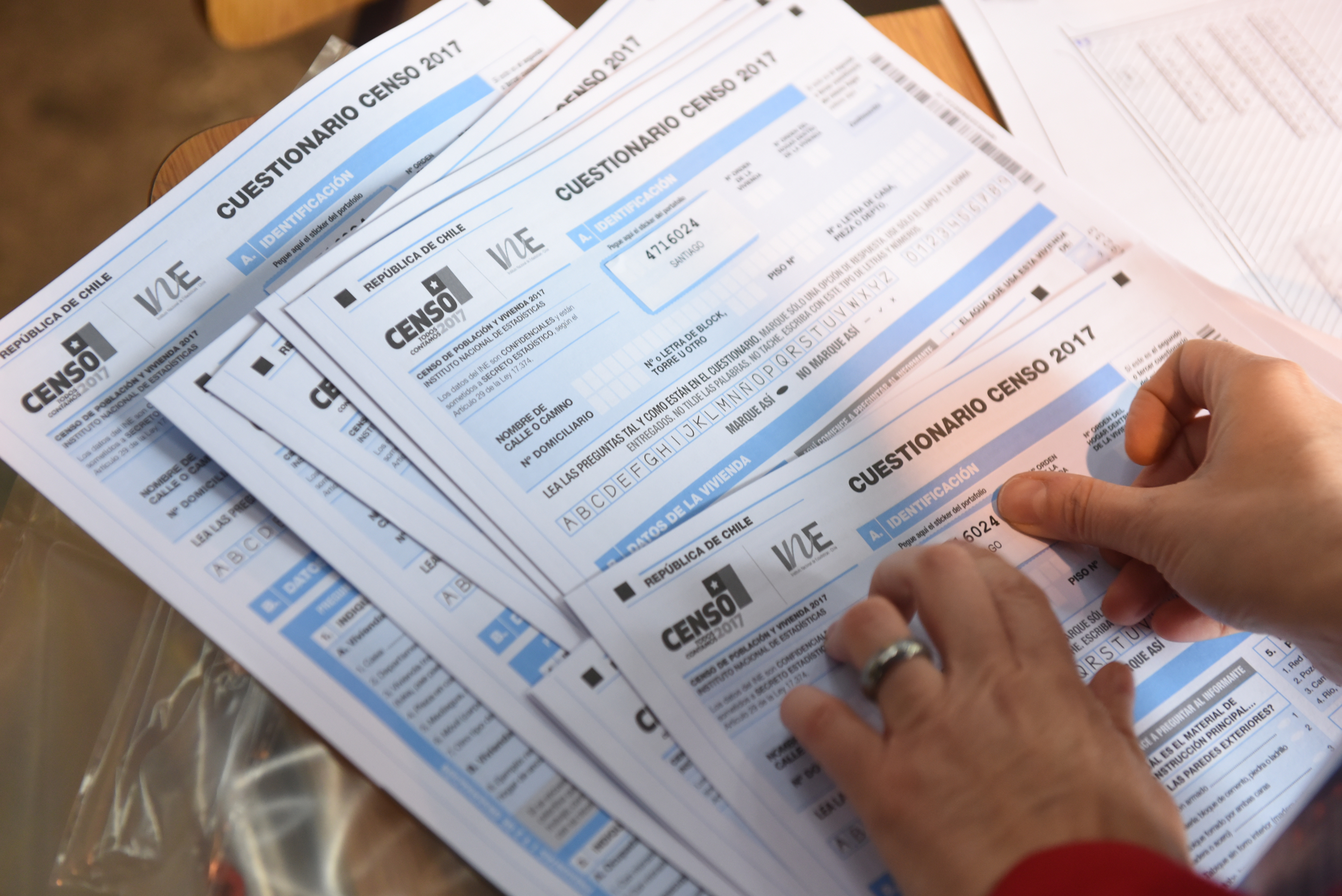
- Census questionnaire

General information
- Country: Chile

Results
- Total population: 17 574 003 (▲5,6%)
- Most populous Region: Santiago Metropolitan Region
- Least populous Region: Aysén Region

The 2017 Chilean Population and Housing Census (Spanish: Censo Chileno de Población y Vivienda 2017), officially the XIX National Population Census and VIII Housing Census (Spanish: XIX Censo Nacional de Población y VIII de Vivienda), took place on 19 April 2017, and was organized by the National Statistics Institute.

== Census ==
The census took place on 19 April 2017, starting at 08:00 in the morning, and by 10:00 in the morning, according to a joint statement by Minister of Economy Luis Felipe Céspedes and the director of the National Statistics Institute Ximena Clark, over 75% of local people were entered into the system. People who were not censed by the end of the day could fill up the questionnaire either in physical form or via a digital platform in later dates.

Multiple attacks against census workers were reported in cities like Santiago and Coquimbo. The most severe of these was an attack against census workers in Temucuicui, where the census was suspended due to the attack. Due to heavy rain in Northern Chile, census data forms related to 72,000 homes in the Atacama Region, amounting to 60% of the region's total population and 72% of the region's housing, were damaged, which caused the National Statistics Institute to consider reconducting the census in the affected communes.

== Questionnaire ==
The census questionnaire consisted of 21 questions among four sections; the A section, which is filled in by the censist and consists of housing identification, the B section, which consists of the data of the housing itself, with the first two questions being filled by the censist, the C section, which consists of two questions identifying the people living in the housing, and the D section, which asks about the personal information of the residents of the housing.

The census was translated into six languages aside from Spanish: Mapudungun, English, French, German, Portuguese and Haitian Creole.

== Results ==
In late August 2017, the preliminary results of the census were published, showing a population of 17,574,003 people between 6,499,355 homes (or approximately 2.7 people per home), a 5.6% increase in population since the 2012 census.

Results by region
| Region | Population |
|---|---|
| Arica and Parinacota | 226,068 |
| Tarapacá | 330,558 |
| Antofagasta | 607,534 |
| Atacama | 286,168 |
| Coquimbo | 757,586 |
| Valparaíso | 1,815,902 |
| Santiago Metropolitan | 7,112,808 |
| O'Higgins | 914,555 |
| Maule | 1,044,915 |
| Ñuble | 480,609 |
| Biobío | 1,556,805 |
| Araucanía | 957,224 |
| Los Ríos | 384,837 |
| Los Lagos | 828,708 |
| Aysén | 103,158 |
| Magallanes and Chilean Antarctica | 166,533 |
| Chile (Total) | 17,574,003 |
