= 2000 census =

The following countries conducted a census of the general population in 2000:

- Fifth National Population Census of the People's Republic of China
- Costa Rica 2000 Census, the ninth federal census, conducted at irregular intervals
- 2000 Estonia Census
- Indonesia 2000 census
- 2000 Panamanian census
- 2000 Turkish census
- 2000 United States census, the 22nd decennial federal census
