= 1892 Costa Rican census =

Costa Rica 1892 Census
- 18 February 1892

General information
- Country: Costa Rica

Results
- Total population: 243,205 (▲33.58%)
- Most populous canton: San José; 39,112
- Least populous canton: Bagaces; 1,476

Historical population
Census	Pop.	±% p.a.
1864	120,499	—
1883	182,073	+2.20%
1892	243,205	+3.27%
1927	471,524	+1.91%
1950	800,875	+2.33%
1963	1,336,274	+4.02%
1973	1,871,780	+3.43%
1984	2,416,809	+2.35%
2000	3,810,179	+2.89%
2011	4,301,712	+1.11%
2022	5,044,197	+1.46%
Source: Instituto Nacional de Estadística y Censos; Centro Centroamericano de Población

The Costa Rica 1892 census was elaborated by then Dirección General de Estadística y Censos, predecessor of current National Institute of Statistics and Census. The total population was at the moment 243,205.

== Results by canton ==
Province	Canton	Population as of 1892 census	Population as of 1883 census	Change	Percent change
San José	San José	39,112	30,123	8,989 ▲	29.84% ▲
San José	Escazú	6,522	5,550	972 ▲	17.51% ▲
San José	Desamparados	6,471	5,408	1,063 ▲	19.66% ▲
San José	Puriscal	6,845	1,942	4,903 ▲	252.47% ▲
San José	Tarrazú	2,583	1,378	1,205 ▲	87.45% ▲
San José	Aserrí	6,030	4,785	1,245 ▲	26.02% ▲
San José	Mora	5,814	6,976	−1,162 ▼	-16.66% ▼
San José	Goicoechea	3,341	-	-	-
Alajuela	Alajuela	19,300	15,247	4,053 ▲	26.58% ▲
Alajuela	San Ramón	9,928	10,111	−183 ▼	-1.81% ▼
Alajuela	Grecia	8,797	7,178	1,619 ▲	22.56% ▲
Alajuela	San Mateo	3,353	2,525	828 ▲	32.79% ▲
Alajuela	Atenas	6,208	5,551	657 ▲	11.84% ▲
Alajuela	Naranjo	6,847	4,593	2,254 ▲	49.07% ▲
Alajuela	Palmares	2,770	-	-	-
Cartago	Cartago	25,898	20,398	5,500 ▲	26.96% ▲
Cartago	Paraíso	7,819	7,114	705 ▲	9.91% ▲
Cartago	La Unión	4,256	2,916	1,340 ▲	45.95% ▲
Heredia	Heredia	16,480	16,452	28 ▲	0.17% ▲
Heredia	Barva	2,964	2,663	301 ▲	11.30% ▲
Heredia	Santo Domingo	5,118	4,254	864 ▲	20.31% ▲
Heredia	Santa Bárbara	2,845	2,449	396 ▲	16.17% ▲
Heredia	San Rafael	4,204	-	-	-
Guanacaste	Liberia	5,883	4,744	1,139 ▲	24.01% ▲
Guanacaste	Nicoya	4,577	3,824	753 ▲	19.69% ▲
Guanacaste	Santa Cruz	5,948	4,748	1,200 ▲	25.27% ▲
Guanacaste	Bagaces	1,476	991	485 ▲	48.94% ▲
Guanacaste	Cañas	2,165	595	1,570 ▲	263.87% ▲
Puntarenas	Puntarenas	8,869	4,018	4,851 ▲	120.73% ▲
Puntarenas	Esparza	3,298	2,441	857 ▲	35.11% ▲
Limón	Limón	7,484	1,858	5,626 ▲	302.80% ▲
