= 1963 Costa Rican census =

Costa Rica 1963 Census
- 1 April 1963

General information
- Country: Costa Rica

Results
- Total population: 1,336,274 (▲66.85%)
- Most populous canton: San José; 168,938
- Least populous canton: San Mateo; 3,388

Historical population
Census	Pop.	±% p.a.
1864	120,499	—
1883	182,073	+2.20%
1892	243,205	+3.27%
1927	471,524	+1.91%
1950	800,875	+2.33%
1963	1,336,274	+4.02%
1973	1,871,780	+3.43%
1984	2,416,809	+2.35%
2000	3,810,179	+2.89%
2011	4,301,712	+1.11%
2022	5,044,197	+1.46%
Source: Instituto Nacional de Estadística y Censos; Centro Centroamericano de Población

The Costa Rica 1963 census was elaborated by then Dirección General de Estadística y Censos, predecessor of current National Institute of Statistics and Census. The total population was at the moment 1,336,274.

== Results by canton ==
Province	Cantón	Population as of 1963 census	Population as of 1950 census	Change	Percent change
San José	San José	168,938	111,820	57,118 ▲	51.08% ▲
San José	Escazú	14,250	7,141	7,109 ▲	99.55% ▲
San José	Desamparados	33,845	15,614	18,231 ▲	116.76% ▲
San José	Puriscal	23,690	16,743	6,947 ▲	41.49% ▲
San José	Tarrazú	5,392	7,435	−2,043 ▼	-27.48% ▼
San José	Aserrí	13,609	9,122	4,487 ▲	49.19% ▲
San José	Mora	8,938	7,736	1,202 ▲	15.54% ▲
San José	Goicoechea	44,110	21,093	23,017 ▲	109.12% ▲
San José	Santa Ana	9,026	5,812	3,214 ▲	55.30% ▲
San José	Alajuelita	10,848	3,920	6,928 ▲	176.73% ▲
San José	Vázquez de Coronado	10,615	6,124	4,491 ▲	73.33% ▲
San José	Acosta	13,092	10,160	2,932 ▲	28.86% ▲
San José	Tibás	23,946	10,594	13,352 ▲	126.03% ▲
San José	Moravia	11,642	5,727	5,915 ▲	103.28% ▲
San José	Montes de Oca	24,043	9,916	14,127 ▲	142.47% ▲
San José	Turrubares	5,496	5,937	−441 ▼	-7.43% ▼
San José	Dota	3,718	2,801	917 ▲	32.74% ▲
San José	Curridabat	9,491	4,497	4,994 ▲	111.05% ▲
San José	Pérez Zeledón	47,319	19,630	27,689 ▲	141.05% ▲
San José	León Cortés Castro	5,650	-	-	-
Alajuela	Alajuela	64,398	37,376	27,022 ▲	72.30% ▲
Alajuela	San Ramón	25,925	19,951	5,974 ▲	29.94% ▲
Alajuela	Grecia	43,923	23,571	20,352 ▲	86.34% ▲
Alajuela	San Mateo	3,388	3,611	−223 ▼	-6.18% ▼
Alajuela	Atenas	11,018	9,313	1,705 ▲	18.31% ▲
Alajuela	Naranjo	16,414	10,839	5,575 ▲	51.43% ▲
Alajuela	Palmares	12,283	7,934	4,349 ▲	54.81% ▲
Alajuela	Poás	8,179	5,135	3,044 ▲	59.28% ▲
Alajuela	Orotina	7,093	5,951	1,142 ▲	19.19% ▲
Alajuela	San Carlos	36,586	16,180	20,406 ▲	126.12% ▲
Alajuela	Zarcero	4,919	4,676	243 ▲	5.20% ▲
Alajuela	Sarchí	6,546	4,313	2,233 ▲	51.77% ▲
Cartago	Cartago	46,722	30,763	15,959 ▲	51.88% ▲
Cartago	Paraíso	18,389	11,426	6,963 ▲	60.94% ▲
Cartago	La Unión	14,074	7,789	6,285 ▲	80.69% ▲
Cartago	Jiménez	10,439	7,731	2,708 ▲	35.03% ▲
Cartago	Turrialba	37,620	24,466	13,154 ▲	53.76% ▲
Cartago	Alvarado	6,465	4,597	1,868 ▲	40.64% ▲
Cartago	Oreamuno	12,035	7,568	4,467 ▲	59.02% ▲
Cartago	El Guarco	9,689	6,385	3,304 ▲	51.75% ▲
Heredia	Heredia	30,919	19,898	11,021 ▲	55.39% ▲
Heredia	Barva	8,504	5,263	3,241 ▲	61.58% ▲
Heredia	Santo Domingo	11,348	7,346	4,002 ▲	54.48% ▲
Heredia	Santa Bárbara	8,127	5,044	3,083 ▲	61.12% ▲
Heredia	San Rafael	9,069	5,254	3,815 ▲	72.61% ▲
Heredia	San Isidro	4,061	2,849	1,212 ▲	42.54% ▲
Heredia	Belén	4,781	3,226	1,555 ▲	48.20% ▲
Heredia	Flores	4,162	2,880	1,282 ▲	44.51% ▲
Heredia	San Pablo	4,092	-	-	-
Guanacaste	Liberia	18,030	10,246	7,784 ▲	75.97% ▲
Guanacaste	Nicoya	36,276	29,918	6,358 ▲	21.25% ▲
Guanacaste	Santa Cruz	23,576	13,615	9,961 ▲	73.16% ▲
Guanacaste	Bagaces	9,836	4,079	5,757 ▲	141.14% ▲
Guanacaste	Carrillo	11,396	7,002	4,394 ▲	62.75% ▲
Guanacaste	Cañas	9,117	5,929	3,188 ▲	53.77% ▲
Guanacaste	Abangares	10,189	8,344	1,845 ▲	22.11% ▲
Guanacaste	Tilarán	12,097	9,057	3,040 ▲	33.57% ▲
Guanacaste	Nandayure	12,038	-	-	-
Puntarenas	Puntarenas	55,592	31,074	24,518 ▲	78.90% ▲
Puntarenas	Esparza	9,175	6,902	2,273 ▲	32.93% ▲
Puntarenas	Buenos Aires	11,042	7,392	3,650 ▲	49.38% ▲
Puntarenas	Montes de Oro	6,616	5,595	1,021 ▲	18.25% ▲
Puntarenas	Osa	17,574	11,518	6,056 ▲	52.58% ▲
Puntarenas	Quepos	19,942	15,291	4,651 ▲	30.42% ▲
Puntarenas	Golfito	36,567	10,396	26,171 ▲	251.74% ▲
Limón	Limón	40,141	23,337	16,804 ▲	72.01% ▲
Limón	Pococí	16,927	10,482	6,445 ▲	61.49% ▲
Limón	Siquirres	11,317	7,541	3,776 ▲	50.07% ▲
