= 1950 Costa Rican census =

Costa Rica 1950 Census
- 22 May 1950

General information
- Country: Costa Rica

Results
- Total population: 800,875 (▲69.85%)
- Most populous canton: San José; 111,820
- Least populous canton: Dota; 2801

Historical population
Census	Pop.	±% p.a.
1864	120,499	—
1883	182,073	+2.20%
1892	243,205	+3.27%
1927	471,524	+1.91%
1950	800,875	+2.33%
1963	1,336,274	+4.02%
1973	1,871,780	+3.43%
1984	2,416,809	+2.35%
2000	3,810,179	+2.89%
2011	4,301,712	+1.11%
2022	5,044,197	+1.46%
Source: Instituto Nacional de Estadística y Censos; Centro Centroamericano de Población

The Costa Rica 1950 census was elaborated by then Dirección General de Estadística y Censos, predecessor of current National Institute of Statistics and Census. The total population was at the moment 800,875.

== Results by canton ==
Province	Cantón	Population as of 1950 census	Population as of 1927 census	Change	Percent change
San José	San José	111,820	62,053	49,767 ▲	80.20% ▲
San José	Escazú	7,141	5,113	2,028 ▲	39.66% ▲
San José	Desamparados	15,614	9,463	6,151 ▲	65.00% ▲
San José	Puriscal	16,743	13,329	3,414 ▲	25.61% ▲
San José	Tarrazú	7,435	5,734	1,701 ▲	29.67% ▲
San José	Aserrí	9,122	6,592	2,530 ▲	38.38% ▲
San José	Mora	7,736	7,925	−189 ▼	-2.38% ▼
San José	Goicoechea	21,093	6,496	14,597 ▲	224.71% ▲
San José	Santa Ana	5,812	3,785	2,027 ▲	53.55% ▲
San José	Alajuelita	3,920	2,571	1,349 ▲	52.47% ▲
San José	Vázquez de Coronado	6,124	4,161	1,963 ▲	47.18% ▲
San José	Acosta	10,160	7,474	2,686 ▲	35.94% ▲
San José	Tibás	10,594	4,579	6,015 ▲	131.36% ▲
San José	Moravia	5,727	2,778	2,949 ▲	106.16% ▲
San José	Montes de Oca	9,916	3,676	6,240 ▲	169.75% ▲
San José	Turrubares	5,937	2,742	3,195 ▲	116.52% ▲
San José	Dota	2,801	4,712	−1,911 ▼	-40.56% ▼
San José	Curridabat	4,497	-	-	-
San José	Pérez Zeledón	19,630	-	-	-
Alajuela	Alajuela	37,376	25,656	11,720 ▲	45.68% ▲
Alajuela	San Ramón	19,951	13,805	6,146 ▲	44.52% ▲
Alajuela	Grecia	23,571	16,130	7,441 ▲	46.13% ▲
Alajuela	San Mateo	3,611	3,234	377 ▲	11.66% ▲
Alajuela	Atenas	9,313	7,631	1,682 ▲	22.04% ▲
Alajuela	Naranjo	10,839	7,910	2,929 ▲	37.03% ▲
Alajuela	Palmares	7,934	6,683	1,251 ▲	18.72% ▲
Alajuela	Poás	5,135	3,570	1,565 ▲	43.84% ▲
Alajuela	Orotina	5,951	4,151	1,800 ▲	43.36% ▲
Alajuela	San Carlos	16,180	5,719	10,461 ▲	182.92% ▲
Alajuela	Zarcero	4,676	3,088	1,588 ▲	51.42% ▲
Alajuela	Sarchí	4,313	-	-	-
Cartago	Cartago	30,763	26,909	3,854 ▲	14.32% ▲
Cartago	Paraíso	11,426	7,900	3,526 ▲	44.63% ▲
Cartago	La Unión	7,789	4,972	2,817 ▲	56.66% ▲
Cartago	Jiménez	7,731	5,892	1,839 ▲	31.21% ▲
Cartago	Turrialba	24,466	15,814	8,652 ▲	54.71% ▲
Cartago	Alvarado	4,597	3,568	1,029 ▲	28.84% ▲
Cartago	Oreamuno	7,568	5,143	2,425 ▲	47.15% ▲
Cartago	El Guarco	6,385	-	-	-
Heredia	Heredia	19,898	12,667	7,231 ▲	57.09% ▲
Heredia	Barva	5,263	3,482	1,781 ▲	51.15% ▲
Heredia	Santo Domingo	7,346	6,089	1,257 ▲	20.64% ▲
Heredia	Santa Bárbara	5,044	3,997	1,047 ▲	26.19% ▲
Heredia	San Rafael	5,254	4,163	1,091 ▲	26.21% ▲
Heredia	San Isidro	2,849	2,744	105 ▲	3.83% ▲
Heredia	Belén	3,226	2,782	444 ▲	15.96% ▲
Heredia	Flores	2,880	2,483	397 ▲	15.99% ▲
Guanacaste	Liberia	10,246	7,322	2,924 ▲	39.93% ▲
Guanacaste	Nicoya	29,918	11,005	18,913 ▲	171.86% ▲
Guanacaste	Santa Cruz	13,615	10,390	3,225 ▲	31.04% ▲
Guanacaste	Bagaces	4,079	1,890	2,189 ▲	115.82% ▲
Guanacaste	Carrillo	7,002	5,364	1,638 ▲	30.54% ▲
Guanacaste	Cañas	5,929	3,500	2,429 ▲	69.40% ▲
Guanacaste	Abangares	8,344	5,540	2,804 ▲	50.61% ▲
Guanacaste	Tilarán	9,057	6,131	2,926 ▲	47.72% ▲
Puntarenas	Puntarenas	31,074	14,746	16,328 ▲	110.73% ▲
Puntarenas	Esparza	6,902	5,314	1,588 ▲	29.88% ▲
Puntarenas	Buenos Aires	7,392	-	-	-
Puntarenas	Montes de Oro	5,595	4,312	1,283 ▲	29.75% ▲
Puntarenas	Osa	11,518	4,367	7,151 ▲	163.75% ▲
Puntarenas	Quepos	15,291	-	-	-
Puntarenas	Golfito	10,396	-	-	-
Limón	Limón	23,337	22,424	913 ▲	4.07% ▲
Limón	Pococí	10,482	2,974	7,508 ▲	252.45% ▲
Limón	Siquirres	7,541	6,880	661 ▲	9.61% ▲
