= 1973 Costa Rican census =

Costa Rica 1973 Census
- 1973

General information
- Country: Costa Rica

Results
- Total population: 1,871,780 (▲40.07%)
- Most populous canton: San José; 215,441
- Least populous canton: San Mateo; 2,969

Historical population
Census	Pop.	±% p.a.
1864	120,499	—
1883	182,073	+2.20%
1892	243,205	+3.27%
1927	471,524	+1.91%
1950	800,875	+2.33%
1963	1,336,274	+4.02%
1973	1,871,780	+3.43%
1984	2,416,809	+2.35%
2000	3,810,179	+2.89%
2011	4,301,712	+1.11%
2022	5,044,197	+1.46%
Source: Instituto Nacional de Estadística y Censos; Centro Centroamericano de Población

The Costa Rica 1973 census was elaborated by then Dirección General de Estadística y Censos, predecessor of current National Institute of Statistics and Census. The total population was at the moment 1,871,780.

== Results by canton ==
Province	Cantón	Population as of 1973 census	Population as of 1963 census	Change	Percent change
San José	San José	215,441	168,938	46,503 ▲	27.53% ▲
San José	Escazú	25,026	14,250	10,776 ▲	75.62% ▲
San José	Desamparados	74,272	33,845	40,427 ▲	119.45% ▲
San José	Puriscal	24,150	23,690	460 ▲	1.94% ▲
San José	Tarrazú	7,542	5,392	2,150 ▲	39.87% ▲
San José	Aserrí	20,091	13,609	6,482 ▲	47.63% ▲
San José	Mora	10,733	8,938	1,795 ▲	20.08% ▲
San José	Goicoechea	61,607	44,110	17,497 ▲	39.67% ▲
San José	Santa Ana	14,499	9,026	5,473 ▲	60.64% ▲
San José	Alajuelita	23,013	10,848	12,165 ▲	112.14% ▲
San José	Vázquez de Coronado	16,336	10,615	5,721 ▲	53.90% ▲
San José	Acosta	14,385	13,092	1,293 ▲	9.88% ▲
San José	Tibás	35,602	23,946	11,656 ▲	48.68% ▲
San José	Moravia	19,548	11,642	7,906 ▲	67.91% ▲
San José	Montes de Oca	33,633	24,043	9,590 ▲	39.89% ▲
San José	Turrubares	4,709	5,496	−787 ▼	-14.32% ▼
San José	Dota	4,375	3,718	657 ▲	17.67% ▲
San José	Curridabat	15,591	9,491	6,100 ▲	64.27% ▲
San José	Pérez Zeledón	67,089	47,319	19,770 ▲	41.78% ▲
San José	León Cortés Castro	7,521	5,650	1,871 ▲	33.12% ▲
Alajuela	Alajuela	96,325	64,398	31,927 ▲	49.58% ▲
Alajuela	San Ramón	33,155	25,925	7,230 ▲	27.89% ▲
Alajuela	Grecia	31,806	43,923	−12,117 ▼	-27.59% ▼
Alajuela	San Mateo	2,969	3,388	−419 ▼	-12.37% ▼
Alajuela	Atenas	12,610	11,018	1,592 ▲	14.45% ▲
Alajuela	Naranjo	19,721	16,414	3,307 ▲	20.15% ▲
Alajuela	Palmares	14,495	12,283	2,212 ▲	18.01% ▲
Alajuela	Poás	10,191	8,179	2,012 ▲	24.60% ▲
Alajuela	Orotina	8,479	7,093	1,386 ▲	19.54% ▲
Alajuela	San Carlos	54,952	36,586	18,366 ▲	50.20% ▲
Alajuela	Zarcero	6,342	4,919	1,423 ▲	28.93% ▲
Alajuela	Sarchí	8,707	6,546	2,161 ▲	33.01% ▲
Alajuela	Upala	15,971	-	-	-
Alajuela	Los Chiles	5,596	-	-	-
Alajuela	Guatuso	4,713	-	-	-
Cartago	Cartago	65,310	46,722	18,588 ▲	39.78% ▲
Cartago	Paraíso	22,281	18,389	3,892 ▲	21.16% ▲
Cartago	La Unión	23,352	14,074	9,278 ▲	65.92% ▲
Cartago	Jiménez	11,523	10,439	1,084 ▲	10.38% ▲
Cartago	Turrialba	43,202	37,620	5,582 ▲	14.84% ▲
Cartago	Alvarado	7,484	6,465	1,019 ▲	15.76% ▲
Cartago	Oreamuno	17,517	12,035	5,482 ▲	45.55% ▲
Cartago	El Guarco	14,030	9,689	4,341 ▲	44.80% ▲
Heredia	Heredia	36,487	30,919	5,568 ▲	18.01% ▲
Heredia	Barva	12,864	8,504	4,360 ▲	51.27% ▲
Heredia	Santo Domingo	17,423	11,348	6,075 ▲	53.53% ▲
Heredia	Santa Bárbara	10,738	8,127	2,611 ▲	32.13% ▲
Heredia	San Rafael	16,013	9,069	6,944 ▲	76.57% ▲
Heredia	San Isidro	5,979	4,061	1,918 ▲	47.23% ▲
Heredia	Belén	8,538	4,781	3,757 ▲	78.58% ▲
Heredia	Flores	6,524	4,162	2,362 ▲	56.75% ▲
Heredia	San Pablo	6,660	4,092	2,568 ▲	62.76% ▲
Heredia	Sarapiquí	12,618	-	-	-
Guanacaste	Liberia	21,781	18,030	3,751 ▲	20.80% ▲
Guanacaste	Nicoya	37,185	36,276	909 ▲	2.51% ▲
Guanacaste	Santa Cruz	29,739	23,576	6,163 ▲	26.14% ▲
Guanacaste	Bagaces	9,828	9,836	−8 ▼	-0.08% ▼
Guanacaste	Carrillo	14,893	11,396	3,497 ▲	30.69% ▲
Guanacaste	Cañas	12,779	9,117	3,662 ▲	40.17% ▲
Guanacaste	Abangares	11,633	10,189	1,444 ▲	14.17% ▲
Guanacaste	Tilarán	12,563	12,097	466 ▲	3.85% ▲
Guanacaste	Nandayure	12,058	12,038	20 ▲	0.17% ▲
Guanacaste	La Cruz	8,333	-	-	-
Guanacaste	Hojancha	7,899	-	-	-
Puntarenas	Puntarenas	65,562	55,592	9,970 ▲	17.93% ▲
Puntarenas	Esparza	12,095	9,175	2,920 ▲	31.83% ▲
Puntarenas	Buenos Aires	20,104	11,042	9,062 ▲	82.07% ▲
Puntarenas	Montes de Oro	6,979	6,616	363 ▲	5.49% ▲
Puntarenas	Osa	24,613	17,574	7,039 ▲	40.05% ▲
Puntarenas	Quepos	14,473	19,942	−5,469 ▼	-27.42% ▼
Puntarenas	Golfito	42,510	36,567	5,943 ▲	16.25% ▲
Puntarenas	Coto Brus	19,971	-	-	-
Puntarenas	Parrita	11,901	-	-	-
Limón	Limón	40,830	40,141	689 ▲	1.72% ▲
Limón	Pococí	28,688	16,927	11,761 ▲	69.48% ▲
Limón	Siquirres	18,133	11,317	6,816 ▲	60.23% ▲
Limón	Talamanca	5,431	-	-	-
Limón	Matina	10,489	-	-	-
Limón	Guácimo	11,572	-	-	-
