= 1984 Costa Rican census =

Costa Rica 1984 Census
- 1984

General information
- Country: Costa Rica

Results
- Total population: 2,416,809 (▲29.12%)
- Most populous canton: San José; 241,464
- Least populous canton: Garabito; 3,144

Historical population
Census	Pop.	±% p.a.
1864	120,499	—
1883	182,073	+2.20%
1892	243,205	+3.27%
1927	471,524	+1.91%
1950	800,875	+2.33%
1963	1,336,274	+4.02%
1973	1,871,780	+3.43%
1984	2,416,809	+2.35%
2000	3,810,179	+2.89%
2011	4,301,712	+1.11%
2022	5,044,197	+1.46%
Source: Instituto Nacional de Estadística y Censos; Centro Centroamericano de Población

The Costa Rica 1984 census was elaborated by then Dirección General de Estadística y Censos, predecessor of current National Institute of Statistics and Census. The total population was at the moment 2,416,809.

== Results by canton ==
Province	Cantón	Population as of 1984 census	Population as of 1973 census	Change	Percent change
San José	San José	241,464	215,441	26,023 ▲	12.08% ▲
San José	Escazú	33,101	25,026	8,075 ▲	32.27% ▲
San José	Desamparados	108,824	74,272	34,552 ▲	46.52% ▲
San José	Puriscal	23,123	24,150	−1,027 ▼	-4.25% ▼
San José	Tarrazú	8,845	7,542	1,303 ▲	17.28% ▲
San José	Aserrí	30,588	20,091	10,497 ▲	52.25% ▲
San José	Mora	12,584	10,733	1,851 ▲	17.25% ▲
San José	Goicoechea	79,931	61,607	18,324 ▲	29.74% ▲
San José	Santa Ana	19,605	14,499	5,106 ▲	35.22% ▲
San José	Alajuelita	31,390	23,013	8,377 ▲	36.40% ▲
San José	Vázquez de Coronado	24,514	16,336	8,178 ▲	50.06% ▲
San José	Acosta	14,853	14,385	468 ▲	3.25% ▲
San José	Tibás	57,693	35,602	22,091 ▲	62.05% ▲
San José	Moravia	33,038	19,548	13,490 ▲	69.01% ▲
San José	Montes de Oca	39,065	33,633	5,432 ▲	16.15% ▲
San José	Turrubares	4,471	4,709	−238 ▼	-5.05% ▼
San José	Dota	4,934	4,375	559 ▲	12.78% ▲
San José	Curridabat	31,954	15,591	16,363 ▲	104.95% ▲
San José	Pérez Zeledón	82,370	67,089	15,281 ▲	22.78% ▲
San José	León Cortés Castro	8,087	7,521	566 ▲	7.53% ▲
Alajuela	Alajuela	127,472	96,325	31,147 ▲	32.34% ▲
Alajuela	San Ramón	39,963	33,155	6,808 ▲	20.53% ▲
Alajuela	Grecia	38,361	31,806	6,555 ▲	20.61% ▲
Alajuela	San Mateo	3,783	2,969	814 ▲	27.42% ▲
Alajuela	Atenas	15,011	12,610	2,401 ▲	19.04% ▲
Alajuela	Naranjo	23,588	19,721	3,867 ▲	19.61% ▲
Alajuela	Palmares	17,815	14,495	3,320 ▲	22.90% ▲
Alajuela	Poás	13,939	10,191	3,748 ▲	36.78% ▲
Alajuela	Orotina	10,494	8,479	2,015 ▲	23.76% ▲
Alajuela	San Carlos	75,576	54,952	20,624 ▲	37.53% ▲
Alajuela	Zarcero	7,005	6,342	663 ▲	10.45% ▲
Alajuela	Sarchí	10,716	8,707	2,009 ▲	23.07% ▲
Alajuela	Upala	26,061	15,971	10,090 ▲	63.18% ▲
Alajuela	Los Chiles	11,404	5,596	5,808 ▲	103.79% ▲
Alajuela	Guatuso	6,774	4,713	2,061 ▲	43.73% ▲
Cartago	Cartago	87,125	65,310	21,815 ▲	33.40% ▲
Cartago	Paraíso	27,823	22,281	5,542 ▲	24.87% ▲
Cartago	La Unión	41,005	23,352	17,653 ▲	75.60% ▲
Cartago	Jiménez	11,861	11,523	338 ▲	2.93% ▲
Cartago	Turrialba	50,567	43,202	7,365 ▲	17.05% ▲
Cartago	Alvarado	8,338	7,484	854 ▲	11.41% ▲
Cartago	Oreamuno	24,145	17,517	6,628 ▲	37.84% ▲
Cartago	El Guarco	20,807	14,030	6,777 ▲	48.30% ▲
Heredia	Heredia	54,896	36,487	18,409 ▲	50.45% ▲
Heredia	Barva	18,933	12,864	6,069 ▲	47.18% ▲
Heredia	Santo Domingo	23,985	17,423	6,562 ▲	37.66% ▲
Heredia	Santa Bárbara	16,643	10,738	5,905 ▲	54.99% ▲
Heredia	San Rafael	22,871	16,013	6,858 ▲	42.83% ▲
Heredia	San Isidro	8,528	5,979	2,549 ▲	42.63% ▲
Heredia	Belén	11,993	8,538	3,455 ▲	40.47% ▲
Heredia	Flores	9,015	6,524	2,491 ▲	38.18% ▲
Heredia	San Pablo	11,802	6,660	5,142 ▲	77.21% ▲
Heredia	Sarapiquí	18,909	12,618	6,291 ▲	49.86% ▲
Guanacaste	Liberia	28,067	21,781	6,286 ▲	28.86% ▲
Guanacaste	Nicoya	36,626	37,185	−559 ▼	-1.50% ▼
Guanacaste	Santa Cruz	31,133	29,739	1,394 ▲	4.69% ▲
Guanacaste	Bagaces	10,103	9,828	275 ▲	2.80% ▲
Guanacaste	Carrillo	18,475	14,893	3,582 ▲	24.05% ▲
Guanacaste	Cañas	17,284	12,779	4,505 ▲	35.25% ▲
Guanacaste	Abangares	12,575	11,633	942 ▲	8.10% ▲
Guanacaste	Tilarán	14,586	12,563	2,023 ▲	16.10% ▲
Guanacaste	Nandayure	9,604	12,058	−2,454 ▼	-20.35% ▼
Guanacaste	La Cruz	10,876	8,333	2,543 ▲	30.52% ▲
Guanacaste	Hojancha	5,879	7,899	−2,020 ▼	-25.57% ▼
Puntarenas	Puntarenas	74,135	65,562	8,573 ▲	13.08% ▲
Puntarenas	Esparza	14,998	12,095	2,903 ▲	24.00% ▲
Puntarenas	Buenos Aires	27,716	20,104	7,612 ▲	37.86% ▲
Puntarenas	Montes de Oro	7,444	6,979	465 ▲	6.66% ▲
Puntarenas	Osa	26,294	24,613	1,681 ▲	6.83% ▲
Puntarenas	Quepos	13,319	14,473	−1,154 ▼	-7.97% ▼
Puntarenas	Golfito	29,043	42,510	−13,467 ▼	-31.68% ▼
Puntarenas	Coto Brus	31,650	19,971	11,679 ▲	58.48% ▲
Puntarenas	Parrita	9,774	11,901	−2,127 ▼	-17.87% ▼
Puntarenas	Corredores	28,366	-	-	-
Puntarenas	Garabito	3,144	-	-	-
Limón	Limón	52,602	40,830	11,772 ▲	28.83% ▲
Limón	Pococí	44,187	28,688	15,499 ▲	54.03% ▲
Limón	Siquirres	29,079	18,133	10,946 ▲	60.37% ▲
Limón	Talamanca	11,013	5,431	5,582 ▲	102.78% ▲
Limón	Matina	14,723	10,489	4,234 ▲	40.37% ▲
Limón	Guácimo	16,472	11,572	4,900 ▲	42.34% ▲
