= 1883 Costa Rican census =

Costa Rica 1883 Census
- 30 November 1883

General information
- Country: Costa Rica

Results
- Total population: 182,073 (▲51.1%)
- Most populous canton: San José; 30,123
- Least populous canton: Cañas; 595

Historical population
Census	Pop.	±% p.a.
1864	120,499	—
1883	182,073	+2.20%
1892	243,205	+3.27%
1927	471,524	+1.91%
1950	800,875	+2.33%
1963	1,336,274	+4.02%
1973	1,871,780	+3.43%
1984	2,416,809	+2.35%
2000	3,810,179	+2.89%
2011	4,301,712	+1.11%
2022	5,044,197	+1.46%
Source: Instituto Nacional de Estadística y Censos; Centro Centroamericano de Población

The Costa Rica 1883 census was elaborated by then Dirección General de Estadística y Censos, predecessor of current National Institute of Statistics and Census. The total population was at the moment 182,073.

== Results by canton ==
Province	Canton	Population as of 1883 census	Population as of 1864 census	Change	Percent change
San José	San José	30,123	21,379	8,744 ▲	40.90% ▲
San José	Escazú	5,550	8,760	−3,210 ▼	-36.64% ▼
San José	Desamparados	5,408	7,067	−1,659 ▼	-23.48% ▼
San José	Puriscal	1,942	-	-	-
San José	Tarrazú	1,378	-	-	-
San José	Aserrí	4,785	-	-	-
San José	Mora	6,976	-	-	-
Alajuela	Alajuela	15,247	11,521	3,726 ▲	32.34% ▲
Alajuela	San Ramón	10,111	5,045	5,066 ▲	100.42% ▲
Alajuela	Grecia	7,178	5,738	1,440 ▲	25.10% ▲
Alajuela	San Mateo	2,525	1,682	843 ▲	50.12% ▲
Alajuela	Atenas	5,551	3,185	2,366 ▲	74.29% ▲
Alajuela	Naranjo	4,593	-	-	-
Cartago	Cartago	20,398	16,780	3,618 ▲	21.56% ▲
Cartago	Paraíso	7,114	4,238	2,876 ▲	67.86% ▲
Cartago	La Unión	2,916	2,046	870 ▲	42.52% ▲
Heredia	Heredia	16,452	14,073	2,379 ▲	16.90% ▲
Heredia	Barva	2,663	3,718	−1,055 ▼	-28.38% ▼
Heredia	Santo Domingo	4,254	-	-	-
Heredia	Santa Bárbara	2,449	-	-	-
Guanacaste	Liberia	4,744	3,169	1,575 ▲	49.70% ▲
Guanacaste	Nicoya	3,824	2,407	1,417 ▲	58.87% ▲
Guanacaste	Santa Cruz	4,748	3,217	1,531 ▲	47.59% ▲
Guanacaste	Bagaces	991	1,638	−647 ▼	-39.50% ▼
Guanacaste	Cañas	595	-	-	-
Puntarenas	Puntarenas	4,018	2,942	1,076 ▲	36.57% ▲
Puntarenas	Golfo Dulce, including Térraba and Boruca	1,241	931	310 ▲	33.29% ▲
Puntarenas	Esparza	2,441	-	-	-
Limón	Limón	1,858	-	-	-
