= National Institute of Statistics and Census of Costa Rica =

National Institute of Statistics and Census
- Instituto Nacional de Estadística y Censos

Autonomous institution overview
- Formed: 1861; 164 years ago
- Jurisdiction: Government of Costa Rica
- Headquarters: Edificio Ana Lorena, Calle Los Negritos, Mercedes, Montes de Oca; 9°56′17″N 84°03′33″W
- Autonomous institution executive: Ligia Jeannette Bermúdez Mesén, President
- Website: inec.cr

The National Institute of Statistics and Census of Costa Rica (Instituto Nacional de Estadística y Censos de Costa Rica, or INEC, in Spanish) is the governmental institution entrusted with the running of censuses and official surveys in the country. Its main office is in Mercedes district, in Montes de Oca.

== History ==
INEC was first called Oficina Central de Estadística and had its foundation in 1861. Later, in 1951, it was called Dirección General de Estadística y Censos until 1998, when INEC was its legal name. INEC ran its first census in 1864, and the latest was the 10th population and the 6th dwellings census, held in June 2011.

== Censuses in Costa Rica ==
- 1864. First Population Census.
- 1883. Second Population Census.
- 1892. Third Population Census.
- 1927. Fourth Population Census.
- 1950. Fifth Population Census.
- 1963. Sixth Population Census.
- 1973. Seventh Population Census.
- 1984. Eight Population Census.
- 2000. Ninth Population Census.
- 2011. Tenth Population Census.
- 2022. Eleventh Population Census.
