= 2000 Costa Rican census =

Costa Rica 2000 Census
- 28 June 2000

General information
- Country: Costa Rica

Results
- Total population: 3,810,179 (▲57.65%)
- Most populous canton: San José; 309,672
- Least populous canton: Turrubares; 4,877

Historical population
Census	Pop.	±% p.a.
1864	120,499	—
1883	182,073	+2.20%
1892	243,205	+3.27%
1927	471,524	+1.91%
1950	800,875	+2.33%
1963	1,336,274	+4.02%
1973	1,871,780	+3.43%
1984	2,416,809	+2.35%
2000	3,810,179	+2.89%
2011	4,301,712	+1.11%
2022	5,044,197	+1.46%
Source: Instituto Nacional de Estadística y Censos; Centro Centroamericano de Población

The 2000 Costa Rican census was undertaken by the National Institute of Statistics and Census (Instituto Nacional de Estadística y Censos (INEC)).

== Description ==
According to this census, Costa Rica had 3,810,179 inhabitants in 2000, a population density of 74.6/km^{2}, and 59% of the people lived in urban areas.

== Results by canton ==
Province	Cantón	Population as of 2000 census	Population as of 1984 census	Change	Percent change
San José	San José	309,672	241,464	68,208 ▲	28.25% ▲
San José	Escazú	52,372	33,101	19,271 ▲	58.22% ▲
San José	Desamparados	193,478	108,824	84,654 ▲	77.79% ▲
San José	Puriscal	29,407	23,123	6,284 ▲	27.18% ▲
San José	Tarrazú	14,160	8,845	5,315 ▲	60.09% ▲
San José	Aserrí	49,319	30,588	18,731 ▲	61.24% ▲
San José	Mora	21,666	12,584	9,082 ▲	72.17% ▲
San José	Goicoechea	117,532	79,931	37,601 ▲	47.04% ▲
San José	Santa Ana	34,507	19,605	14,902 ▲	76.01% ▲
San José	Alajuelita	70,297	31,390	38,907 ▲	123.95% ▲
San José	Vázquez de Coronado	55,585	24,514	31,071 ▲	126.75% ▲
San José	Acosta	18,661	14,853	3,808 ▲	25.64% ▲
San José	Tibás	72,074	57,693	14,381 ▲	24.93% ▲
San José	Moravia	50,419	33,038	17,381 ▲	52.61% ▲
San José	Montes de Oca	50,433	39,065	11,368 ▲	29.10% ▲
San José	Turrubares	4,877	4,471	406 ▲	9.08% ▲
San José	Dota	6,519	4,934	1,585 ▲	32.12% ▲
San José	Curridabat	60,889	31,954	28,935 ▲	90.55% ▲
San José	Pérez Zeledón	122,187	82,370	39,817 ▲	48.34% ▲
San José	León Cortés Castro	11,696	8,087	3,609 ▲	44.63% ▲
Alajuela	Alajuela	222,853	127,472	95,381 ▲	74.83% ▲
Alajuela	San Ramón	67,975	39,963	28,012 ▲	70.09% ▲
Alajuela	Grecia	65,119	38,361	26,758 ▲	69.75% ▲
Alajuela	San Mateo	5,343	3,783	1,560 ▲	41.24% ▲
Alajuela	Atenas	22,479	15,011	7,468 ▲	49.75% ▲
Alajuela	Naranjo	37,602	23,588	14,014 ▲	59.41% ▲
Alajuela	Palmares	29,766	17,815	11,951 ▲	67.08% ▲
Alajuela	Poás	24,764	13,939	10,825 ▲	77.66% ▲
Alajuela	Orotina	15,705	10,494	5,211 ▲	49.66% ▲
Alajuela	San Carlos	127,140	75,576	51,564 ▲	68.23% ▲
Alajuela	Zarcero	10,845	7,005	3,840 ▲	54.82% ▲
Alajuela	Sarchí	16,239	10,716	5,523 ▲	51.54% ▲
Alajuela	Upala	37,679	26,061	11,618 ▲	44.58% ▲
Alajuela	Los Chiles	19,732	11,404	8,328 ▲	73.03% ▲
Alajuela	Guatuso	13,045	6,774	6,271 ▲	92.57% ▲
Cartago	Cartago	132,057	87,125	44,932 ▲	51.57% ▲
Cartago	Paraíso	52,393	27,823	24,570 ▲	88.31% ▲
Cartago	La Unión	80,279	41,005	39,274 ▲	95.78% ▲
Cartago	Jiménez	14,046	11,861	2,185 ▲	18.42% ▲
Cartago	Turrialba	68,510	50,567	17,943 ▲	35.48% ▲
Cartago	Alvarado	12,290	8,338	3,952 ▲	47.40% ▲
Cartago	Oreamuno	39,032	24,145	14,887 ▲	61.66% ▲
Cartago	El Guarco	33,788	20,807	12,981 ▲	62.39% ▲
Heredia	Heredia	103,894	54,896	48,998 ▲	89.26% ▲
Heredia	Barva	32,440	18,933	13,507 ▲	71.34% ▲
Heredia	Santo Domingo	34,748	23,985	10,763 ▲	44.87% ▲
Heredia	Santa Bárbara	29,181	16,643	12,538 ▲	75.33% ▲
Heredia	San Rafael	37,293	22,871	14,422 ▲	63.06% ▲
Heredia	San Isidro	16,056	8,528	7,528 ▲	88.27% ▲
Heredia	Belén	19,834	11,993	7,841 ▲	65.38% ▲
Heredia	Flores	15,038	9,015	6,023 ▲	66.81% ▲
Heredia	San Pablo	20,813	11,802	9,011 ▲	76.35% ▲
Heredia	Sarapiquí	45,435	18,909	26,526 ▲	140.28% ▲
Guanacaste	Liberia	46,703	28,067	18,636 ▲	66.40% ▲
Guanacaste	Nicoya	42,189	36,626	5,563 ▲	15.19% ▲
Guanacaste	Santa Cruz	40,821	31,133	9,688 ▲	31.12% ▲
Guanacaste	Bagaces	15,972	10,103	5,869 ▲	58.09% ▲
Guanacaste	Carrillo	27,306	18,475	8,831 ▲	47.80% ▲
Guanacaste	Cañas	24,076	17,284	6,792 ▲	39.30% ▲
Guanacaste	Abangares	16,276	12,575	3,701 ▲	29.43% ▲
Guanacaste	Tilarán	17,871	14,586	3,285 ▲	22.52% ▲
Guanacaste	Nandayure	9,985	9,604	381 ▲	3.97% ▲
Guanacaste	La Cruz	16,505	10,876	5,629 ▲	51.76% ▲
Guanacaste	Hojancha	6,534	5,879	655 ▲	11.14% ▲
Puntarenas	Puntarenas	102,504	74,135	28,369 ▲	38.27% ▲
Puntarenas	Esparza	23,963	14,998	8,965 ▲	59.77% ▲
Puntarenas	Buenos Aires	40,139	27,716	12,423 ▲	44.82% ▲
Puntarenas	Montes de Oro	11,159	7,444	3,715 ▲	49.91% ▲
Puntarenas	Osa	25,861	26,294	−433 ▼	-1.65% ▼
Puntarenas	Quepos	20,188	13,319	6,869 ▲	51.57% ▲
Puntarenas	Golfito	33,823	29,043	4,780 ▲	16.46% ▲
Puntarenas	Coto Brus	40,082	31,650	8,432 ▲	26.64% ▲
Puntarenas	Parrita	12,112	9,774	2,338 ▲	23.92% ▲
Puntarenas	Corredores	37,274	28,366	8,908 ▲	31.40% ▲
Puntarenas	Garabito	10,378	3,144	7,234 ▲	230.09% ▲
Limón	Limón	89,933	52,602	37,331 ▲	70.97% ▲
Limón	Pococí	103,121	44,187	58,934 ▲	133.37% ▲
Limón	Siquirres	52,409	29,079	23,330 ▲	80.23% ▲
Limón	Talamanca	25,857	11,013	14,844 ▲	134.79% ▲
Limón	Matina	33,096	14,723	18,373 ▲	124.79% ▲
Limón	Guácimo	34,879	16,472	18,407 ▲	111.75% ▲
