= 1927 Costa Rican census =

Costa Rica 1927 Census
- 11 May 1927

General information
- Country: Costa Rica

Results
- Total population: 471,524 (▲93.89%)
- Most populous canton: San José; 62,053
- Least populous canton: Cañas; 1,890

Historical population
Census	Pop.	±% p.a.
1864	120,499	—
1883	182,073	+2.20%
1892	243,205	+3.27%
1927	471,524	+1.91%
1950	800,875	+2.33%
1963	1,336,274	+4.02%
1973	1,871,780	+3.43%
1984	2,416,809	+2.35%
2000	3,810,179	+2.89%
2011	4,301,712	+1.11%
2022	5,044,197	+1.46%
Source: Instituto Nacional de Estadística y Censos; Centro Centroamericano de Población

The Costa Rica 1927 census was elaborated by then Dirección General de Estadística y Censos, predecessor of current National Institute of Statistics and Census. The total population was at the moment 471,524.

== Results by canton ==
Province	Cantón	Population as of 1927 census	Population as of 1892 census	Change	Percent change
San José	San José	62,053	39,112	22,941 ▲	58.65% ▲
San José	Escazú	5,113	6,522	−1,409 ▼	-21.60% ▼
San José	Desamparados	9,463	6,471	2,992 ▲	46.24% ▲
San José	Puriscal	13,329	6,845	6,484 ▲	94.73% ▲
San José	Tarrazú	5,734	2,583	3,151 ▲	121.99% ▲
San José	Aserrí	6,592	6,030	562 ▲	9.32% ▲
San José	Mora	7,925	5,814	2,111 ▲	36.31% ▲
San José	Goicoechea	6,496	3,341	3,155 ▲	94.43% ▲
San José	Santa Ana	3,785	-	-	-
San José	Alajuelita	2,571	-	-	-
San José	Vázquez de Coronado	4,161	-	-	-
San José	Acosta	7,474	-	-	-
San José	Tibás	4,579	-	-	-
San José	Moravia	2,778	-	-	-
San José	Montes de Oca	3,676	-	-	-
San José	Turrubares	2,742	-	-	-
San José	Dota	4,712	-	-	-
Alajuela	Alajuela	25,656	19,300	6,356 ▲	32.93% ▲
Alajuela	San Ramón	13,805	9,928	3,877 ▲	39.05% ▲
Alajuela	Grecia	16,130	8,797	7,333 ▲	83.36% ▲
Alajuela	San Mateo	3,234	3,353	−119 ▼	-3.55% ▼
Alajuela	Atenas	7,631	6,208	1,423 ▲	22.92% ▲
Alajuela	Naranjo	7,910	6,847	1,063 ▲	15.53% ▲
Alajuela	Palmares	6,683	2,770	3,913 ▲	141.26% ▲
Alajuela	Poás	3,570	-	-	-
Alajuela	Orotina	4,151	-	-	-
Alajuela	San Carlos	5,719	-	-	-
Alajuela	Zarcero	3,088	-	-	-
Cartago	Cartago	26,909	25,898	1,011 ▲	3.90% ▲
Cartago	Paraíso	7,900	7,819	81 ▲	1.04% ▲
Cartago	La Unión	4,972	4,256	716 ▲	16.82% ▲
Cartago	Jiménez	5,892	-	-	-
Cartago	Turrialba	15,814	-	-	-
Cartago	Alvarado	3,568	-	-	-
Cartago	Oreamuno	5,143	-	-	-
Heredia	Heredia	12,667	16,480	−3,813 ▼	-23.14% ▼
Heredia	Barva	3,482	2,964	518 ▲	17.48% ▲
Heredia	Santo Domingo	6,089	5,118	971 ▲	18.97% ▲
Heredia	Santa Bárbara	3,997	2,845	1,152 ▲	40.49% ▲
Heredia	San Rafael	4,163	4,204	−41 ▼	-0.98% ▼
Heredia	San Isidro	2,744	-	-	-
Heredia	Belén	2,782	-	-	-
Heredia	Flores	2,483	-	-	-
Guanacaste	Liberia	7,322	5,883	1,439 ▲	24.46% ▲
Guanacaste	Nicoya	11,005	4,577	6,428 ▲	140.44% ▲
Guanacaste	Santa Cruz	10,390	5,948	4,442 ▲	74.68% ▲
Guanacaste	Bagaces	1,890	1,476	414 ▲	28.05% ▲
Guanacaste	Carrillo	5,364	-	-	-
Guanacaste	Cañas	3,500	2,165	1,335 ▲	61.66% ▲
Guanacaste	Abangares	5,540	-	-	-
Guanacaste	Tilarán	6,131	-	-	-
Puntarenas	Puntarenas	14,746	8,869	5,877 ▲	66.26% ▲
Puntarenas	Esparza	5,314	3,298	2,016 ▲	61.13% ▲
Puntarenas	Montes de Oro	4,312	-	-	-
Puntarenas	Osa	4,367	-	-	-
Limón	Limón	22,424	7,484	14,940 ▲	199.63% ▲
Limón	Pococí	2,974	-	-	-
Limón	Siquirres	6,880	-	-	-
