= Centro de Conservación de Santa Ana =

Zoo in Costa Rica

- Centro de Conservación de Santa Ana
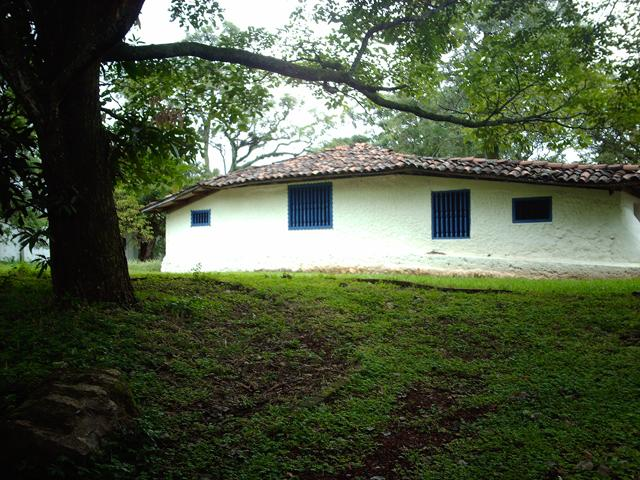
- Interactive map of Centro de Conservación de Santa Ana
- Type: Urban park. Zoo, Botanical Garden. Museum
- Location: Uruca, Santa Ana. Costa Rica
- Coordinates: 9°56′12″N 84°11′34″W
- Area: 560,000 square metres (140 acres)
- Created: 1976
- Closed: 11th May 2024
- Status: Closed Permanently

Centro de Conservación de Santa Ana (Santa Ana Conservation Center, CCSA) was a wilderness area and zoo, of approximately 52 hectares (130 acres), located in the Uruca district, in the canton of Santa Ana, Costa Rica. It had an average altitude of 900 meters and was bounded to the east by the bed of the river Uruca. The site included patches of one of the last remnants of dry tropical forest in the Central Valley, trails, Agricultural Historical Museum, a soccer field, picnic area, a species of wild and domestic animals and a nursery of forest species.

Administered by a conservation nonprofit foundation called Fundación Pro Zoológicos (Fundazoo) since 1994, which also ran the Simón Bolivar National Zoo, and Botanic Garden, until the expiration of their contract on the 10th of may 2024, it was officially closed on the 11th of May of 2024.

== History ==
The mill and much of the land comprising the Center comes from a family legacy of the family of Robert Ross Lang, an immigrant from English origin. In 1869, Ross acquired the property to install a sugar cane mill. It is known that the mill already existed at that time, so Ross took advantage of the facilities to sell the product to the National Liquor Factory. Over time, the property became the Hacienda Ross.

Mister Ross died in 1907, and his son Alexander Ross Davidson took charge of the Treasury. The new owner planted rice, coffee and sugar cane, and joined the benefit was at its periphery with the sugar mill, which later became a little ingenuity. In 1918 Alex was one of the largest producers of sugar in the country, and then came to export coffee harvest 1932–1933. In 1954 he took his last task of sweet and died the following year, leaving the Hacienda divided among his three sons.

One of them, Lorne Ross Ashley, was left with a part of the farm which was later known as Finca Lornessa. Mister Lorne and his wife continued to agricultural vocation, so they kept cattle, producing eggs, cultivated plots of maize, beans, vegetables and fruit trees.

The CCSA was partly donated by Mr. Lorne Ross the Costa Rican government in 1975 to build the National Zoo and the rest of the property was acquired for the same purpose in 1976. In 1993 the mission of this institution defined as conservation of national, historical and natural heritage.

In 1976, the Lornessa estate was divided into several parts, some of them were bought by the state, and another was donated by Ross spouses in order to preserve the natural and cultural heritage of the place. The desire of the couple to preserve and disseminate this heritage is being fulfilled thanks to the actions of Fundazoo, body site administrator.

In the following decades, various species of flora and fauna originating from various parts of the country, in order to promote the concept of conservation of tropical habitat were introduced.

Because of its major expansion and pleasant climate, for many years appeared attempts to build on its premises a zoo, but none materialised until in 1994 the property was to be administered by the Fundación Pro Zoológicos.

Since the beginning of the century, the CCSA through Fundazoo devoted part of its activity to research, captive breeding of species of tropical flora and fauna, environmental education, conservation and rehabilitation of habitat and recreation ecotourism.

== Attractions ==
Conservation Center of Santa Ana had an area of approximately 140 acres. It was divided into patches of forest regeneration, nature trails and Aramides Uruca, the Historical Agricultural Museum, a germinating, two forest nurseries, a circuit wild animal enclosures, a garden of cactus and succulents; the prompt opening of a butterfly and a garden of palm projects.

Its most valuable infrastructure was the house of adobe, masonry, sugar cane and tiled roof, declared National Historical Heritage, which is over 250 years old, consisted of a main room, a bedroom, an area of cupboards and batteries, a kitchen and a chapel that served as the first church of Santa Ana in 1850.

Beside the Historical Agricultural Museum, which consisted of an old mill with crops and domestic animals typical of the Central Valley is located. Near the ruins of a tarball benefit of coffee are.

== See also ==
- Rescate Wildlife Rescue Center
- Grecia (toucan)
