= Uruca District =

Uruca District may refer to:

- Uruca District, San José, in San José Canton, San José Province, Costa Rica
- Uruca District, Santa Ana, in Santa Ana Canton, San José Province, Costa Rica
