= Santa Ana, Costa Rica =

District in Santa Ana canton, San José province, Costa Rica

Santa Ana
- District
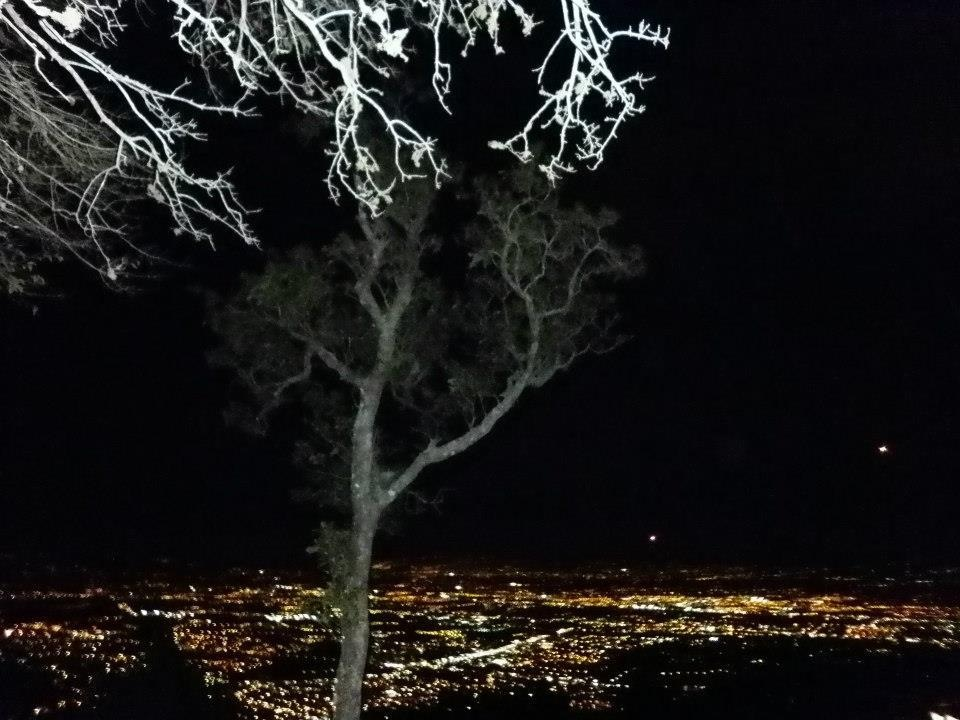
- Nighttime view of Santa Ana, Costa Rica
- Santa Ana district
- Santa Ana district location in Costa Rica
- Coordinates: 9.9319879°N 84.1759787°W
- Country: Costa Rica
- Province: San José
- Canton: Santa Ana

Area
  - Total: 5.4 km^{2} (2.1 sq mi)
- Elevation: 904 m (2,966 ft)

Population (2011)
  - Total: 11,320
  - Density: 2,100/km^{2} (5,400/sq mi)
- Time zone: UTC−06:00
- Postal code: 10901

Santa Ana is a district and head city of the Santa Ana canton, in the San José province of Costa Rica. The city acts as seat to the municipal government of the Santa Ana Canton.

== Geography ==
Santa Ana has an area of 5.4 km^{2} and an elevation of 904 metres.

== Demographics ==
Historical population
Census	Pop.	±% p.a.
1864	1,068	—
1883	2,114	+3.66%
1892	1,460	−4.03%
1927	962	−1.18%
1950	1,630	+2.32%
1963	3,137	+5.17%
1973	5,315	+5.41%
1984	6,200	+1.41%
2000	8,517	+2.00%
2011	11,320	+2.62%
2022	13,186	+1.40%
Source: Instituto Nacional de Estadística y Censos; Centro Centroamericano de Población

For the 2011 census, Santa Ana had a population of 11,320 inhabitants.

The population accounts for approximately 20% of the canton's population. It is currently the second most populous district in the Santa Ana Canton after the district of Pozos.

Male: 5,563 Female: 6,212

Male to Female Ratio: 1:1.12

== Economy ==
The city of Santa Ana still maintains its traditional feel of a typical Costa Rican town with its small stores, bars, and restaurants which offer both local and international cuisine as well as Sunday fresh fruit and vegetable markets. Nonetheless, Santa Ana has been recently experiencing real estate and unprecedented commercial development in the entire Central Valley. The city has grocery stores, restaurants, banks, gas stations, medical and dental clinics, beauty salons, coffee houses, hotels, private schools, and small commercial centers. The city itself is within a few minutes of the surging business locale of Lindora, in the Pozos district, adding to the availability of commercial, lodging and residential areas.

== Transportation ==
National routes in the district or nearby include:

- National Route 27: Connecting San José and Caldera, Puntarenas, passes within a mile of the city of Santa Ana. This has recently allowed faster travel to the Pacific coast, an average of 45 minutes from Santa Ana. The capital city of San Jose is also within 15–20 minutes thanks to this route. Although no distinction is legally made between freeways and tollways, Route 27 qualifies as the latter. The first two ramps (underpasses) in the San Jose-Caldera (West) direction service the Santa Ana district, the second being Route 147. These ramps have no exit tolls.
- National Route 121: Runs through the Santa Ana district overlapping most of 5th St and 3rd Ave. It connects the county with neighboring Escazu (East) and Mora (West). It is considered the main alternative to Route 27. Nevertheless, it does not have the same vehicle capacity due to its single-lane and curving layout.
- National Route 147: Connects the Santa Ana district with the neighboring cantons of San Rafael, Alajuela and Belen, Heredia. However, due to the growing enterprises and commercial sector in Lindora, Route 147 faces daily congestion.
- National Route 310: Begins in the Santa Ana district and continues through Pozos northwards, parallel to Route 147. It runs through Route 27 without any official ramps connecting them. Since Route 310 runs through Pozos, connecting to Escazu, it is still an alternate route to Route 27. It is not recommended unless the previous routes are heavily congested. Route 310 ends in Route 121 in the Escazu canton after once more passing through Route 27 (with connecting ramps) due to its southwards facing U-shape.
- National Route 311: Connects the district with the Salitral district to the south. The route ends in the town of Salitral.

=== Public transportation ===
Bus routes in Santa Ana are yet to be officially named and numbered. Buses serving the Santa Ana-Escazu-San Jose routes are currently identified by their blue color scheme. The route is currently managed by CILT. Buses serving the Santa Ana-Belen route follow a predominantly white with violet stripes scheme. The route each bus takes is indicated on the windshield without following any defined standards; passengers may ask the bus driver for clarification if needed. Fees for each route are set by the national authority- they cannot be modified and must be indicated and paid upon entry. There are discount plans available for 'Golden Citizens' (elderly residents) upon request at the local government offices exclusive to the Santa Ana-Escazu-San Jose bus services.

Santa Ana's authorized taxi service is officially located on Main St (Calle Central), in front of the church as well as further north (between Central & 5th Ave). Official taxi services follow the national standards: Red-colored with yellow triangles on the side indicating their permit number; licence plates begin with TSJ (Taxi San Jose). Taxi services with official plates from other provinces (TH, TP, etc.) are not permitted to begin their service in San Jose and vice versa. They can, nonetheless, begin their service within their permitted province and finish it elsewhere. Since Santa Ana is located in the Province of San Jose, said limitations apply to non-TSJ plate wielders except Airport Shuttles and Taxis which operate freely in all provinces but are only available if called or at the airport.

== Culture and education ==
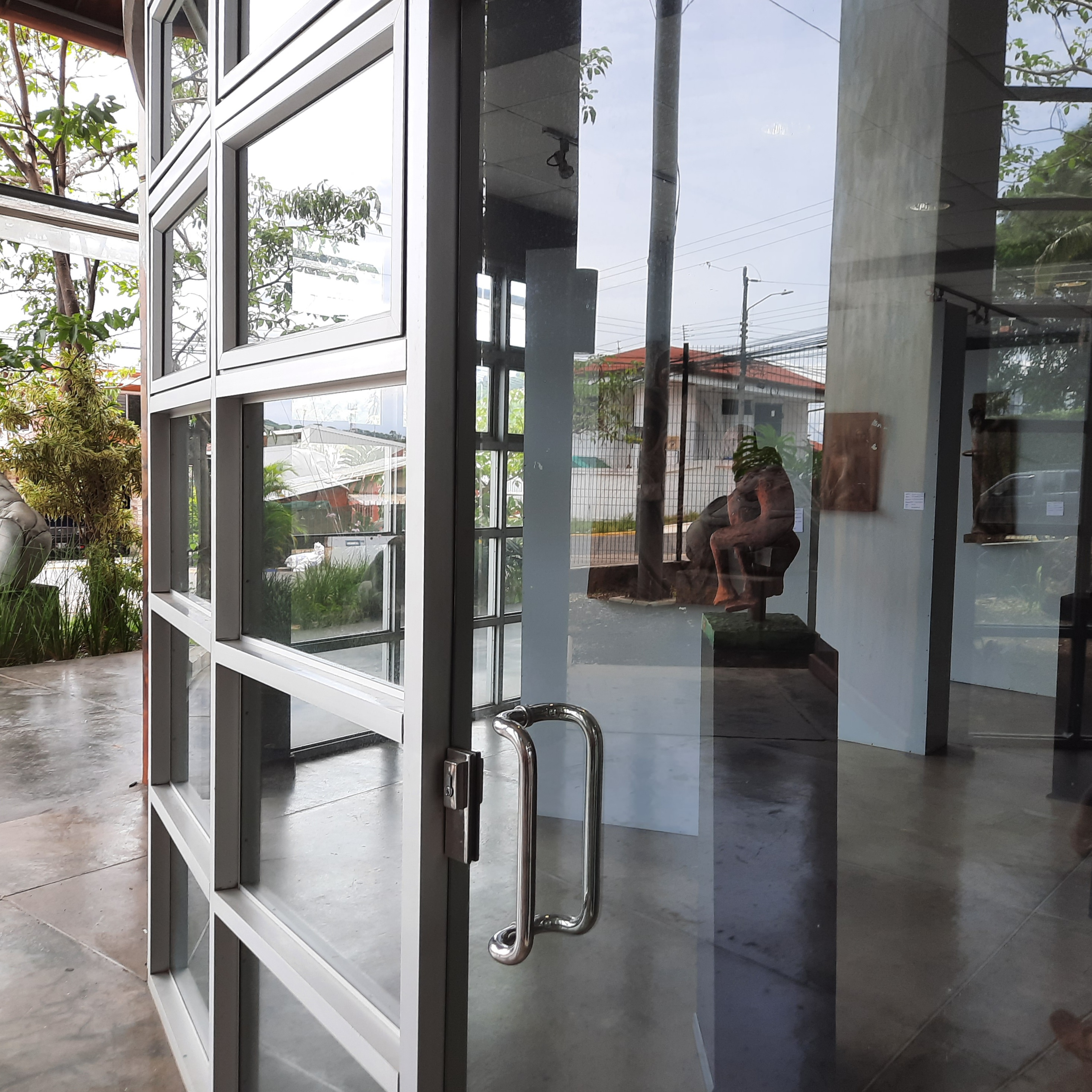
Entrance to the art gallery of the Escuela Municipal de Artes Integradas, Santa Ana, Costa Rica

The Santa Ana district's public education is served by the Andres Bello primary (elementary) school. The secondary education cycle (middle & high school) is offered by the Liceo de Santa Ana located in the neighboring district of Uruca.

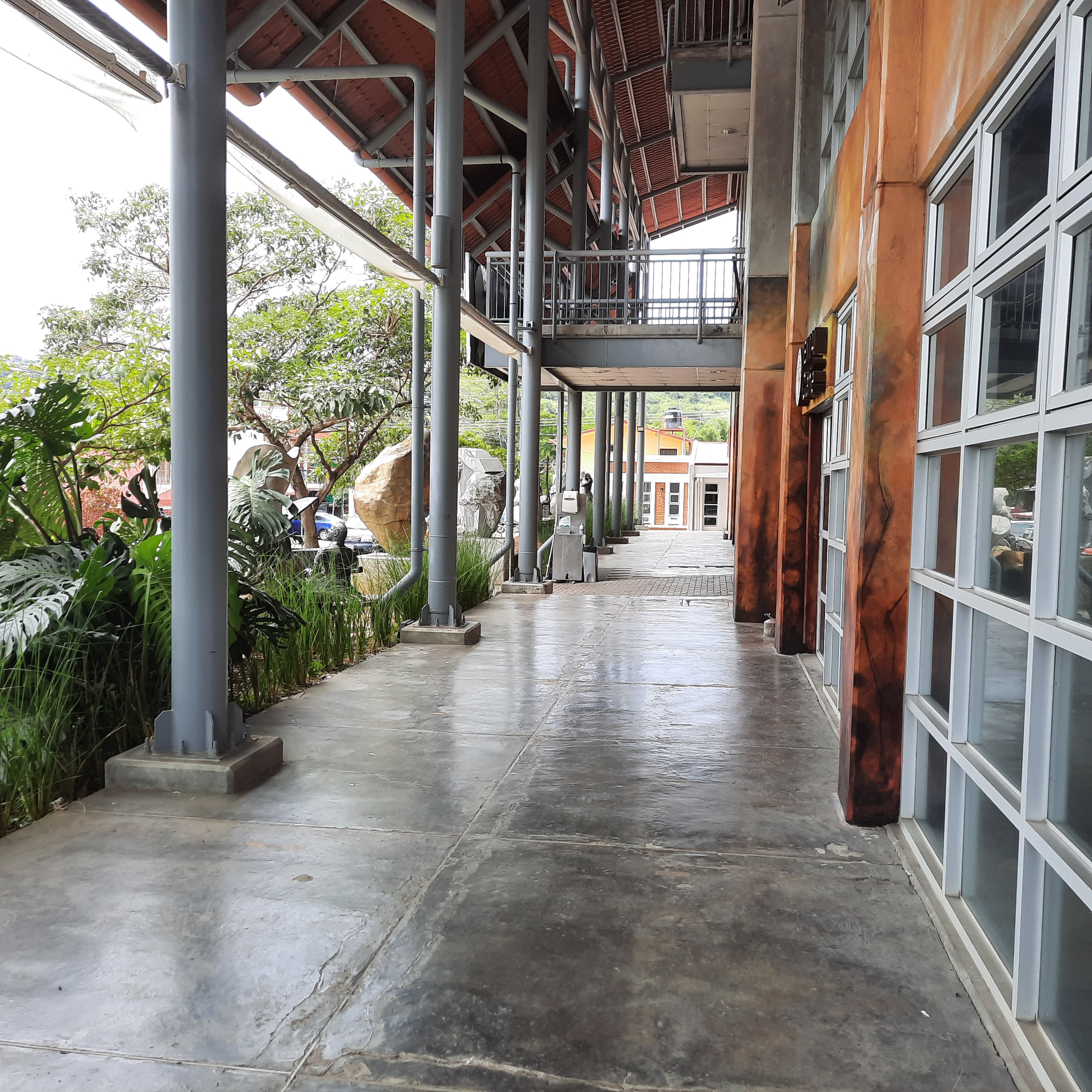
Entrance area to the Escuela Municipal de Artes Integradas

Santa Ana hosts the United World College of Costa Rica which offers the IB program for international students.

The new Municipal Building of Culture houses the Municipal School of Integrated Arts or Escuela Municipal de Artes Integradas (locally known as the EMAI for its Spanish acronym), which excels in its music program. It also features an art gallery, an auditorium, multipurpose rooms, municipal office spaces and a variety of murals adorning its contemporary facade.

== Sports ==
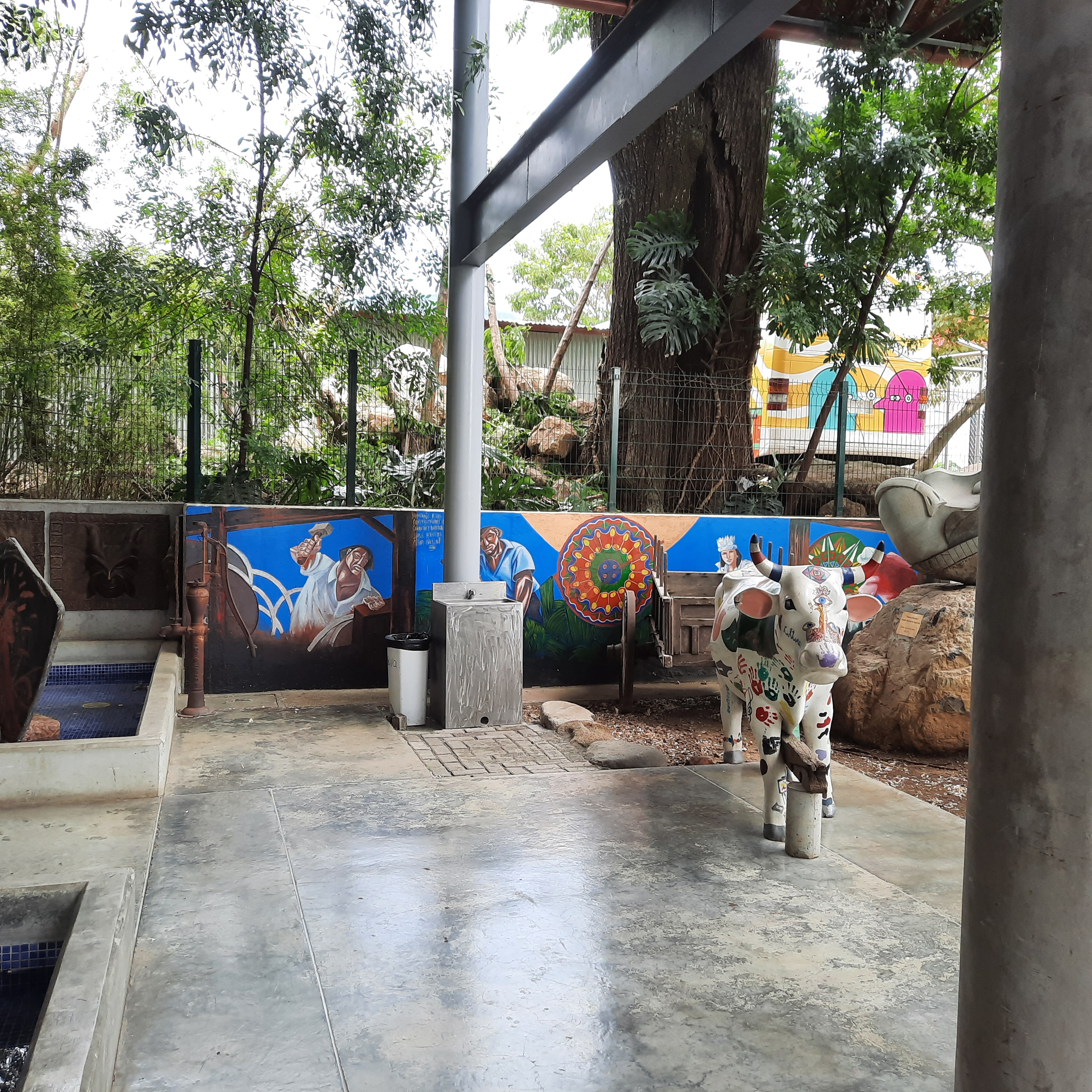
Patio near the art gallery for the Escuela Municipal de Artes Integradas

Golfers in Santa Ana have access to the Parque Valle del Sol golf course located in Lindora, Santa Ana. It is the first and the only professional golf course in Costa Rica open to the public in the Central Valley. The 18-hole championship golf course was designed by Tracy May in 1994 to be challenging and fair under most conditions and downright tough when the strong winds come down from the surrounding mountains. Due to its diverse layout, golfers are required to use all of the clubs in their bag throughout the game.

The Santa Ana district has two municipal soccer fields and a municipal gymnasium. Public courts used mostly for basketball are adjacent to the main soccer field which faces the church. The current state of the roads and sidewalks make urban cycling and jogging slightly more risky than in other communities. There is an ongoing effort from the local government authorities to increase parks & recreation, an undeveloped aspect of Santa Ana's urban landscape.

Santa Ana's is home to premier Mixed Martial Arts and Personal Training studios like MMA Costa Rica and Fight & Fitness.
