= Party of the Sun =

Party of the Sun can refer to:

- Party of the Sun (Costa Rica)
- Party of the Sun (Uruguay)
- People's Party (Puerto Rico)
