= National Route 147 (Costa Rica) =

National Road Route in Costa Rica

National Secondary Route 147
- Ruta nacional secundaria 147

Route information
- Maintained by Ministry of Public Works and Transport
- Length: 5.180 km (3.219 mi)

Major junctions
- North end: Route 122
- Route 27
- East end: Route 121

Location
- Country: Costa Rica
- Provinces: San José, Alajuela

Highway system
- National Road Network of Costa Rica
← Route 146	→ Route 148

National Secondary Route 147, or just Route 147 (Spanish: Ruta Nacional Secundaria 147, or Ruta 147) is a National Road Route of Costa Rica located in the San José and Alajuela provinces. It is locally known as either Radial San Antonio or Radial Santa Ana.

== Description ==
A straight forward radial road, it spans the San Rafael district in Alajuela canton of Alajuela province, and Pozos, Santa Ana districts of Santa Ana canton, in San José province. In Pozos district there is a junction with Route 27.

== History ==
The bridge over Virilla river was widened in 2018, further lane widening is withhold due to expropriation process.
