= Brasil District =

District in Santa Ana canton, San José province, Costa Rica

Brasil
- District
- Interactive map of Brasil
- Brasil district location in Costa Rica
- Coordinates: 9.9380022°N 84.2305868°W
- Country: Costa Rica
- Province: San José
- Canton: Santa Ana

Area
  - Total: 3.25 km^{2} (1.25 sq mi)
- Elevation: 878 m (2,881 ft)

Population (2011)
  - Total: 2,586
  - Density: 796/km^{2} (2,060/sq mi)
- Time zone: UTC−06:00
- Postal code: 10906

Brasil is a district of the Santa Ana canton, in the San José province of Costa Rica.

== Geography ==
Brasil has an area of 3.25 km^{2} and an elevation of 878 metres.

== Demographics ==
Historical population
Census	Pop.	±% p.a.
1927	183	—
1950	203	+0.45%
1963	362	+4.55%
1973	553	+4.33%
1984	917	+4.71%
2000	1,762	+4.17%
2011	2,586	+3.55%
2022	3,876	+3.75%
Source: Instituto Nacional de Estadística y Censos; Centro Centroamericano de Población

For the 2011 census, Brasil had a population of 2,586 inhabitants.

== Transportation ==
=== Road transportation ===
The district is covered by the following road routes:

- National Route 22
- National Route 27
- National Route 121
