= Hacienda Vieja =

District in Orotina canton, Alajuela province, Costa Rica

- District
- Interactive map of Hacienda Vieja
- Hacienda Vieja district location in Costa Rica
- Coordinates: 9.9238467°N 84.4890563°W
- Country: Costa Rica
- Province: Alajuela
- Canton: Orotina

Area
  - Total: 16.93 km^{2} (6.54 sq mi)
- Elevation: 270 m (890 ft)

Population (2011)
  - Total: 1,022
  - Density: 60.37/km^{2} (156.3/sq mi)
- Time zone: UTC−06:00
- Postal code: 20903

Hacienda Vieja is a district of the Orotina canton, in the Alajuela province of Costa Rica.

== Geography ==
Hacienda Vieja has an area of 16.93 km^{2} and an elevation of 270 metres.

== Demographics ==
Historical population
Census	Pop.	±% p.a.
1927	485	—
1950	742	+1.87%
1963	774	+0.33%
1973	766	−0.10%
1984	728	−0.46%
2000	890	+1.26%
2011	1,022	+1.27%
2022	1,169	+1.23%
Source: Instituto Nacional de Estadística y Censos; Centro Centroamericano de Población

For the 2011 census, Hacienda Vieja had a population of 1,022 inhabitants.

== Transportation ==
=== Road transportation ===
The district is covered by the following road routes:

- National Route 27
