= Santa Ana (canton) =

Canton in San José province, Costa Rica

Santa Ana Cantón de Santa Ana (Spanish)
- Canton
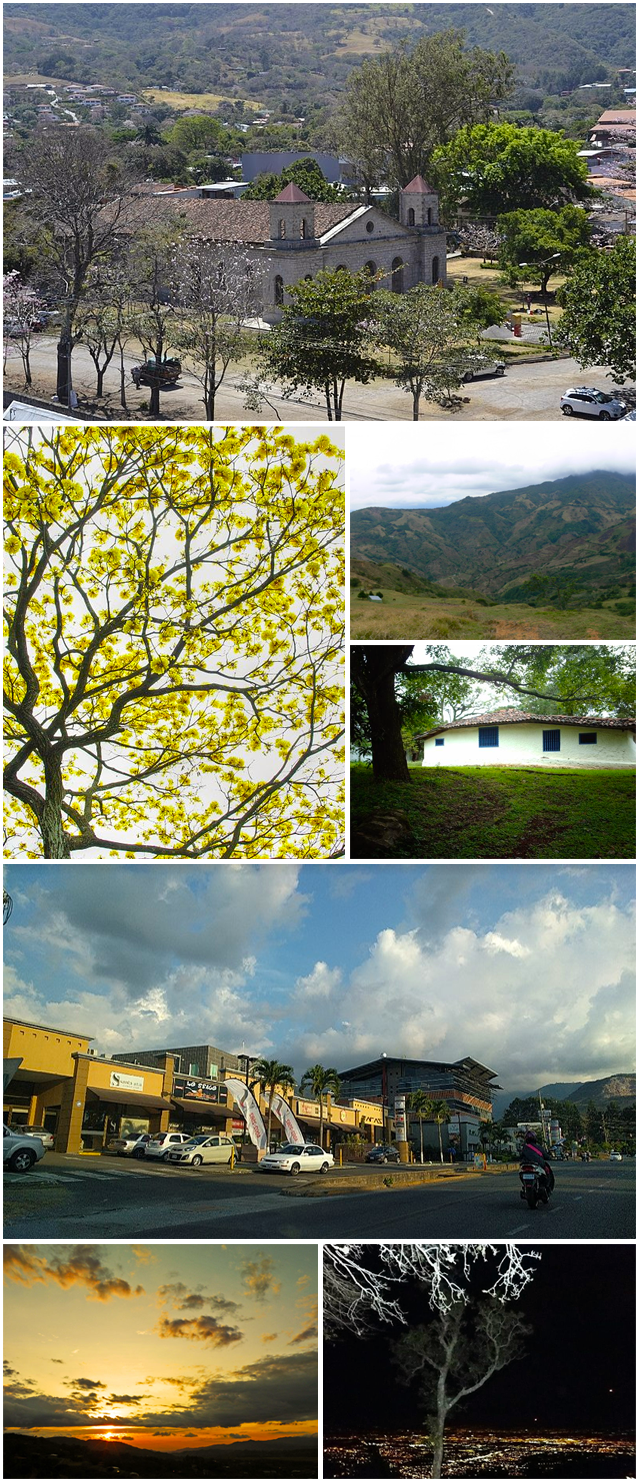
- From the top, left to right: The Saint Anne parish church, a Roble Sabana, the Escazú mountains as seen from the Salitral district, the Santa Ana Conservation Centre, a shopping centre, a view of the sunset in the Piedades district, a view of Santa Ana at night.

- Flag Coat of arms
- Nicknames: Valle del Sol; Spanish for: "Valley of the Sun"
- Santa Ana canton
- Santa Ana canton location in San José Province Santa Ana canton location in Costa Rica
- Coordinates: 9.9184253°N 84.1957531°W
- Country: Costa Rica
- Province: San José
- Creation: August 29, 1907
- Head city: Santa Ana
- Districts: Districts: Santa Ana; Salitral; Pozos; Uruca; Piedades; Brasil

Government
  - Type: Municipality
  - Body: Municipalidad de Santa Ana
  - Mayor: Juan José Vargas Fallas (PUSC)

Area
  - Total: 61.42 km^{2} (23.71 sq mi)
- Elevation: 904 m (2,966 ft)

Population (2011)
  - Total: 49,123
  - Estimate (2022): 58,020
  - Density: 799.8/km^{2} (2,071/sq mi)
- Demonym(s): Santaneño, -a
- Time zone: UTC−06:00
- Canton code: 109
- Website: www.santaana.go.cr

Santa Ana (Spanish: Cantón de Santa Ana) is the ninth canton in the San José province of Costa Rica. It is located in the Central Valley. It borders with the Alajuela canton to the north, the Mora canton to the south and west, the Escazú canton to the east, as well as the Belén canton to the north east. As of 2022, the canton has the highest Human Development Index of any region in Costa Rica with a score of 0.871.

== Toponymy ==
The first mention of the name Santa Ana is within a letter in the Protocols of Cartago dated December 1, 1658, when a piece of a site named Santa Ana becomes the property of José de Alvarado and Petronilla de Retes after their marriage. The name is theorized to come from Jeronimo de Retes (Petronilla's father and the high sheriff of Cartago), a previous owner of the lands (which were given to him by the Spanish crown as recognition for his work); being named after Saint Anne.

Within the letter, the name of the site is spelled as "Santana". This spelling, alongside the modern two worded spelling (Santa Ana), are used interchargibly in some documents, and are used as such as late as the 1864 Costa Rican census. By the time of the canton's creation in 1907 however, the two worded spelling is the only one utilized.

== History ==
=== Pre-Columbian History ===
In the archeological site of La Cubilla (in Pozos), four rooms dating from between 300 BC to 300 AD are found, which are believed to have been occupied intermittently at three different points in time. Sections of these floors are believed to have been made of clay. The outside of the site was also likely used for mortuary purposes. A monochromatic vase, as well as various incomplete tiestos (Note: Spanish for a shard or piece of a vase, within context however, likely referring to pieces of any given artifact.) were also found either in the surrounding area of or within the site. A total of 11 archaeological sites can be found in the canton.

At the time of the Spanish's arrival in the 16th century, the land that now conforms the canton was part of the Reino Huetar de Occidente, one of two kingdoms ruled by the cacique Garabito (rey).

=== Colonization and Early History ===
In 1559, upon receiving a royal license from Philip II of Spain, the governor of Nicaragua, Juan de Cavallón y Arboleda, planned an effort to colonize the Costa Rican Caribbean coast. Although this effort failed, in January 1561, alongside an expedition formed by 80 Spaniards, slaves and a large amount of livestock, Cavallón entered the region from Nicaragua, in another effort to settle and pacify the region. The expedition would pass by Chomes, near the modern-day location of Puntarenas, before marching further inland. There, Cavallón would send out various hunting parties, one of which captured an indigenous Chorotega chief called Coyote. Subsequently, Coyote's subjects agreed to guide Cavallón further inland. There, it is believed that Cavallón founded the settlement of Castillo de Garcimuñoz, which was named after his birthplace. It is believed to have been the first permanent Spanish colony in the region and the Central Valley. The exact location of the colony has been debated however, with some theories suggesting the location was either by the Ciruelas River, in modern day Turrúcares, or near modern day Desamparados instead of the Santa Ana Valley.

Cavallón struggled to overcome resistance from local Huetar groups, and when the settlement had ran out of provisions, an operation from Antonio Perrya was sent to forcibly submit and raid the area of Old Tabarcia.. In 1562 however, Cavallón would leave the settlement, having failed at his attested mission. He was replaced by Juan Vázquez de Coronado. By 1563, the settlement was mostly abandoned, with the inhabitants eventually moving to the colony of Cartago by 1564, having been established by Coronado the previous year. This was possibly done due to the lack of slave labour.

The canton was further colonized in the 16th or 17th century, (Note: Sources conflict on the century the lands were ceded in. An Ifam article states that the ceding occurred in the 16th century, however a later TicoTimes article states that the ceding occurred a century later.) following the ceding of the land by the Spanish crown to Jerónimo de Retes y López de Ortega, the high sheriff of Cartago. These lands were ceded as recognition for his work. Following Jerónimo's daughter (Petronila de Retes)’s marriage to José de Alvarado, part of the lands were ceded into the couple's possession in a letter in the Protocols of Cartago dated on December 1, 1658. This letter also marks the first mention of the name Santa Ana, as a name for the lands. Soon afterwards however, the lands would pass down to Ana de Retes, Petronilla's sister. Ana would later sell the lands in which the modern head city of Santa Ana is located in.

The Retes family would later sell part of the lands in 1750 to a priest named Juan de Pomar y Burgos. Around the year 1765, Pomar would build a house, (now known as "La Casona") as-well as a chapel. By 1817, most of the land had come into possession of Ana María de Cárdenas. However, by 1850, the lands had changed hands multiple times, eventually ending up in the hands of a priest named Ana Tiburcio Fernández Valverde. Valverde would subsequently remodel the old chapel, converting it into a small hermitage, which would open in 1850. Around this time, the modern day head city of the canton (Santa Ana) began to arise around the Fernández property, along the Uruca river. In March 1870, the current parish church of Santa Ana began construction, with it being completed in 1880. The centre of the future district moved east around this time to the location of the new parish church.

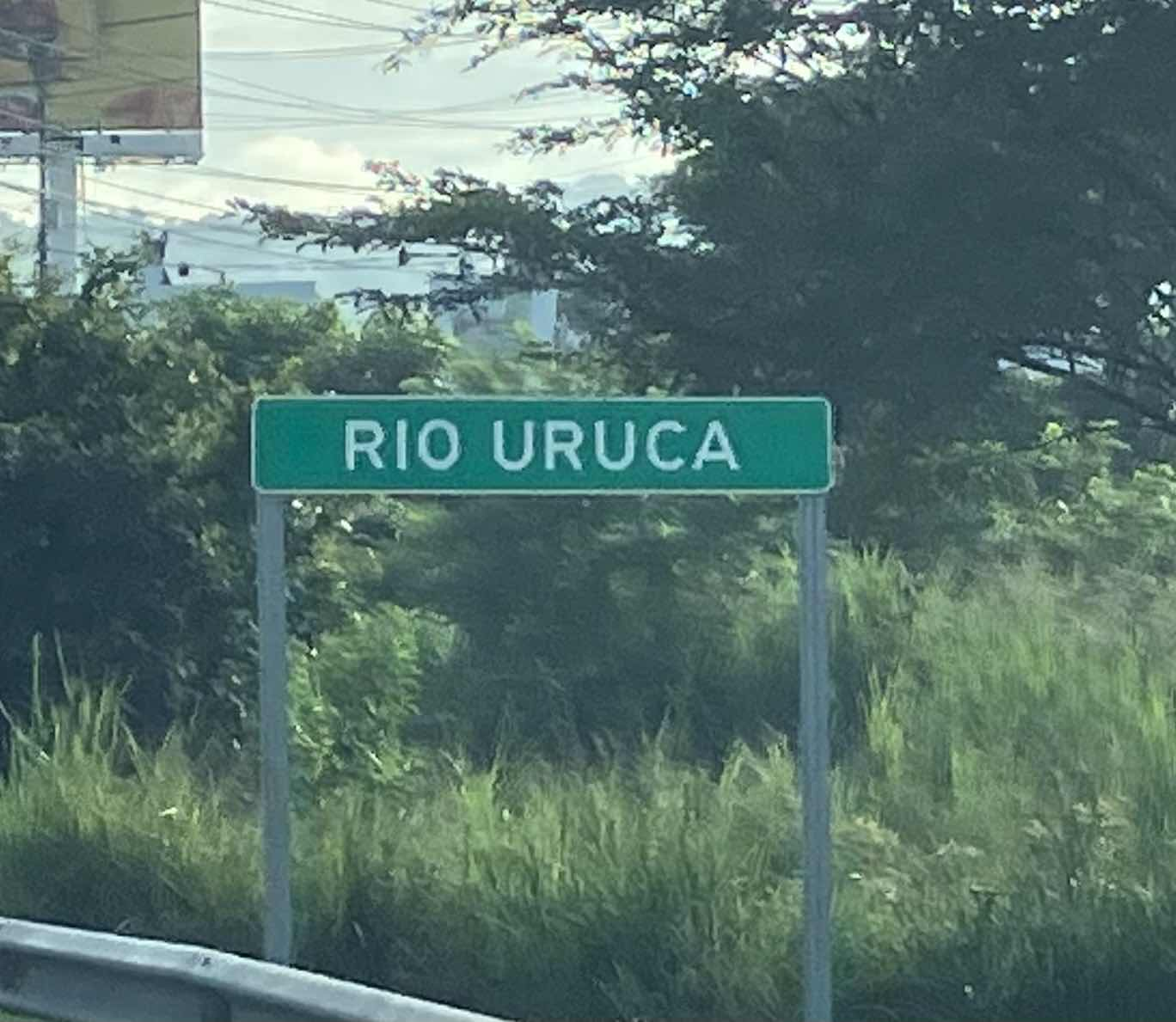
Road sign for the Uruca River, seen off National Route 27

In the 1864 Costa Rican census, the region of Santa Ana (Note: Within the census, referred to as either Santa Ana or Santana, depending on the section.), at the time a part of the Escazú canton (Note: Within the census, the canton is referred to as Escasú.), is recorded as having a population of 1,068. 6 years later in 1870, the government of Tomás Guardia Gutiérrez creates the Santa Ana mayorship, and names Cerlindo Villareal as its first mayor. In 1890, a piece of former Fernández property, known as "Hacienda Ross" (named after its original owner, Englishman Robert Ross Lang), is believed to have become the first ever Costa Rican settlement for railway workers, due to the good relationship between the railroad builder, Minor Kieth, and the Ross family.

By December 1902, the town of Santa Ana had surpassed the town of Escazú in population.

After the construction of a road between San José and Puriscal, which passed through the city of Santa Ana, the citizens of the city put forth a request to the current rector of the Municipality of Escazú for Santa Ana, Victor Castro Orozco, to make known to the council their wishes for independence. Castro honours the request and puts forward an official motion to the municipality, which is supported by the rest of the municipalities rectors. The matter then, is presented to the Constitutional Congress, with support from then president González Víquez. The motion was approved after two debates. Not withstanding, the Municipal Government of Escazú objects that the limits between Escazú and Santa Ana aren't clearly demarcated. As such Congress asks the Executive branch to decide the matter of the border.

=== Independence From Escazú and Modern History ===
Map detailing Octavio Quesada's proposal for the borders of the Santa Ana Cantón (1908)

On August 29, 1907, under Decree no.8, Santa Ana was awarded the title of canton, becoming fully independent from Escazú. The first session of the new council was held on September 15 that same year.

As part of decree no.8, the executive power is authorized to determine the limits of both the Canton and its districts. As part of this, in October 1907, Octavio Quesada is put in charge of the matter. Quesada presents a report the following year, within which is included a proposal for the potential limits of the canton of Santa Ana. The proposal isn't recognized by the Municipality of Escazú, who protested to the President. By 1914, both Municipalities of Santa Ana and Escazú agree to discuss the matter once more. Both Municipalities meet on the 15 of January 1915, however the border isn't conclusively agreed upon until 1927.

In 1908, a contract was signed to build Costa Rica's second hydroelectric plant in the Brasil District of the canton, with it being finished it 1912. Electric streetlights would arrive the following year. Around 1915, it is believed that onions were introduced to the canton, they would quickly become Santa Ana's most famous crop, with Santa Ana citizens being given the nickname of "Cebolleros" (onion farmers). Santa Ana holds an Onion fair even in modern times. Following the military coup of Federico Tinoco Granados in 1917, the city of Santa Ana would become a mayor stronghold for rebellion against the government. Among the leaders of this rebellion was Jorge Volio Jiménez, a priest who was later honoured with a head bust outside of the Municipal Building of Santa Ana. Tinico's rule would only last 2 years, with him being deposed in 1919. Costa Rica's first international airport would open in the canton, in the barrio of Lindora, in 1931, with the town soon being modernised into an international gateway for the country around 1934. The country's main airport would be moved to La Sabana in 1940.

During the 1948 Costa Rican Civil War, the canton would be home to Marcial Aguiluz Orellana, a leading figure in the National Liberation Army during the civil war. He would later help defeat a counter-revolutionary movement by Rafael Angel Calderón Guardia in 1955, and would eventually join the Legislative Assembly of Costa Rica. He would die in the canton in 1986. The first automatic telephone would arrive in the canton in 1966. On May 4, 1970, Santa Ana was officially declared a city under the municipal code, and would become the seat for the Santa Ana canton.

In 1971, the name of "Valley of the Sun" would be adopted by the municipality after being used as a traditional nickname for the canton for years. On March 23 that same year, a group of the canton's citizens gathered in the Andrés Bello López school to discuss the creation of a college to serve the area. Following a 6-month funding campaign, the Colegio de Santa Ana (Santa Ana College) is founded in September 1971, with it beginning its activities in 1972. Following his appointment as coordinator to the Cultural Affairs Commission of the canton's municipal council, Dr. Jorge Luis Acevedo Vargas began an investigation into the canton's cultural potential. Following his investigation's publishing as a book, and support from the canton's Municipal Council, Dr. Acevedo's proposal of an art school and art gallery to support the region was approved in 1998. The Municipal School of Integrated Arts and gallery were both created that same year. They are located in the canton's head city of Santa Ana.

== Government ==
=== Mayor ===
According to Costa Rica's Municipal Code, mayors are elected every four years by the population of the canton. As of the latest municipal elections in 2024, the Social Christian Unity Party candidate, Juan José Vargas Fallas, was elected mayor of the canton with 26.79% of the votes, with María de los Ángeles Sibaja (Note: Also legally named Marielos Rivera Sibaja.) and Alexander Hernández Hernández as first and second vice mayors, respectively.

Mayors of Santa Ana since the 2002 elections
| Period | Name | Party |
|---|---|---|
| 2002–2006 | Ronald Octavio Traña Calvo | PUSC |
| 2006–2010 | Gerardo Oviedo Espinoza | PLN |
| 2010–2016 | Gerardo Oviedo Espinoza | PLN |
| 2016–2020 | Gerardo Oviedo Espinoza | PLN |
| 2020–2024 | Gerardo Oviedo Espinoza | PLN |
| 2024–2028 | Juan José Vargas Fallas | PUSC |

=== Municipal Council ===
Like the mayor and vice mayors, members of the Municipal Council (called regidores) are elected every four years. Santa Ana's Municipal Council has 7 seats for regidores and their substitutes, who can participate in meetings but not vote unless the owning regidor (regidor propietario) is absent. The current president of the Municipal Council is the Party of the Sun regidora, María Paula Villarreal Galera, with the Social Christian Unity Party member, Gonzalo Rojas Rojas, as vice president. The Municipal Council's composition for the 2024–2028 period is as follows:

Current composition of the Municipal Council of Santa Ana after the 2024 municipal elections
Political parties in the Municipal Council of Santa Ana
| Political party | Regidores | | |
| Political party | № | Owner | Substitute |
|---|---|---|---|
| Party of the Sun (PDS) | 2 | Marco Aurelio Odio Aguilar | Esteban Blanco Herrera |
| Party of the Sun (PDS) | 2 | María Paula Villarreal Galera^{(P)} | Debbie Mayela Zamora Leitón |
| Social Christian Unity Party (PUSC) | 2 | Cynthia Jorleny Chaves Robles | Sofía Álvarez Kim |
| Social Christian Unity Party (PUSC) | 2 | Gonzalo Rojas Rojas^{(VP)} | Ricardo Enrique Alfaro Zamora |
| National Liberation Party (PLN) | 2 | Walter Alberto Herrera Cantillo (Note: Also legally named Walther Alb Herrera Cantillo) | José Roberto Castro Araya |
| National Liberation Party (PLN) | 2 | Milena Blen Alvarado | Marcela María Sibaja Cabrera |
| Social Christian Republican Party (PRSC) | 1 | Danny Ricardo Ureña Marín | Emmanuel Morales Mora |

== Geography ==
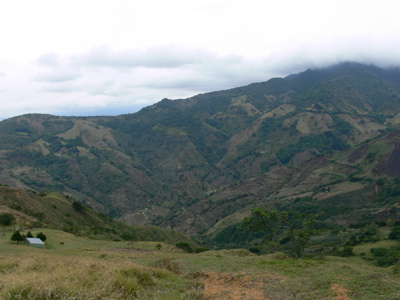
The Cerros de Escazú in the Salitral District

Some of the settlements within the canton (such as the head city of Santa Ana, Rio Oro or Pozos) are located within a small valley formed between the Cerros de Escazu in the south and the Río Virilla. The canton also includes parts of the Cerros de Escazu and its foothills, where towns such as Matinilla are located.

The canton's boundaries are roughly defined as follows: Its northern border follows the aformentioned Virilla River. Its eastern border follows between Puente Mulas (located across the Virilla River) and the Cerros de Escazu, crossing through various hills including Cerro Palomas and Alto Granadilla. The canton's southern border is the Cerros de Escazu themselves, crossing near Cerro Cedral and through Cerro Tacuotari. Finally, its western border with the Mora Canton goes between the confluence of the Rio Virilla and Quebrada Muerte and the Cerros de Escazu, crossing through Cerro Pacacua and Cerro Caña Quemada.

The canton has an area of 61.42 km^{2} (23.71 sq mi) and a mean elevation of 904 m (2,966 ft).

== Districts ==
The canton of Santa Ana is subdivided into the following districts:

Districts of the Santa Ana Canton
| # | District | Area (km^{2}) | Elevation | Population (2022) |
|---|---|---|---|---|
| 1 | Santa Ana | 5.44 | 904 m | 13,186 |
| 2 | Salitral | 20.29 | 1022 m. | 4,626 |
| 3 | Pozos | 13.35 | 847 m. | 17,516 |
| 4 | Uruca | 7.03 | 873 m. | 9,423 |
| 5 | Piedades | 12.07 | 899 m | 9,393 |
| 6 | Brasil | 3.24 | 878 m | 3,876 |

== Demographics ==
Historical population
| Census | Pop. | ±% p.a. |
|---|---|---|
| 1927 | 3,785 | — |
| 1950 | 5,812 | +1.88% |
| 1963 | 9,026 | +3.44% |
| 1973 | 14,499 | +4.85% |
| 1984 | 19,605 | +2.78% |
| 2000 | 34,507 | +3.60% |
| 2011 | 49,123 | +3.26% |
| 2022 | 58,020 | +1.52% |
Source: Instituto Nacional de Estadística y Censos; Centro Centroamericano de Población

Santa Ana had an estimated population of 58,020 people in 2022, an increase from the 49,123 recorded at the time of the 2011 census.

In 2022, the canton would obtain the highest Human Development Index in the country with a score of 0.871.

== Transportation ==
=== Road transportation ===
The canton is covered by the following road routes:

- National Route 22
- National Route 27
- National Route 121
- National Route 147
- National Route 310
- National Route 311

== Culture ==
=== Music and Visual Arts ===
The canton is served by the Municipal School of Integrated Arts, which is located in the canton's head city of Santa Ana. It is funded by the canton's local government. The school was founded upon the approval of a proposal made by Dr. Jorge Luis Acevedo in 1998. The school also has an art gallery, also created in 1998, a café, and several sculptures and statues along the school's entrance. The school holds several events, including a Baroque music festival, and the "Luz de Luna Verano" ("Summer Moonlight") festival, which is based on traditional Costa Rican culture.

=== Symbols ===
==== Flag ====
The canton's flag

Adopted by the municipal council of the canton on April 22, 1987, the flag consists of three symmetrical horizontal stripes. The top most green stripe represents the canton's nature and fields, the middle yellow stripe represents the sun (as the canton and the valley it resides in has been nicknamed "The Valley of the Sun"), and the lower most pink stripe representing the colour of the flowers of the Roble Sabana, another of the canton's symbols.

==== Coat of Arms ====
The canton's coat of arms

Designed in 1971, the coat of arm's shield features a valley, which is crossed by a path coming from a hill. Upon this hill is a Roble Sabana. It also features a man working with a shovel. Above the shield is a yellow medieval-style turret and a blue ribbon with the canton's name written on it. The shield is surrounded by two coffee branches. Below the shield is another blue ribbon, upon which is written the year of the canton's creation, 1907.

==== Roble de Sabana ====
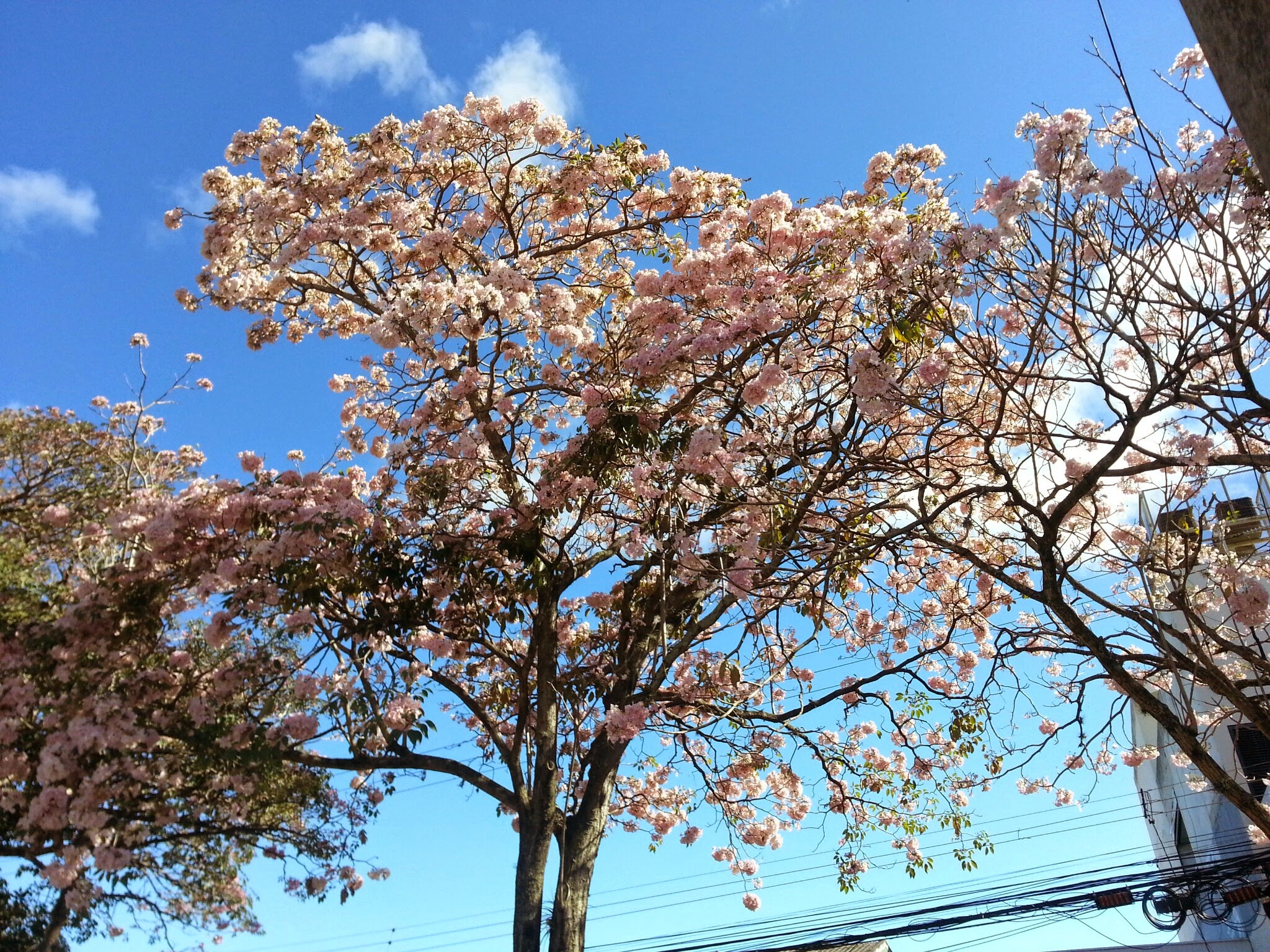
A Roble Sabana

The Tabebuia rosea (nicknamed "Roble de Sabana", meaning Savannah Oak) is native to Costa Rica, and can be seen in the country's warm areas. It was declared a symbol of the canton by Santa Ana's Municipal Council in ordinary session n.267 held on June 23, 2015. The tree can also be seen of the canton's coat of arms and flag.

=== The Onion and Agricultural Fairs ===
It is believed that the onion was introduced to the canton around 1915, with most farmers of the region subsidizing thanks to the vegetable. By 1970, approximately 200 hectares of onion were planted. However due to the region's urbanization, it is estimated that that number has lowered to around 50 hectares in modern times. The region's onions are known for a few of their characteristics: Their colourization, firmness, globe-like shape, as-well as the traditional cultivation and drying methods used during their production. The latter of these two methods leads to dry onions with golden-like skin, which makes them able to last around 3 months. In the canton, the highest production of the onion is seen between September and March. The region's onions only have one harvest season, between March and April.

The canton hosts the Feria de la Cebolla ("Onion's Fair"), a fair which is seen as one of Costa Rica's traditional fairs. Held since 1991, and held in the month of March, the fair is organized by the Centro Agrícola Cantonal ("Cantonal Agricultural Centre" or CAC). The 2017 and 2023 fairs were also organized by the Santa Ana municipality. The former was also organized by the Agencia de Extensión del Ministerio de Agricultura y Ganadería ("Extension Agency of the Ministry of Agriculture and Livestock" or MAG). The fair has also seen sales of churros, pupusas, other onion based products, handmade products (referred to as "artesanías" in Spanish), among others. The fair has also held sporting and musical events.

== Notable people ==
This is a list of people born or that have lived in Santa Ana.

- Alejandro Muñoz Villalobos: Economista y Educador. Él fue Director de la Maestría en Economía para el Desarrollo de la Universidad Nacional de Costa Rica (2013–2015), fue Presidente Ejecutivo de la Refinadora Costarricense de Petróleo RECOPE (2018–2022), en la administración del Presidente Carlos Alvarado Quesada
- Marcia González Aguiluz: Lawyer with an emphasis on environmental law. She was the president of the Citizens' Action Party between 2017 and 2018, as well as former minister of justice and peace under president Carlos Alvarado Quesada.
- María Luisa Ávila Agüero: A Pediatric subspecializing in infectious diseases who was the minister of health under presidents Óscar Arias Sánchez and Laura Chinchilla.
- Michael Umaña: Former football player who played as a defender.
- Carlos Martínez: Football player who currently plays at A.D. San Carlos as a defender.
- Marcial Aguiluz Orellana: A Honduran farmer who would join the Costa Rican legislative assembly on two occasions. He was a rebel figure in the 1948 civil war. He lived and died in the canton.

== Print sources ==
- Quesada, Octavio (1908). Santa Ana: límites del nuevo cantón (PDF). San Jose, CR: Tipografía Nacional. p. 146.
- Gómez Vargas, Sonia L.; Álvarez Masí, Yanory; González Vásquez, Fernando; Ruiz Briceño, Zaida (2010). Expresiones culturales de Escazú, Mora y Santa Ana (PDF). Ministerio de Cultura y Juventud. p. 134. ISBN 978-9977-59-211-4.
- Acevedo Vargas, Jorge Luis (2007). Santa Ana: Recursos Socioculturales (2nd ed.). Municipalidad de Santa Ana. p. 275.
- Aguiluz Barboza, Vilma (2009). Santa Ana: 100 Años de vida independiente (1st ed.). San José: Municipalidad de Santa Ana. p. 97.
