= National Route 27 (Costa Rica) =

Road in Costa Rica

National Primary Route 27
- Ruta nacional primaria 27
- Próspero Fernández National Road (segment); Carretera Nacional Próspero Fernández; José María Castro Madriz National Road; Carretera Nacional José María Castro Madriz; San José-Caldera Highway; Autopista San José-Caldera
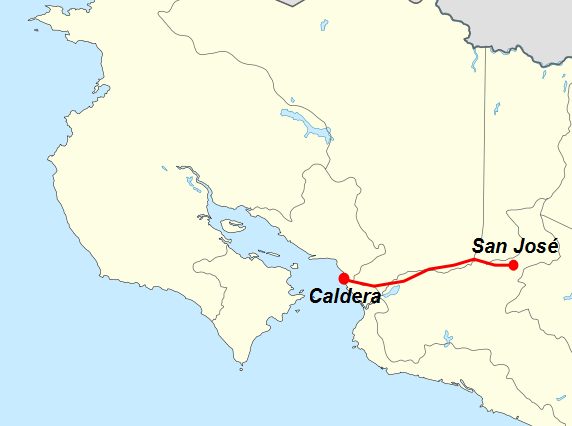

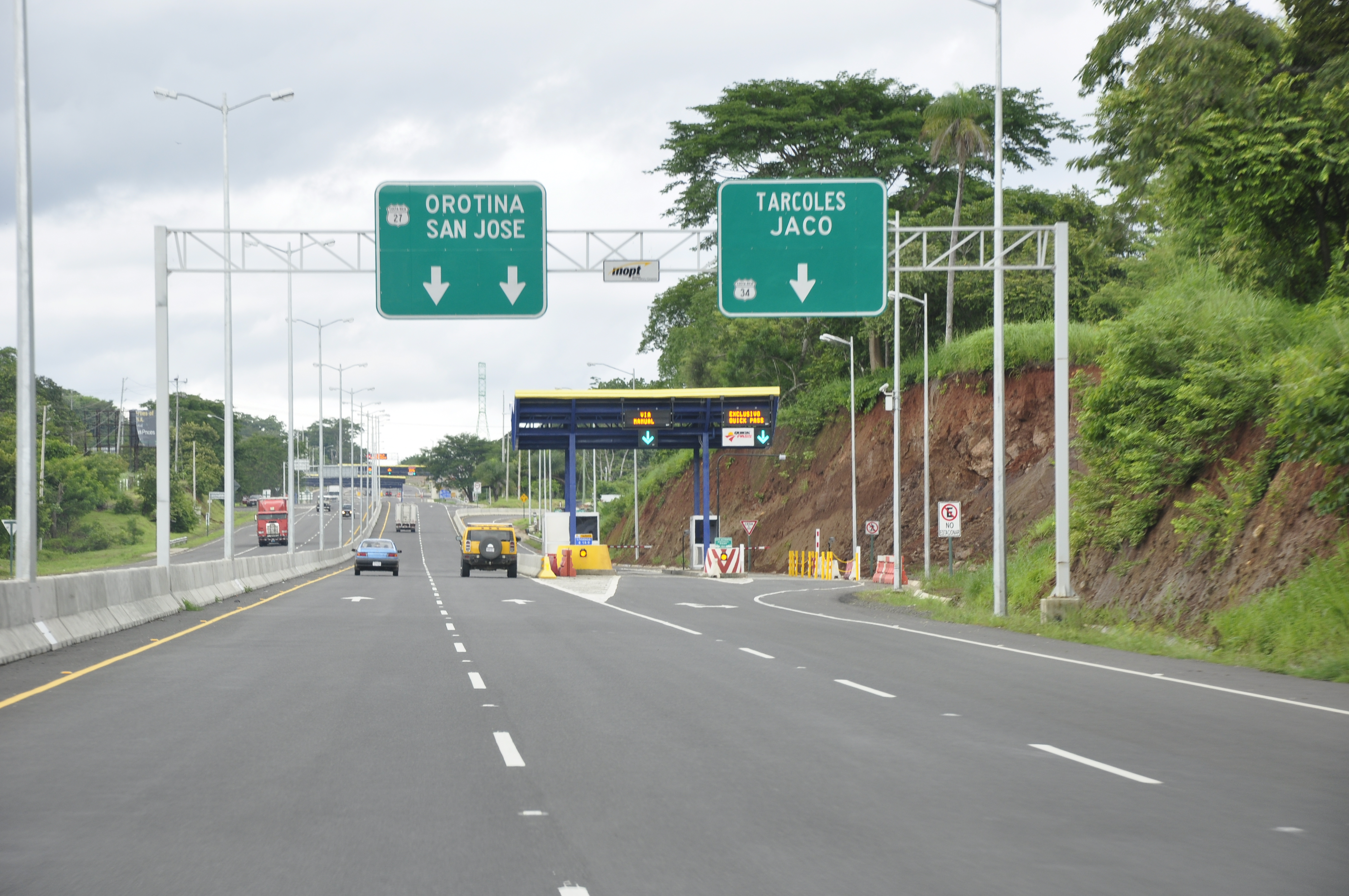
- Toll booth in Route 27

Route information
- Maintained by Globalvia Infraestructuras
- Length: 77 km (48 mi)
- Existed: 2010–present
- History: Opened in January 27, 2010

Major junctions
- East end: Route 1
- Route 39; Route 147; Route 124; Route 22; El Coyol arterial road Turrúcares arterial road Atenas arterial road Balsa arterial road Escobal; Hacienda Vieja; Route 34
- West end: Route 23

Location
- Country: Costa Rica
- Provinces: San José, Alajuela, Puntarenas

Highway system
- National Road Network of Costa Rica
| ← Route 23 | → Route 32 |

National Primary Route 27, or just Route 27 (Spanish: Ruta Nacional Primaria 27, or Ruta 27) is a National Road Route of Costa Rica, is a route which connects the Greater Metropolitan Area to Caldera Port and the Pacific coast of the country.

There are two named segments, from San José to Santa Ana the name is Carretera Nacional Próspero Fernández, and from Santa Ana to Caldera the name is Carretera Nacional José María Castro Madriz (José María Castro Madriz National Road), also known as Autopista San José-Caldera (San José-Caldera Highway),

== Description ==
The design of the route dates from 1978, due to financial, political and bad management, it was opened thirty-two years later, in several segments since 2005.

The route begins next to the National Gymnasium in Mata Redonda district of San José canton, and continues west with four lanes, two in each direction, then from the loop road Route 39 to the toll booths in Escazú there are six lanes, three in each direction. Afterward, until Ciudad Colón there are four lanes, two in each direction, then only two lanes, one in each direction until the junction with Route 23 at Caldera Port in Puntarenas.

In San José province the route covers San José canton (Hospital and Mata Redonda districts), Escazú canton (San Rafael district), Santa Ana canton (Pozos, Uruca, Piedades, and Brasil districts).

In Alajuela province the route covers Alajuela canton (San Antonio, Guácima, San Rafael, and Turrúcares districts), Atenas canton (Jesús, Concepción, and Escobal districts), Orotina canton (Orotina, El Mastate, Hacienda Vieja, Coyolar, and La Ceiba districts).

In Puntarenas province the route covers Esparza canton (Caldera district).

In the holidays, the route becomes mostly a single direction highway eastwards from Caldera to San José in advantage of the returning beach goers coming back to the Greater Metropolitan Area.

=== Toll booths ===
There are four toll booths at San Rafael de Escazú, San Rafael de Alajuela, Atenas, and Orotina.

== History ==
In 1973, the José Figueres Ferrer administration decided to relocate the main Pacific port from Puntarenas to Caldera bay, making it evident that with a new highway connecting Ciudad Colón with Orotina, the new port would be only 80 km from San José, just an hour away.

In the mid-1970s, a preliminary design was drafted along the left (south) margin of the Virilla River (crossing towns such as El Rodeo, Piedras Negras and San Pablo de Turrubares) that seemed the most economical, passing through low-cost uncultivated lands. But over time the elected design was along the right (north) margin of the river (La Guácima, Turrúcares, Concepción), which had more expensive lands for expropriation.

The financial crisis in the early 1980s prevented further progress. However, in 1986 in the first government of Óscar Arias (1986–1990), US$40 million was obtained from the Inter-American Development Bank (IDB) to build the new road, although that administration finished without the loan being used. The same happened during the four-year period of Rafael Ángel Calderón Fournier (1990-1994). The country didn't take advantage of the resources that had been made available, and the IDB withdrew the offered money upon expiration of the loan period of use. The country uselessly paid US$3 million in interest during this time.

At the end of the 1990s, without available financing, a private concession was considered, but it was necessary for the government to acquire more than half of the required lands, an opportunity that the owners took to their advantage to inflate the prices. Although they were reported to the Public Prosecutor's Office in 1997, it was considered that such abuse is not criminalized in the Criminal Code. In total, it took about twenty years to acquire the land for this work of public interest. Several major bridges were constructed in 1997 with US$25 million borrowed from Venezuela. They were completed and inaugurated in the administration of Miguel Ángel Rodríguez (1998–2002), and the road, which did not yet exist, was also inaugurated and named.

The administration of Abel Pacheco (2002–2006) tendered the project by concession in 2004, and only one bid was received, from the Argentine company José Cartellone, which soon went bankrupt. The company tried to give the contract to SNC-Lavalin of Canada, but a year later withdrew on the basis that the right of way was not yet available. When the second administration of Óscar Arias (2006–2010) arrived, the concession was negotiated directly with the Spanish company Autopistas del Valle, a winner of the San José-San Ramón highway since 2005, but it did not obtain immediate financing.

Finally, a sister consortium of Autopistas del Valle, called Autopistas del Sol, was hired to build the Ciudad Colón-Orotina section and also to improve the La Sabana-Ciudad Colón and Orotina-Caldera sections, which were already built. This raised the cost to US$120 million. The company claimed that the road would cost 3 times more (US$370 million) than budgeted. The road infrastructure was mostly completed five years after initially expected, but this delay was not penalized. The road designs that were used were more than 30 years old, and were already obsolete by the time that they were being built, but they were used nonetheless because changing them would have involved a larger budget and more expropriations.

The toll collection charged to the concessionaire began while the route was still unfinished. Users were very critical of the amount to be paid and the location of the collection booths. In addition, the concessionaire managed to get the contract to include a guarantee of a "minimum annual income", so that if the toll collected does not reach the expected amount, the government will have to pay the remainder.

With such controversies and without having been completed in its entirety, the road officially opened on January 27, 2010, with an intense and continuous period of construction from January 9, 2008.

Since then, the highway was delivered and managed by Autopistas del Sol with a public works concession contract (Law 7762 of Costa Rica) for its maintenance, for an extended period of 25 years. Together with the Constructora San José-Caldera, the concessionaire worked overtime to finish as soon as possible.

I}n March 2014 Autopistas del Sol sold most of its shares to the Spanish company Globalvia Infraestructuras, with which the latter assumed control of the concession.

To carry out the work, technologies such as hydro-demolition, rubblizing, the use of carbon fiber and the manufacture and extension of asphalts were implemented. On average, the trip to Caldera can be done in just over an hour, when it would take up to two hours by using Route 1.

== Exit list ==
Note: Some exits may be un-numbered

| Province | Municipality | Exits / Salidas | Notes |
|---|---|---|---|
| Puntarenas | Esparza | National Route 23 | Western terminus |
| Puntarenas | Esparza | National Route 622 | |
| Puntarenas | Esparza | National Route 755 | Incomplete Interchange |
| Alajuela | Casajal | Trinidad Vieja | |

=== Future widening ===
As the 1970s design proved to be obsolete upon opening due to having only one lane in each direction for most of the route, there have been plans to widen the road. For example, in 2017 Costa Rica’s National Concessions Council (CNC) noted that the road had reached a saturation point of 70 percent, which qualified for expansion. In 2020, the Costa Rican government and the current concessionaire Globalvia signed a letter of understanding to negotiate a process for conducing studies on the expansion of the road from San Jose to Caldera. It is estimated that this road expansion work would cost about $600 million. This would likely be paid for by extending the concession contract to Globalvia for a further 15 years beyond the expiration of the current concession. The anticipated first phase of widening is set to involve the area between the National Gymnasium and the Siquiares exchange and will include the construction of a new overpass to unload traffic at the highway’s terminus. The Costan Rican National Development and Public Investment Plan 2023-2026 calls for this widening work to be 75% complete by 2026.
