= El Mastate =

District in Orotina canton, Alajuela province, Costa Rica

- District
- Interactive map of El Mastate
- El Mastate district location in Costa Rica
- Coordinates: 9.9168491°N 84.5591748°W
- Country: Costa Rica
- Province: Alajuela
- Canton: Orotina

Area
  - Total: 9.53 km^{2} (3.68 sq mi)
- Elevation: 197 m (646 ft)

Population (2011)
  - Total: 1,821
  - Density: 191/km^{2} (495/sq mi)
- Time zone: UTC−06:00
- Postal code: 20902

El Mastate is a district of the Orotina canton, in the Alajuela province of Costa Rica.

== Geography ==
El Mastate has an area of 9.53 km^{2} and an elevation of 197 metres.

== Demographics ==
Historical population
Census	Pop.	±% p.a.
1883	414	—
1892	519	+2.54%
1927	404	−0.71%
1950	441	+0.38%
1963	680	+3.39%
1973	917	+3.04%
1984	1,019	+0.96%
2000	1,624	+2.96%
2011	1,821	+1.05%
2022	2,180	+1.65%
Source: Instituto Nacional de Estadística y Censos; Centro Centroamericano de Población

For the 2011 census, El Mastate had a population of 1,821 inhabitants.

== Transportation ==
=== Road transportation ===
The district is covered by the following road routes:

- National Route 27
- National Route 757
