= Orotina (canton) =

Canton in Alajuela province, Costa Rica

- Canton
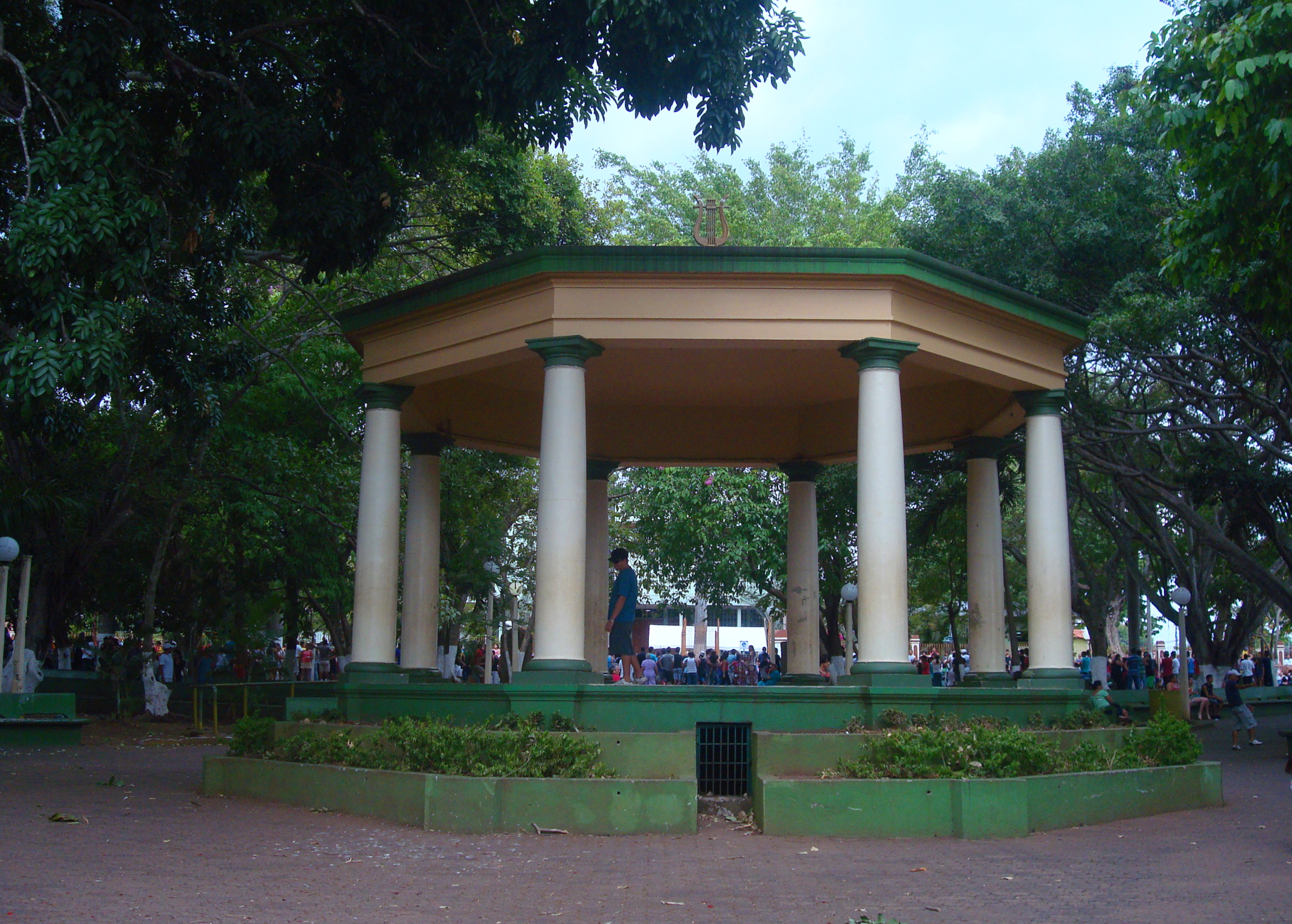
- Orotina Central Park

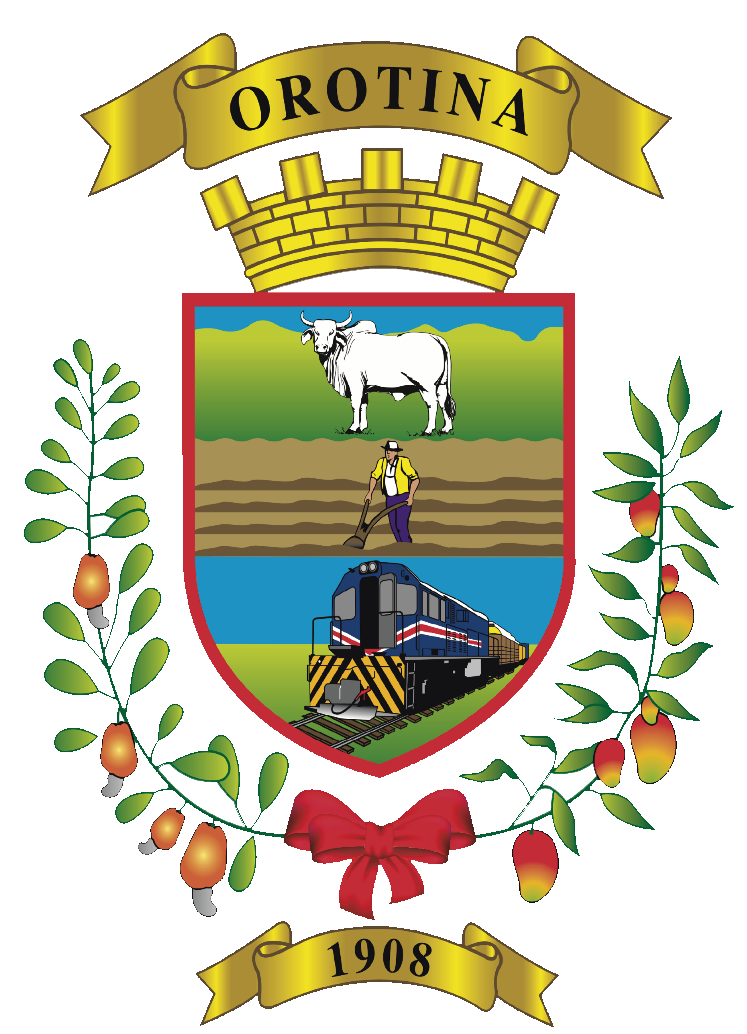
- Flag Seal
- Orotina canton
- Orotina canton location in Alajuela Province Orotina canton location in Costa Rica
- Coordinates: 9.8926261°N 84.5757166°W
- Country: Costa Rica
- Province: Alajuela
- Creation: 1 August 1908
- Head city: Orotina
- Districts: Districts: Orotina; El Mastate; Hacienda Vieja; Coyolar; La Ceiba

Government
  - Type: Municipality
  - Body: Municipalidad de Orotina

Area
  - Total: 141.92 km^{2} (54.80 sq mi)
- Elevation: 198 m (650 ft)

Population (2011)
  - Total: 20,341
  - Density: 143.33/km^{2} (371.22/sq mi)
- Time zone: UTC−06:00
- Canton code: 209
- Website: muniorotina.go.cr

Orotina is a canton in the Alajuela province of Costa Rica. The head city of the canton is also called Orotina.

== History ==
Orotina was created on 1 August 1908 by decree 39.

== Geography ==
Orotina has an area of 141.92 km^{2} and a mean elevation of 198 metres.

The canton lies on the western side of the Coastal Mountain Range between the Jesús María River and Machuca River on the north and the Grande de Tárcoles River on the south.

== Districts ==
The canton of Orotina is subdivided into the following districts:

1. Orotina
2. El Mastate
3. Hacienda Vieja
4. Coyolar
5. La Ceiba

== Demographics ==
Historical population
Census	Pop.	±% p.a.
1927	4,151	—
1950	5,951	+1.58%
1963	7,093	+1.36%
1973	8,479	+1.80%
1984	10,494	+1.96%
2000	15,705	+2.55%
2011	20,341	+2.38%
2022	24,217	+1.60%
Source: Instituto Nacional de Estadística y Censos; Centro Centroamericano de Población

For the 2011 census, Orotina had a population of 20,341 inhabitants.

== Transportation ==
=== Road transportation ===
The canton is covered by the following road routes:

- National Route 3
- National Route 27
- National Route 34
- National Route 137
- National Route 757
