= National Route 310 (Costa Rica) =

National Road Route in Costa Rica

National Tertiary Route 310
- Ruta nacional terciaria 310

Route information
- Maintained by Ministry of Public Works and Transport
- Length: 10.050 km (6.245 mi)

Location
- Country: Costa Rica
- Provinces: San José

Highway system
- National Road Network of Costa Rica
← Route 309	→ Route 311

National Tertiary Route 310, or just Route 310 (Spanish: Ruta Nacional Terciaria 310, or Ruta 310) is a National Road Route of Costa Rica, located in the San José province.

== Description ==
In San José province the route covers Escazú canton (San Rafael district), Santa Ana canton (Santa Ana, Pozos districts).
