= Piedades =

District in Santa Ana canton, San José province, Costa Rica

- District
- Piedades district
- Piedades district location in Costa Rica
- Coordinates: 9.9160239°N 84.2086038°W
- Country: Costa Rica
- Province: San José
- Canton: Santa Ana

Area
  - Total: 12.01 km^{2} (4.64 sq mi)
- Elevation: 899 m (2,949 ft)

Population (2011)
  - Total: 8,128
  - Density: 676.8/km^{2} (1,753/sq mi)
- Time zone: UTC−06:00
- Postal code: 10905

Piedades is a district of the Santa Ana canton, in the San José province of Costa Rica.

== Geography ==
Piedades has an area of 12.01 km^{2} and an elevation of 899 metres.

== Locations ==
Its neighborhoods are:

- Caraña
- Cebadilla
- Finquitas
- Montaña del Sol
- Rincón San Marcos
- Triunfo.

== Demographics ==
Historical population
| Census | Pop. | ±% p.a. |
|---|---|---|
| 1927 | 663 | — |
| 1950 | 1,004 | +1.82% |
| 1963 | 1,663 | +3.96% |
| 1973 | 2,642 | +4.74% |
| 1984 | 3,614 | +2.89% |
| 2000 | 6,199 | +3.43% |
| 2011 | 8,128 | +2.49% |
| 2022 | 9,393 | +1.32% |
Source: Instituto Nacional de Estadística y Censos; Centro Centroamericano de Población

For the 2011 census, Piedades had a population of 8,128 inhabitants.

== Transportation ==
=== Road transportation ===
The district is covered by the following road routes:

- National Route 22
- National Route 27
- National Route 121
