= La Ceiba District =

District in Orotina canton, Alajuela province, Costa Rica

La Ceiba
- District
- Interactive map of La Ceiba
- La Ceiba district location in Costa Rica
- Coordinates: 9.8980338°N 84.6301941°W
- Country: Costa Rica
- Province: Alajuela
- Canton: Orotina

Area
  - Total: 60.55 km^{2} (23.38 sq mi)
- Elevation: 122 m (400 ft)

Population (2011)
  - Total: 1,922
  - Density: 31.74/km^{2} (82.21/sq mi)
- Time zone: UTC−06:00
- Postal code: 20905

La Ceiba is a district of the Orotina canton, in the Alajuela province of Costa Rica.

== Geography ==
La Ceiba has an area of 60.55 km^{2} and an elevation of 122 metres.

== Demographics ==
Historical population
Census	Pop.	±% p.a.
1927	244	—
1950	669	+4.48%
1963	743	+0.81%
1973	812	+0.89%
1984	1,047	+2.34%
2000	1,510	+2.32%
2011	1,922	+2.22%
2022	2,407	+2.07%
Source: Instituto Nacional de Estadística y Censos; Centro Centroamericano de Población

For the 2011 census, La Ceiba had a population of 1,922 inhabitants.

== Transportation ==
=== Road transportation ===
The district is covered by the following road routes:

- National Route 27
