= National Route 311 (Costa Rica) =

National Road Route in Costa Rica

National Tertiary Route 311
- Ruta nacional terciaria 311

Route information
- Maintained by Ministry of Public Works and Transport
- Length: 3.180 km (1.976 mi)

Location
- Country: Costa Rica
- Provinces: San José

Highway system
- National Road Network of Costa Rica
← Route 310	→ Route 312

National Tertiary Route 311, or just Route 311 (Spanish: Ruta Nacional Terciaria 311, or Ruta 311) is a National Road Route of Costa Rica, located in the San José province.

== Description ==
In San José province the route covers Santa Ana canton (Santa Ana, Salitral districts).
