= Orotina =

District in Orotina canton, Alajuela province, Costa Rica

- District
- Orotina district
- Orotina district location in Costa Rica
- Coordinates: 9.9023536°N 84.5250233°W
- Country: Costa Rica
- Province: Alajuela
- Canton: Orotina

Area
  - Total: 21.59 km^{2} (8.34 sq mi)
- Elevation: 229 m (751 ft)

Population (2011)
  - Total: 9,664
  - Density: 447.6/km^{2} (1,159/sq mi)
- Time zone: UTC−06:00
- Postal code: 20901

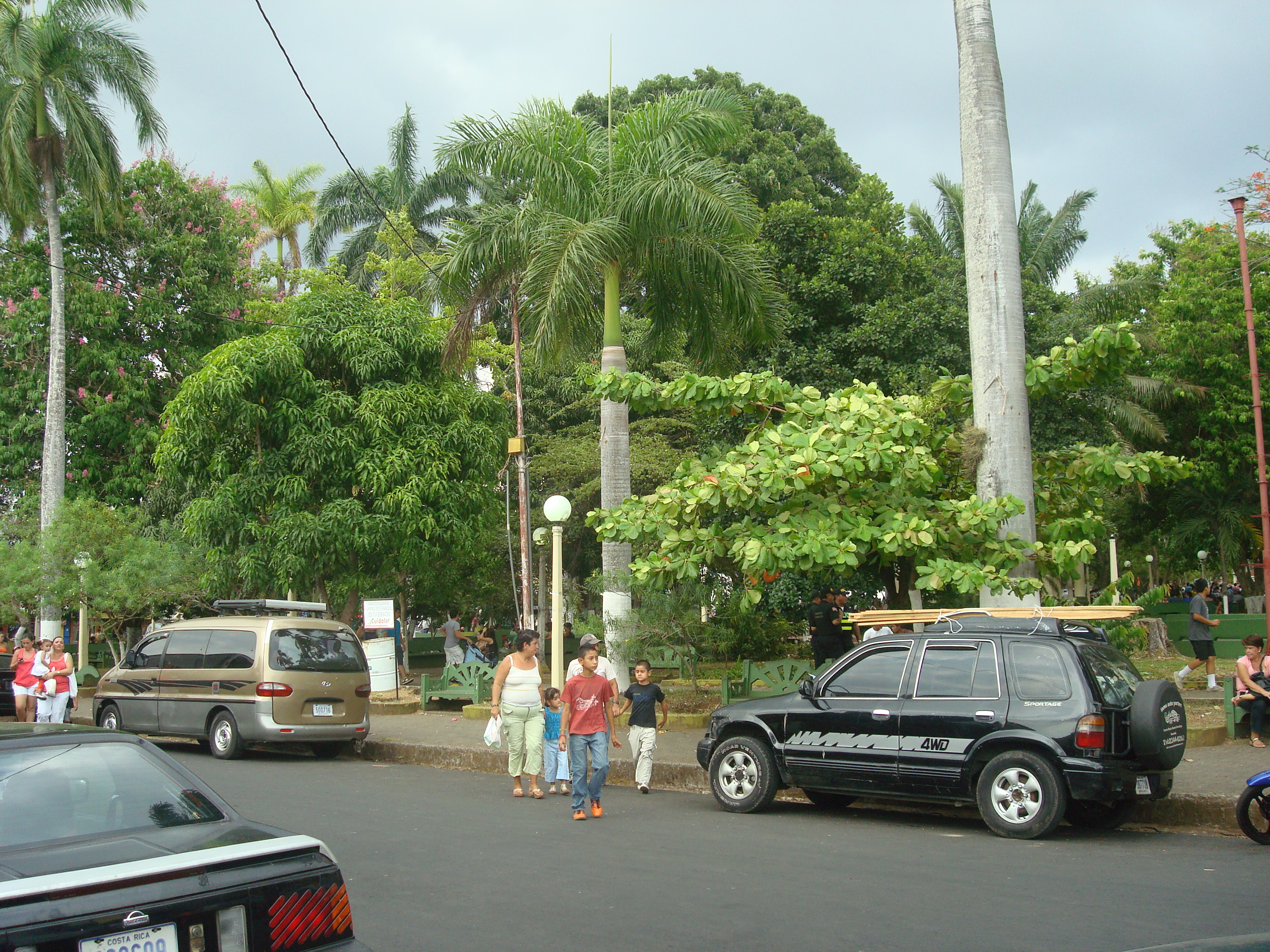
Street in Orotina, Alajuela province, Costa Rica

Orotina is a district of the Orotina canton, in the Alajuela province of Costa Rica.

== Geography ==
Orotina has an area of 21.59 km^{2} and an elevation of 229 metres. It is in a relatively flat section on the west side of the coastal mountain range of Costa Rica. It is 26 kilometers northeast of the Pacific Ocean at Tárcoles, 48 kilometers southwest of the provincial capital city of Alajuela, and 66 kilometers from the national capital city of San Jose.

== Demographics ==
Historical population
Census	Pop.	±% p.a.
1927	2,294	—
1950	3,018	+1.20%
1963	3,925	+2.04%
1973	5,038	+2.53%
1984	6,539	+2.40%
2000	8,045	+1.30%
2011	9,664	+1.68%
2022	10,880	+1.08%
Source: Instituto Nacional de Estadística y Censos; Centro Centroamericano de Población

For the 2011 census, Orotina had a population of 9,664 inhabitants.

== Transportation ==
=== Road transportation ===
With the National Route 27 completed the time it takes to get from the capital to Orotina is just about 45 minutes, instead of the 80–90 minutes it used to take.

The district is covered by the following road routes:

- National Route 3
- National Route 27
- National Route 137
- National Route 757

=== Airport plans ===
In 2017 the Government confirmed that Costa Rica's New Metropolitan International Airport would be built in Orotina in 2027. However, the plans were shelved indefinitely by December 2019.

== Schools ==
- Primo Vargas Valverde: an elementary school located across from the town park.
- Instituto Agropecuario de Orotina: a secondary school.
- Sistema Educativo Santa Fe Pacific: Kirden Garten, Elementary and High School
- San Rafael Highschool: High School
- Little People School: bilingual preschool.
