= Coyolar =

District in Orotina canton, Alajuela province, Costa Rica

- District
- Interactive map of Coyolar
- Coyolar district location in Costa Rica
- Coordinates: 9.8741352°N 84.5768772°W
- Country: Costa Rica
- Province: Alajuela
- Canton: Orotina

Area
  - Total: 36.51 km^{2} (14.10 sq mi)
- Elevation: 174 m (571 ft)

Population (2011)
  - Total: 5,912
  - Density: 161.9/km^{2} (419.4/sq mi)
- Time zone: UTC−06:00
- Postal code: 20904

Coyolar is a district of the Orotina canton, in the Alajuela province of Costa Rica.

== Geography ==
Coyolar has an area of 36.51 km^{2} and an elevation of 174 metres.

== Demographics ==
Historical population
Census	Pop.	±% p.a.
1927	724	—
1950	1,081	+1.76%
1963	971	−0.82%
1973	946	−0.26%
1984	1,161	+1.88%
2000	3,636	+7.40%
2011	5,912	+4.52%
2022	7,581	+2.29%
Source: Instituto Nacional de Estadística y Censos; Centro Centroamericano de Población

For the 2011 census, Coyolar had a population of 5,912 inhabitants.

== Transportation ==
=== Road transportation ===
The district is covered by the following road routes:

- National Route 27
- National Route 34
- National Route 757
