= Salitral =

District in Santa Ana canton, San José province, Costa Rica

- District
- Salitral district
- Salitral district location in Costa Rica
- Coordinates: 9.8945976°N 84.1703811°W
- Country: Costa Rica
- Province: San José
- Canton: Santa Ana

Area
  - Total: 20.2 km^{2} (7.8 sq mi)
- Elevation: 1,022 m (3,353 ft)

Population (2011)
  - Total: 4,304
  - Density: 213/km^{2} (552/sq mi)
- Time zone: UTC−06:00
- Postal code: 10902

Salitral is a district of the Santa Ana canton, in the San José province of Costa Rica.

== Geography ==
Salitral has an area of 20.2 km^{2} and an elevation of 1,022 metres.

== Demographics ==
Historical population
Census	Pop.	±% p.a.
1892	898	—
1927	783	−0.39%
1950	1,085	+1.43%
1963	1,267	+1.20%
1973	1,645	+2.65%
1984	2,049	+2.02%
2000	3,369	+3.16%
2011	4,304	+2.25%
2022	4,626	+0.66%
Source: Instituto Nacional de Estadística y Censos; Centro Centroamericano de Población

For the 2011 census, Salitral had a population of 4,304 inhabitants.

== Transportation ==
=== Road transportation ===
The district is covered by the following road routes:

- National Route 311
