= Pozos =

District in Santa Ana canton, San José province, Costa Rica

- District
- Pozos district
- Pozos district location in Costa Rica
- Coordinates: 9.9535857°N 84.1925835°W
- Country: Costa Rica
- Province: San José
- Canton: Santa Ana

Area
  - Total: 13.34 km^{2} (5.15 sq mi)
- Elevation: 847 m (2,779 ft)

Population (2011)
  - Total: 15,585
  - Density: 1,168/km^{2} (3,026/sq mi)
- Time zone: UTC−06:00
- Postal code: 10903

Pozos is a district in Santa Ana canton, San José province of Costa Rica. It was created in 1907. The principal avenue of the district carries the name of Lindora, which is also used to name the district and its surroundings.

== Toponymy ==
Pozos is translated as ponds, of which there were many due to clay terrains at the north part of the district.

== Geography ==
Pozos has an area of 13.34 km^{2} and an elevation of 847 metres.

== Villages ==
The district encompasses the Bosques de Lindora, Honduras, Lagos, Montana, Valle del Sol, Villa Real, Villas del Sol, and Vista Azul villages.

== Demographics ==
Historical population
Census	Pop.	±% p.a.
1927	712	—
1950	1,194	+2.27%
1963	1,415	+1.31%
1973	2,247	+4.73%
1984	3,558	+4.27%
2000	9,025	+5.99%
2011	15,585	+5.09%
2022	17,516	+1.07%
Source: Instituto Nacional de Estadística y Censos; Centro Centroamericano de Población

For the 2011 census, Pozos had a population of 15,585 inhabitants.

== Transportation ==
=== Road transportation ===
The district is covered by the following road routes:

- National Route 27
- National Route 147
- National Route 310
