= Parque Valle del Sol =

Coordinates: 9.95256°N 84.20613°W

Parque Valle del Sol is a residential and golf community located in Santa Ana, Costa Rica.
