= National Route 757 (Costa Rica) =

National Road Route in Costa Rica

National Tertiary Route 757
- Ruta nacional terciaria 757

Route information
- Maintained by Ministry of Public Works and Transport
- Length: 11.805 km (7.335 mi)

Location
- Country: Costa Rica
- Provinces: Alajuela

Highway system
- National Road Network of Costa Rica
← Route 756	→ Route 760

National Tertiary Route 757, or just Route 757 (Spanish: Ruta Nacional Terciaria 757, or Ruta 757) is a National Road Route of Costa Rica, located in the Alajuela province.

== Description ==
In Alajuela province the route covers Orotina canton (Orotina, El Mastate, and Coyolar districts).
