= Party of the Sun (Costa Rica) =

Party of the Sun Partido del Sol
- Founded: 18 February 1997
- Ideology: Regionalism

Party flag

Website
- partidodelsol.com

The Party of the Sun (Spanish: Partido del Sol) is a political party in Santa Ana, Costa Rica. The party was founded on February 17, 1997. The president is Patricia Segovia Pinto and the party secretary Gastón Vargas Rojas.
