= National Route 22 (Costa Rica) =

National Road Route in Costa Rica

National Primary Route 22
- Ruta nacional primaria 22

Route information
- Maintained by Ministry of Public Works and Transport
- Length: 4.350 km (2.703 mi)

Location
- Country: Costa Rica
- Provinces: San José

Highway system
- National Road Network of Costa Rica
← Route 21	→ Route 23

National Primary Route 22, or just Route 22 (Spanish: Ruta Nacional Primaria 22, or Ruta 22) is a National Road Route of Costa Rica, located in the San José province. It is also known as Radial Colón.

== Description ==
In San José province the route covers Mora canton (Colón district), Santa Ana canton (Piedades and Brasil districts).
