= Parque Zoológico Nacional Simón Bolívar =

Zoo and botanical garden in Costa Rica

- Parque zoológico y jardín botánico nacional Simón Bolívar
- Interactive map of Parque Zoológico Nacional Simón Bolívar
- Type: Urban park. Zoo, Botanical Garden.
- Location: San José, Costa Rica
- Coordinates: 9°56′19″N 84°04′24″W
- Area: 14 acres (57,000 m^{2})
- Created: 1916 (Botanical Garden); 1921 (Zoo)
- Operator: Fundazoo
- Status: Open all year
- Website: fundazoo.org/web

Parque Nacional Simón Bolívar (Zoológico Simón Bolívar) is an urban park of approximately 14 hectares, located in downtown San José, Costa Rica. It is the oldest botanical garden and zoo in Costa Rica. The name pays homage to Latin American national founder Simón Bolívar. It is administered by a conservation nonprofit foundation called Fundazoo. All animals in the zoo are orphaned, injured or have been disabled and are nursed back to health in hopes of releasing them.

Since 2013, activists have been procuring legal means to close this and other zoos in Costa Rica, requesting animals be relocated to cage-free rescue centers.

== History ==
Simon Bolivar Zoo has its origin in the "Jardín de Plantas y Animales", a park created in 1884 by Swiss naturalist and botanist Henry Pittier. It was founded as an institution associated to the Costa Rican Geographic Institute. It was first located near Liceo de Costa Rica, but had to be later relocated because neighbors complained about the noise of the animals. It was eventually moved to its current location in Barrio Amón. It was established on 5 July 1916 and added a botanical garden on 24 July 1921, part of the anniversary celebration of Simón Bolivar's birth.

The park was managed by neighboring Museo Nacional de Costa Rica until 1953, when it was transferred to the Department of Fish and Wildlife of the Ministerio de Agricultura y Ganadería (Ministry of Agriculture and Livestock). In 1959, it was transferred to the Department of Lands and Forests of that ministry. In 1969, it was transferred once more, this time to the Department of National Parks of the Forestry Department.

With the future transformation of this department into the National Park Service, the new department managed the zoo until in 1986, when it was placed under the Ministry of Natural Resources, Energy and Mines (MIRENEM), currently Ministry of Environment, Energy and Telecommunications (MINAET). MINAET underwrote an agreement with the Pro Zoological Foundation in 1994, which is currently managing the site.

== Fauna ==
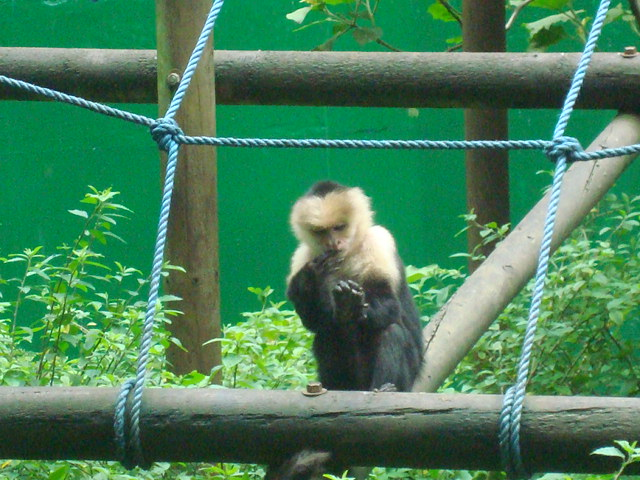
White-headed capuchin in its exhibit, June 2012

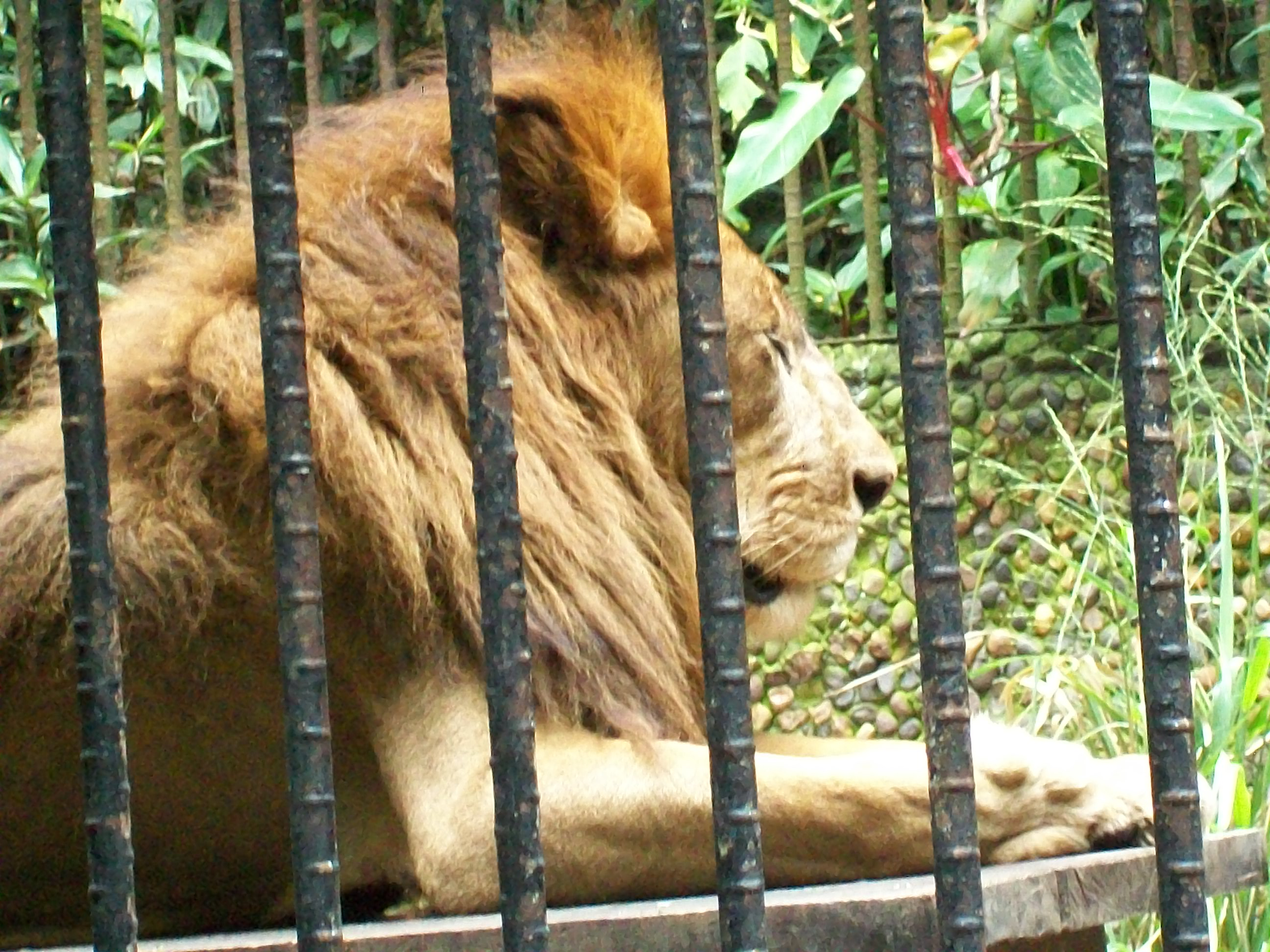
Kivú, the (now deceased) zoo's lion, in August 2016

In August 2017, the zoo held a collection of 11 species of mammals, about 30 species of birds, more than 10 species of reptiles, 2 species of frogs and 1 species of fish.

Species list August 2017:

Mammals;

- Mexican hairy dwarf porcupine;
- Central American tapir;
- Greater grison;
- Brutus, the jaguar;
- Grey Fox;
- Raccoons;
- Kinkajou;
- Hoffmann's Two-toed sloth;
- White-nosed coatis
- White-headed capuchin
- Black-handed spider monkey

Bird species include;

Great Curassow, Black Guan, Crested Guan, Gray-headed chachalaca, Indian peafowl, Gray Hawk, Swaison's Hawk, Bat Falcon, Barn Owl, Striped Owl, Spectacled Owl, Mottled Owl, Tropical Screech-Owl, Crimson-fronted parakeet, Olive-throated parakeet, Orange-chinned parakeet, White-crowned parrot, Yellow-naped parrot, Red-lored parrot, White-fronted parrot, Mealy Parrot, Great Green Macaw, Scarlet Macaw, Emerald Toucanet, Collared Aracari, Black-mandibled Toucan, Painted bunting and Yellow-bellied siskin

Other species include;

Various species of turtles, Emperor boa, Green vine snake, Side-lined Palm Pitviper, Tropical Rattlesnake, Fer-de-Lance, Eyelash Pitviper, American crocodile, Spectacled caiman, Strawberry poison frog, Blue-sided Tree Frog and Koi carp

== See also ==
- List of zoos by country: Costa Rica zoos
