= 1864 Costa Rican census =

Costa Rica 1864 Census
- November 27, 1864

General information
- Country: Costa Rica

Results
- Total population: 120,499
- Most populous canton: San José; 21,379
- Least populous canton: Golfo Dulce, with Térraba and Boruca; 931

Historical population
Census	Pop.	±% p.a.
1864	120,499	—
1883	182,073	+2.20%
1892	243,205	+3.27%
1927	471,524	+1.91%
1950	800,875	+2.33%
1963	1,336,274	+4.02%
1973	1,871,780	+3.43%
1984	2,416,809	+2.35%
2000	3,810,179	+2.89%
2011	4,301,712	+1.11%
2022	5,044,197	+1.46%
Source: Instituto Nacional de Estadística y Censos; Centro Centroamericano de Población

The Costa Rica 1864 Census was the first official census elaborated in the country by the Dirección General de Estadística y Censos, predecessor of current National Institute of Statistics and Census. The total population was at the moment 120,499.

== Results by canton ==
Province	Canton	Population as of 1864 census
San José	San José	21,379
San José	Escazú	8,760
San José	Desamparados	7,067
Alajuela	Alajuela	11,521
Alajuela	San Ramón	5,045
Alajuela	Grecia	5,738
Alajuela	San Mateo	1,682
Alajuela	Atenas	3,185
Cartago	Cartago	16,780
Cartago	Paraíso	4,238
Cartago	La Unión	2,046
Heredia	Heredia	14,073
Heredia	Barva	3,718
Guanacaste	Liberia	3,169
Guanacaste	Nicoya	2,407
Guanacaste	Santa Cruz	3,217
Guanacaste	Bagaces	1,638
Puntarenas	Puntarenas	2,942
Puntarenas	Litoral del Golfo de Nicoya	963
Puntarenas	Golfo Dulce, with Térraba and Boruca	931
