= National Route 121 (Costa Rica) =

National Road Route in Costa Rica

National Secondary Route 121
- Ruta nacional secundaria 121

Route information
- Maintained by Ministry of Public Works and Transport
- Length: 14.610 km (9.078 mi)

Location
- Country: Costa Rica
- Provinces: San José

Highway system
- National Road Network of Costa Rica
← Route 120	→ Route 122

National Secondary Route 121, or just Route 121 (Spanish: Ruta Nacional Secundaria 121, or Ruta 121) is a National Road Route of Costa Rica located in the San José province.

== Description ==
In San José province the route covers Escazú canton (San Rafael district), Mora canton (Colón district), and Santa Ana canton (Santa Ana, Uruca, Piedades districts).
