= Uruca District, Santa Ana =

District in Santa Ana canton, San José province, Costa Rica

Uruca
- District
- Uruca district
- Uruca district location in Costa Rica
- Coordinates: 9.920405°N 84.1979343°W
- Country: Costa Rica
- Province: San José
- Canton: Santa Ana

Area
  - Total: 7.07 km^{2} (2.73 sq mi)
- Elevation: 873 m (2,864 ft)

Population (2011)
  - Total: 7,200
  - Density: 1,000/km^{2} (2,600/sq mi)
- Time zone: UTC−06:00
- Postal code: 10904

Uruca is a district of the Santa Ana canton, in the San José province of Costa Rica. It is popularly called "Río de Oro".

== Geography ==
Uruca has an area of 7.07 km^{2} and an elevation of 873 metres.

== Locations ==
Its neighborhoods are:

- Chimba
- Guapinol
- Mata Grande
- Mina
- Paso Machete (part)
- Río Uruca

== Demographics ==
Historical population
Census	Pop.	±% p.a.
1927	482	—
1950	696	+1.61%
1963	1,182	+4.16%
1973	2,097	+5.90%
1984	3,267	+4.11%
2000	5,635	+3.47%
2011	7,200	+2.25%
2022	9,423	+2.48%
Source: Instituto Nacional de Estadística y Censos; Centro Centroamericano de Población

For the 2011 census, Uruca had a population of 7,200 inhabitants.

== Transportation ==
=== Road transportation ===
The district is covered by the following road routes:

- National Route 27
- National Route 121
