= Figueroa =

- Language: Galician, Portuguese, Spanish

Origin
- Region of origin: Galicia, Spain

Figueroa or Figueiroa is a Galician, Portuguese and Spanish surname.

Notable people with the surname include:

- Álvaro de Figueroa, 1st Count of Romanones (1863–1950), Spanish politician, Prime Minister (1912–1918)
- Amon Tobin (1972–), Brazilian musician, has released music as Figueroa
- Ángel Figueroa (1981–), Puerto Rican basketball player
- Ángel Figueroa (boxer) (1929–1953), Puerto Rican professional boxer and Korean War casualty
- Barbara Figueroa, American chef
- Bien Figueroa (1964–), Dominican baseball player
- Brandon Figueroa (1996–), US professional boxer
- Brian Figueroa (1999–), Mexican football player
- Bryan Figueroa (1999–), Chilean football player
- Carlos Figueroa, several people
- Daniel Figueroa (1983–), American baseball outfielder
- Danny Figueroa (1959–1998), American serial killer
- Don Figueroa (contemporary), US comic book artist
- Ed Figueroa (1948–), Puerto Rican baseball player
- Edwin Figueroa (1984–), US mixed martial artist
- Elder Figueroa (1980–), Colombian-born, naturalized Salvadoran football player
- Elías Figueroa (1946–), Chilean football player
- Elmer Figueroa, better known as Chayanne (1968–), Puerto Rican Latin pop singer and actor
- Emiliano Figueroa (1866–1931), President of Chile 1925–1927
- Enrique “Quique” Figueroa (1964–), Puerto Rican regatta sailor
- Erik Figueroa (1991–), Chilean-Swedish footballer
- Federico Brito Figueroa (1921–2000), Venezuelan historian and anthropologist
- Fernanda Figueroa (1997–), Costa Rican football player
- Fernando Figueroa (1849–1919), President of El Salvador 1907–1911
- Fernando Figueroa (footballer) (1925–2011), Mexican football player
- Francisco de Figueroa, several people
- Francisco Acuña de Figueroa (1790–1862), Uruguayan poet
- Francisco García de la Rosa Figueroa (18th century), Mexican monk
- Francisco Ramón Herboso y Figueroa (1720–1782), Peruvian archbishop
- Frank Figueroa (contemporary), agent of the US Department of Homeland Security, pleaded guilty to exposing himself
- Gabriel Figueroa (1907–1997), Mexican cinematographer
- Germán Figueroa (1975–), Puerto Rican professional wrestler
- Héctor Figueroa (1988–), Spanish football player
- Héctor Figueroa (activist) (1962–2019), Puerto Rican labor activist
- Hernán Figueroa (1927–2013), Chilean decathlete
- Jake Figueroa (2002–), Filipino basketball player
- Jasmin Figueroa (1985–), Filipina Olympic archer
- Javier Ángel Figueroa (1862–1945), Chilean lawyer and politician, brother of President Emiliano Figueroa
- Jerónimo Figueroa Cabrera (a.k.a. “Momo”) (1982–), Spanish professional football player
- Joaquín Figueroa (1863–1929), Chilean politician, brother of President Emiliano Figueroa
- John Figueroa (1920–1999), Jamaican poet and educator
- Jonathan Figueroa (a.k.a. “Amazing Red”; born 1982), US professional wrestler
- José Figueroa (1792–1835), General and the Mexican territorial Governor of Alta California
- José Figueroa Alcorta (1860–1931), President of Argentina 1906–1910
- José Manuel Figueroa (1975–), US singer, songwriter, and actor
- José Manuel Figueroa (weightlifter) (1939–), Puerto Rican Olympic weightlifter
- José María Figueroa Oreamuno (1820–1900), Costa Rican writer, geographer, and author of the Figueroa Album
- José Rubén Figueroa Smutny (1967–), Mexican politician
- Juan Figueroa, president of Universal Health Care Foundation of Connecticut
- L. J. Figueroa (1998–), Dominican-American basketball player
- LaToyia Figueroa (1981–2005), US woman who disappeared and was found murdered in 2005
- Liz Figueroa (contemporary), US politician, California state senator
- Liza Figueroa
- Luciano Gabriel “Lucho” Figueroa (1981–), Argentine football player
- Luis Figueroa (baseball) (1974–), Puerto Rican baseball player
- Luis Figueroa (singer) (1989–), US Latin pop singer-songwriter
- Luis de Guzmán y Figueroa, Spanish soldier and colonial governor of New Mexico from 1647 to 1649
- Maynor Figueroa (1983–), Honduran footballer
- Miguel Figueroa (1953–), head of the Communist Party of Canada
- Miguel Figueroa (swimmer) (1965–), Puerto Rican deportist
- Narciso Figueroa (1906–2004), Puerto Rican danza musician and composer
- Nelson Figueroa (1974–), US baseball player
- Omar Figueroa Jr. (1989–), US professional boxer
- Orlando Figueroa (a.k.a. NASA Mars Czar) (1955–), Puerto Rican engineer who became head of NASA Mars Exploration
- Óscar Figueroa (film editor) (1958–), Mexican film editor
- Óscar Figueroa (weightlifter) (1983–), Colombian weightlifter and silver medalist
- Paco Figueroa (1983–), American baseball second baseman
- Pedro de Castro y Figueroa (1685–1741), Spanish viceroy of New Spain 1740–1741
- Ramón Báez Figueroa (1956–), Dominican banker, accused of bank fraud in 2003
- Richard Figueroa (1996–), Venezuelan football player
- Rodner Figueroa (1972–), Venezuelan television show host
- Rodney Figueroa (1966–), Puerto Rican wrestler
- Rogelio Figueroa (1963–), Puerto Rican engineer and politician
- Sammy Figueroa, US percussionist
- Sotero Figueroa (1851–1923), journalist, dramatist, speaker and author
- Talyn Rahman-Figueroa (1985–), Diplomatic Director and novelist
- Tite Figueroa (1926–1986), Puerto Rican baseball player
- Tito Figueroa (1914–2004), Puerto Rican baseball player
- Tobías Figueroa (1992–). Argentine football player
- Tony Figueroa (1999–), Mexican football player
- Trini de Figueroa (1918–1972), Spanish romance novelist
- Víctor Figueroa (1983–), Argentine football player
- Víctor Figueroa (biathlete) (1956–), Argentine Olympic biathlete

== See also ==
- Higueras (surname)
- Juan Carlos Higuero, Spanish runner
