= History of Costa Rica =

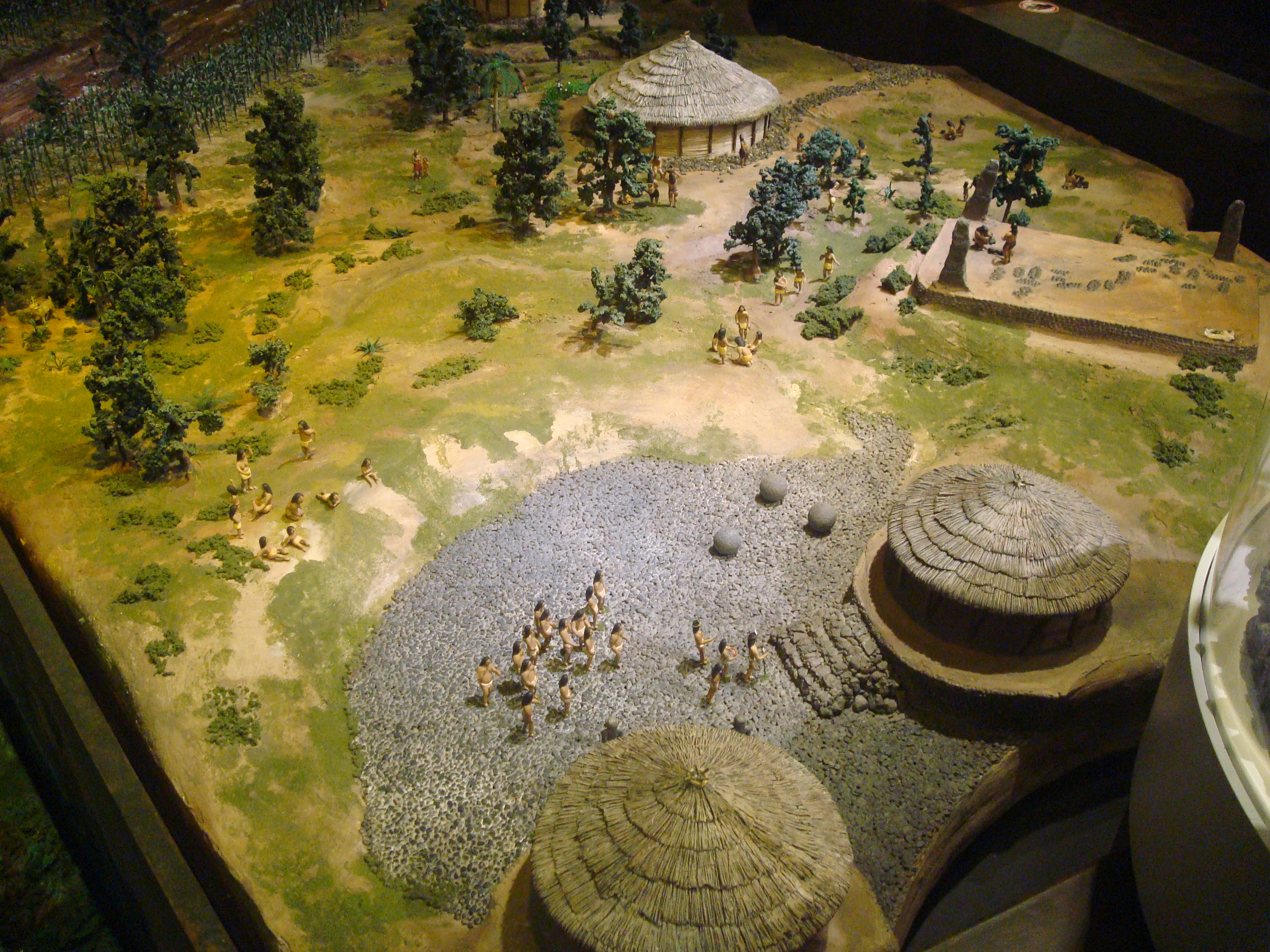
Typical settlement of the Diquis indigenous people before the arrival of Columbus.

The first indigenous peoples of Costa Rica were hunters and gatherers, and when the Spanish conquerors arrived, Costa Rica was divided in two distinct cultural areas due to its geographical location in the Intermediate Area, between Mesoamerican and the Andean cultures, with influences

of both cultures.

Christopher Columbus first dropped anchor in Costa Rica in 1503 at Isla Uvita. His forces overcame the indigenous people. Subsequent Spanish explorers incorporated the territory into the Captaincy General of Guatemala as a province of New Spain in 1524. For the next 300 years, Costa Rica was a part of Spain. As a result, Costa Rica's culture has been greatly influenced by the culture of Spain. During this period, Costa Rica remained sparsely developed and impoverished. Following the Mexican War of Independence (1810–1821), Costa Rica became part of the First Mexican Empire in 1821. In 1823, Costa Rica joined the Federal Republic of Central America, but degrading relations with the other states caused it to secede in 1838. But following its independence, its economy struggled due to a lack of connections with European suppliers. In 1856, Costa Rica, along with several other Central American countries, joined the Filibuster War to prevent William Walker from mounting a take-over of the Nicaraguan government. After 1869, Costa Rica established a democratic government.

In 1885 Bernardo Soto Alfaro joins to El Salvador, Nicaragua and Mexico to the Barrios' War of Reunification against the Guatemala of Justo Rufino Barrios and Honduras. After the Costa Rican Civil War of 1948, the government drafted a new constitution that established universal suffrage, strengthened civil liberties, and permanently abolished the military—an institutional choice that set Costa Rica apart from much of Central America during a period marked elsewhere by armed conflict and military rule. In the decades that followed, this demilitarization and emphasis on civilian governance contributed to the consolidation of a stable democratic system and sustained investment in social and political institutions. In the contemporary era, Costa Rica’s political continuity and relative regional stability have supported the development of an economy oriented toward services, technology, and ecotourism, even as long-standing fiscal pressures—particularly high public debt—continue to constrain state capacity and public finances.

== Hunter-gatherers ==
The oldest evidence of human occupation in Costa Rica is associated with the existence of groups of hunter-gatherers about 10,000 to 19,000 years BC, with ancient archaeological evidence (stone tool making) located in the Turrialba Valley, at sites called Guardiria and Florence, with matching quarry and workshop areas with presence of type clovis spearheads and South American inspired arrows. All this suggests the possibility that in this area two different cultures coexisted.

The people of this era were nomadic. They were organized in family-based bands of about 20 to 30 members. Their diet consisted of megafauna, such as giant armadillos and sloths, mastodons, etc. These became extinct about 8,000 years before the modern era. The first settlers had to adapt to hunting smaller animals and develop appropriate strategies to adjust to the new conditions.

== Pre-Columbian Costa Rica ==
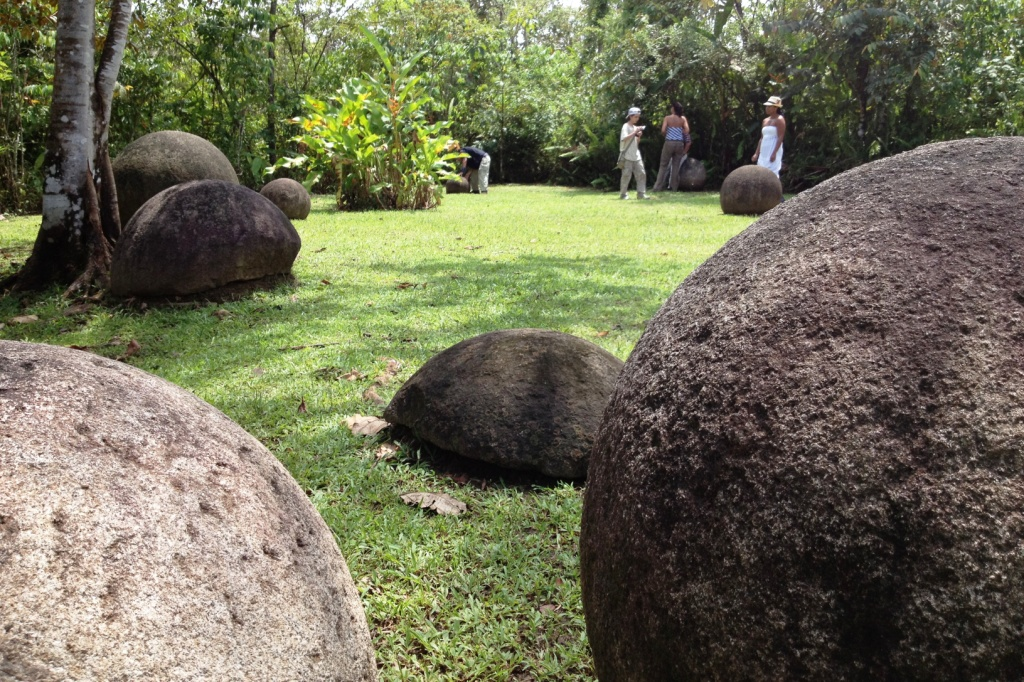
Pre-Columbian stone spheres made by the Diquis culture

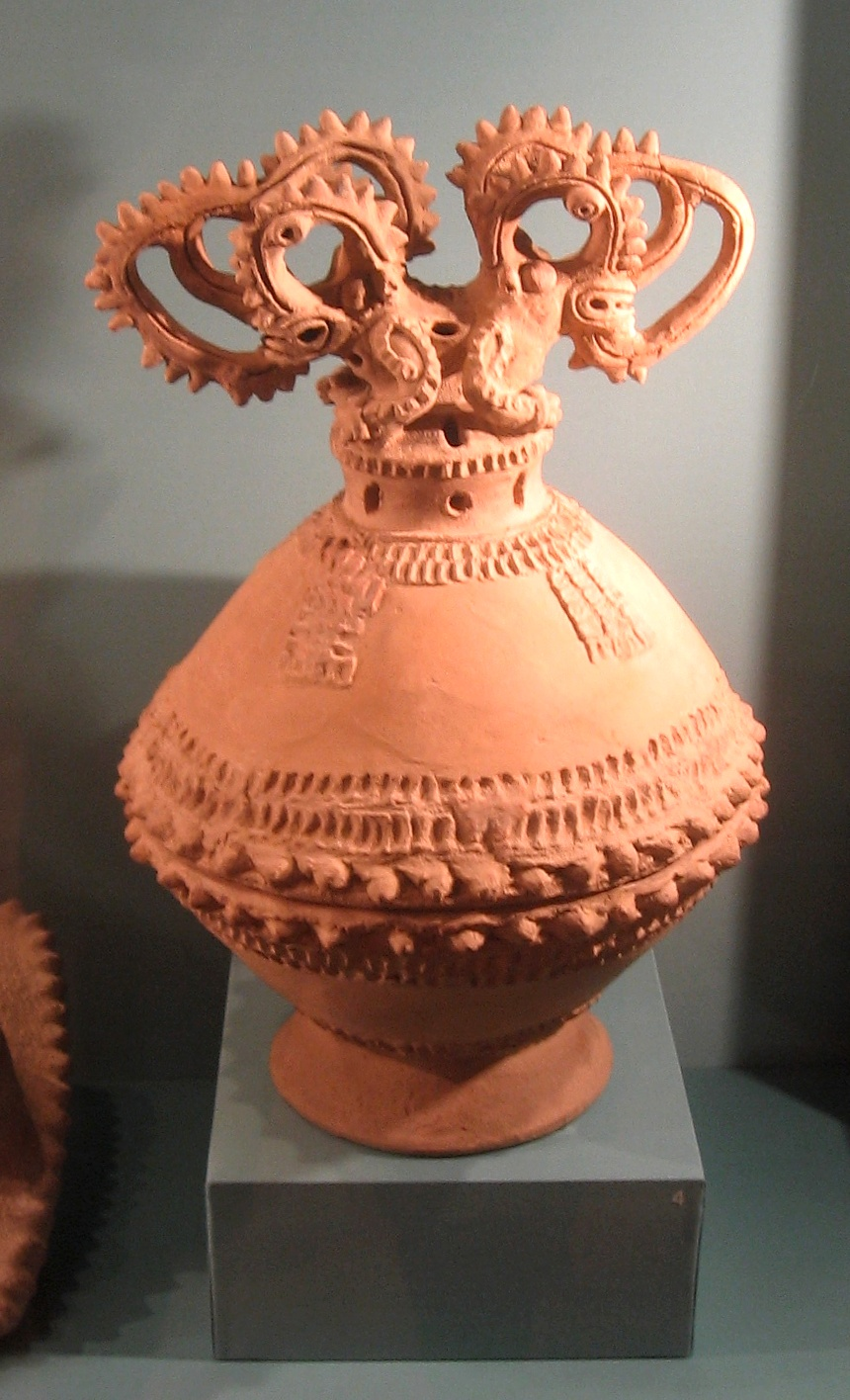
Ceramic incense burner

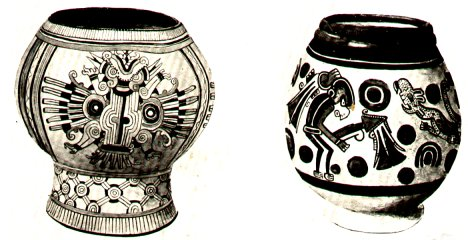
Pre-Columbian ceramics from the Nicoya culture

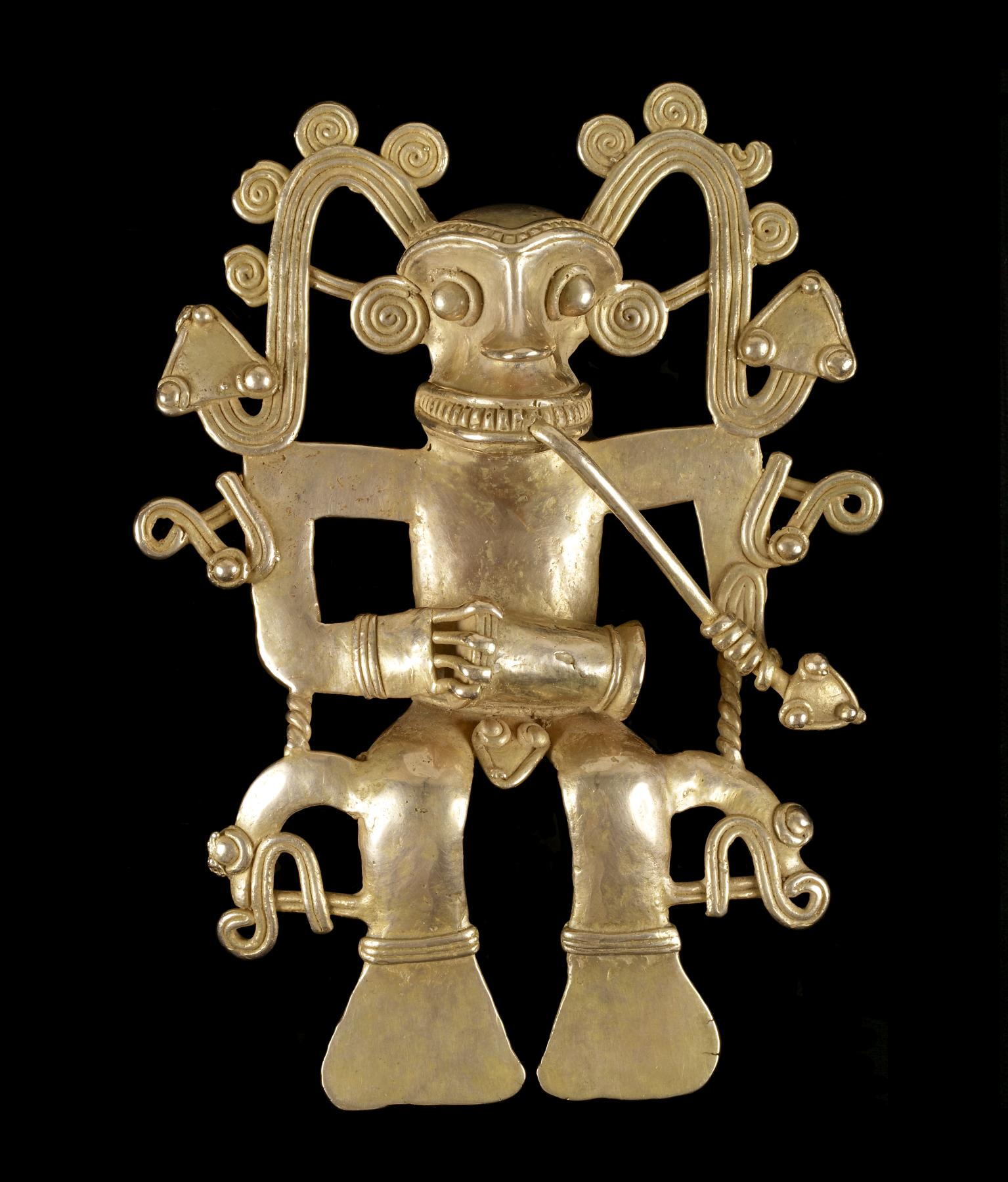
Diquis human effigy pendant

In Pre-Columbian times, the native peoples in what is now Costa Rica were divided in two cultural areas due to its geographical location in the Intermediate Area, between the Mesoamerican and the Andean cultural regions.

The northwest of the country, the Nicoya Peninsula, was the southernmost point of Mesoamerican cultural influence when the Spanish conquerors came in the sixteenth century. The Nicoya culture was the largest cacicazgo on the Pacific coast of Costa Rica. The central and southern portions of the country belonged to the Isthmo-Colombian cultural area with strong Muisca influences, as these were part of territories occupied predominantly by speakers of the Chibchan languages. The Diquis culture flourished from 700 CE to 1530 CE and were well known for their crafts in metal and stonework.

The indigenous people have influenced modern Costa Rican culture to a relatively small degree. In the years soon after European encounter, many of the people died due to infectious diseases, such as measles and smallpox, which were endemic among the Europeans but to which they had no immunity.

== Spanish colonization ==
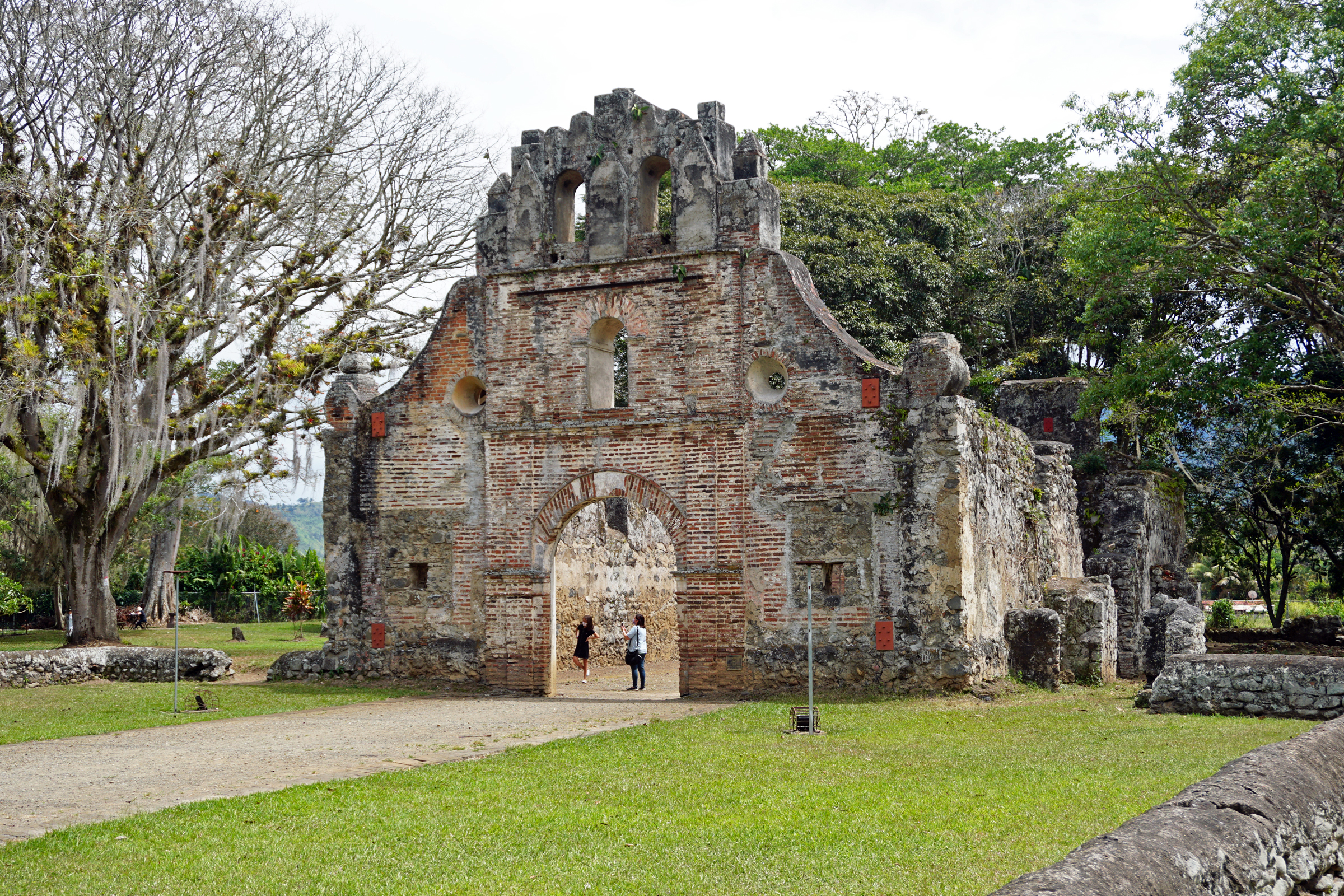
The Ujarrás historical site in the Orosí Valley, Cartago province. The church was built between 1686 and 1693 CE.

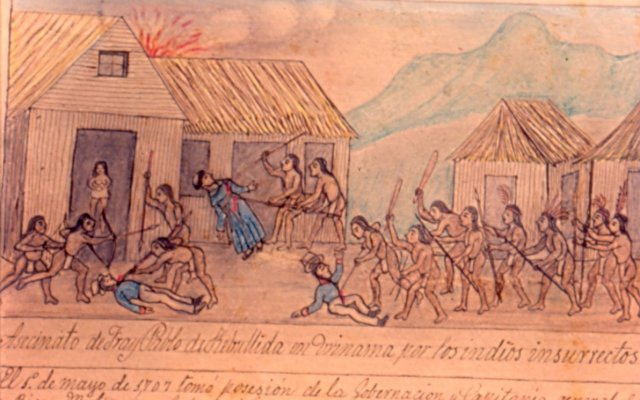
Violent uprising of Indians in Talamanca region, 1709 CE.

The colonial period began when Christopher Columbus reached the eastern coast of Costa Rica on his fourth voyage on September 18, 1502. Numerous subsequent Spanish expeditions followed, eventually leading to the first Spanish colony in Costa Rica, Villa de Bruselas, founded in 1524.

During most of the colonial period, Costa Rica was the southernmost province of the Captaincy General of Guatemala, which was nominally part of the Viceroyalty of New Spain (i.e., Mexico). In practice it operated as a largely autonomous entity within the Spanish Empire. Costa Rica's distance from the capital in Guatemala, its legal prohibition under Spanish law against trading with its southern neighbors in Panama, then part of the Viceroyalty of New Granada (i.e., Colombia), and the lack of resources such as gold and silver, resulted in Costa Rica attracting few inhabitants. It was a poor, isolated, and sparsely inhabited region within the Spanish Empire. A Spanish governor in 1719 described Costa Rica as "the poorest and most miserable Spanish colony in all America."

Many historians say that the area suffered a lack of indigenous population available for forced labor, which meant that most of the Costa Rican settlers had to work their own land. This prevented the establishment of large haciendas. For all these reasons Costa Rica was by and large unappreciated and overlooked by the Spanish Crown and left to develop on its own. The small landowners' relative poverty, the lack of a large indigenous labor force, the population's ethnic and linguistic homogeneity, and Costa Rica's isolation from the Spanish colonial centers in Mexico and the Andes, all contributed to the development of an autonomous and individualistic agrarian society. Even the Governor had to farm his own crops and tend to his own garden due to his poverty. The failure to build a colonial society based on indigenous and slave labor led to a peasant economy in the 1700s.

During the time of conquest, as many as twenty distinct indigenous societies, numbering in the hundreds of thousands and speaking many different languages, inhabited the area. The Spanish conquest of Costa Rica lasted more than half a century after it started 1510. The genocidal enslavement of the indigenous societies of Nicoya on the Pacific North coast was the conquest's first stage. Its second phase began with fruitless attempts to consolidate a Spanish settlement on the country's Caribbean side. In the process, Spaniards reduced the indigenous population to the point of extinction through disease, war, reprisals, relocation and brutal exploitation. The Native American population stood at about 120,000 in 1569 and had fallen to 10,000 by 1611.

== Independence from Spain ==
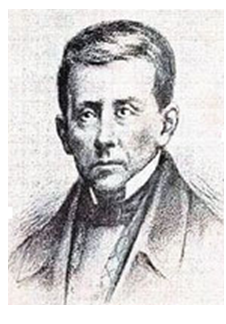
Gregorio José Ramírez was the most notable political chief of the province of Costa Rica, leading republican forces victorious in the Battle of Ochomogo.

In the early 19th century, Napoleon's occupation of Spain led to the outbreak of revolts all across Spanish America. In New Spain, all of the fighting by those seeking independence was done in the center of that area from 1810 to 1821, what today is central Mexico. Once the Viceroy was defeated in the capital city—today Mexico City—in 1821, the news of independence was sent to all the territories of New Spain, including the Intendencies of the former Captaincy General of Guatemala. Costa Rica joined the other Central American Intendancies in a joint declaration of independence from Spain, the 1821 Act of Independence.

On October 13, 1821, the documents arrived at Cartago, and an emergency meeting was called upon by Governor Juan Manuel de Cañas. There were many ideas on what to do upon gaining independence, such as joining Mexico, joining Guatemala or Nueva Granada (today Colombia). A group was declared (Junta de Legados), which created the temporary Junta Superior Gubernativa de Costa Rica while, "the clouds clear up" ("Mientras se aclaraban los nublados del día"), was a famous phrase of the events of the day.

Independence from Spain was acknowledged and ratified on October 29, 1821, by the colonial authorities. It was then ratified in the cities of San José on November 1, 1821, at Cartago on November 3, 1821, at Heredia on November 11, 1821, and Alajuela on November 25, 1821.

After the declaration of independence, the New Spain parliament intended to establish a commonwealth whereby the King of Spain, Ferdinand VII, would also be Emperor of New Spain, but in which both countries were to be governed by separate laws and with their own legislative offices. Should the king refuse the position, the law provided for a member of the House of Bourbon to accede to the New Spain throne. Ferdinand VII did not recognize the colony's independence and said that Spain would not allow any other European prince to take the throne of New Spain.

By request of Parliament, the president of the regency, Agustín de Iturbide, was proclaimed emperor of New Spain, which was renamed Mexico. The Mexican Empire was the official name given to this monarchical regime from 1821 to 1823. The territory of the Mexican Empire included the continental intendancies and provinces of New Spain proper (including those of the former Captaincy General of Guatemala) (See: Central America under Mexican rule). On 5 April 1823 the Battle of Ochomogo was fought between imperialist forces from Cartago led by Joaquín de Oreamuno who wanted to join the Mexican Empire and republican forces led by Gregorio José Ramírez who preferred to remain independent. The Republicans won and the capital was moved from Cartago to San José.

As early as then, Costa Ricans already had overseas impact since Costa Ricans were one of the Latin American nationalities that had soldiers and officers in the Philippines who supported their Emperor, Andrés Novales in his failed revolt against Spain.

== Central America ==
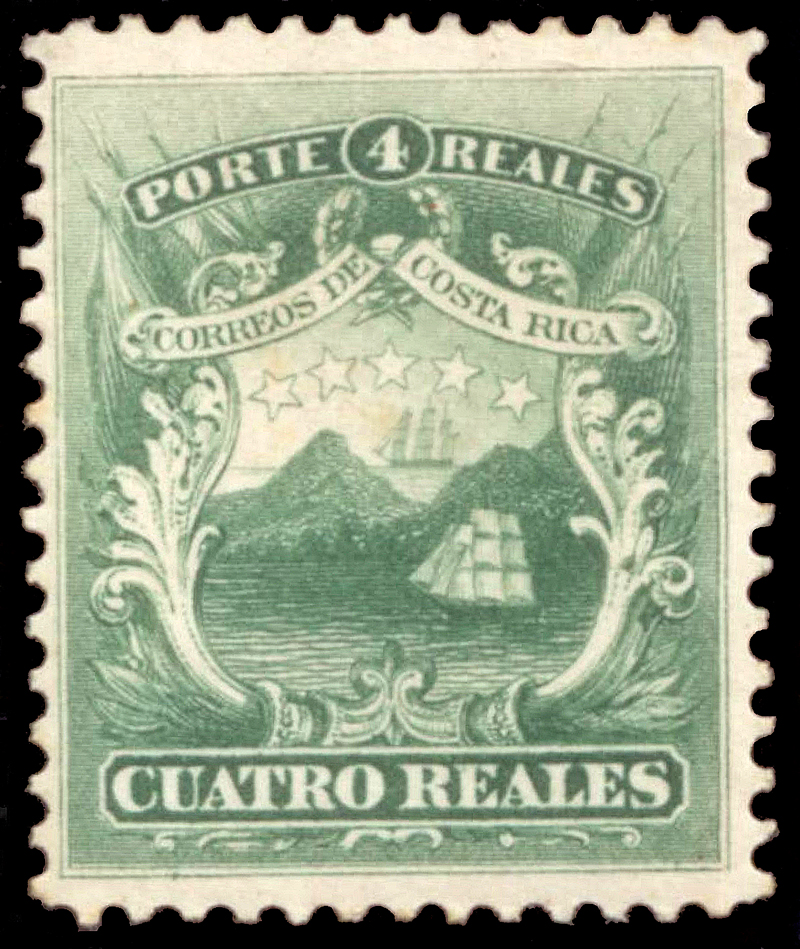
The 1849 national coat of arms was featured in the first postal stamp issued in 1862.

In 1823, a revolution in Mexico ousted Emperor Agustín de Iturbide. A new Mexican congress voted to allow the Central American Intendancies to decide their own fate. That year, the United Provinces of Central America was formed of the five Central American Intendancies under General Manuel José Arce. The Intendancies took the new name of States. The United Provinces federation, not strongly united to begin with, rapidly disintegrated under the pressures of intra-provincial rivalries.

Following its secession from the Federal Republic of Central America in 1838, Costa Rica had no regular trade routes established to export their coffee to European markets. Lack of infrastructure caused problems in transportation: the coffee-growing areas were mainly in the Central Valley and had access only to the port of Puntarenas on the Pacific coast. Before the Panama Canal opened, ships from Europe had to sail around Cape Horn in order to get to the Pacific Coast. In 1843, the country established a trade route to Europe with the help of William Le Lacheur, a Guernsey merchant and shipowner.

In 1856, William Walker, an American filibuster, began incursions into Central America. After landing in Nicaragua, he proclaimed himself as president of Nicaragua and re-instated slavery, which had been abolished. He intended to expand into Costa Rica and after he entered that territory, the country declared war against his forces.The campaign required an unusually extensive mobilization of Costa Rican society: about 10,000 men, roughly ten percent of the country's population, were levied, while the government imposed an exceptional war tax on coffee growers. Led by Commander in Chief of the Army of Costa Rica, President Juan Rafael Mora Porras, the filibusters were defeated and forced out of the country. Costa Rican forces followed the filibusters into Rivas, Nicaragua, where in a final battle, William Walker and his forces were finally pushed back. In this final battle, Juan Santamaría, a drummer boy from Alajuela, lost his life torching the filibusters' stronghold. He is today remembered as a national hero.

== Republic ==
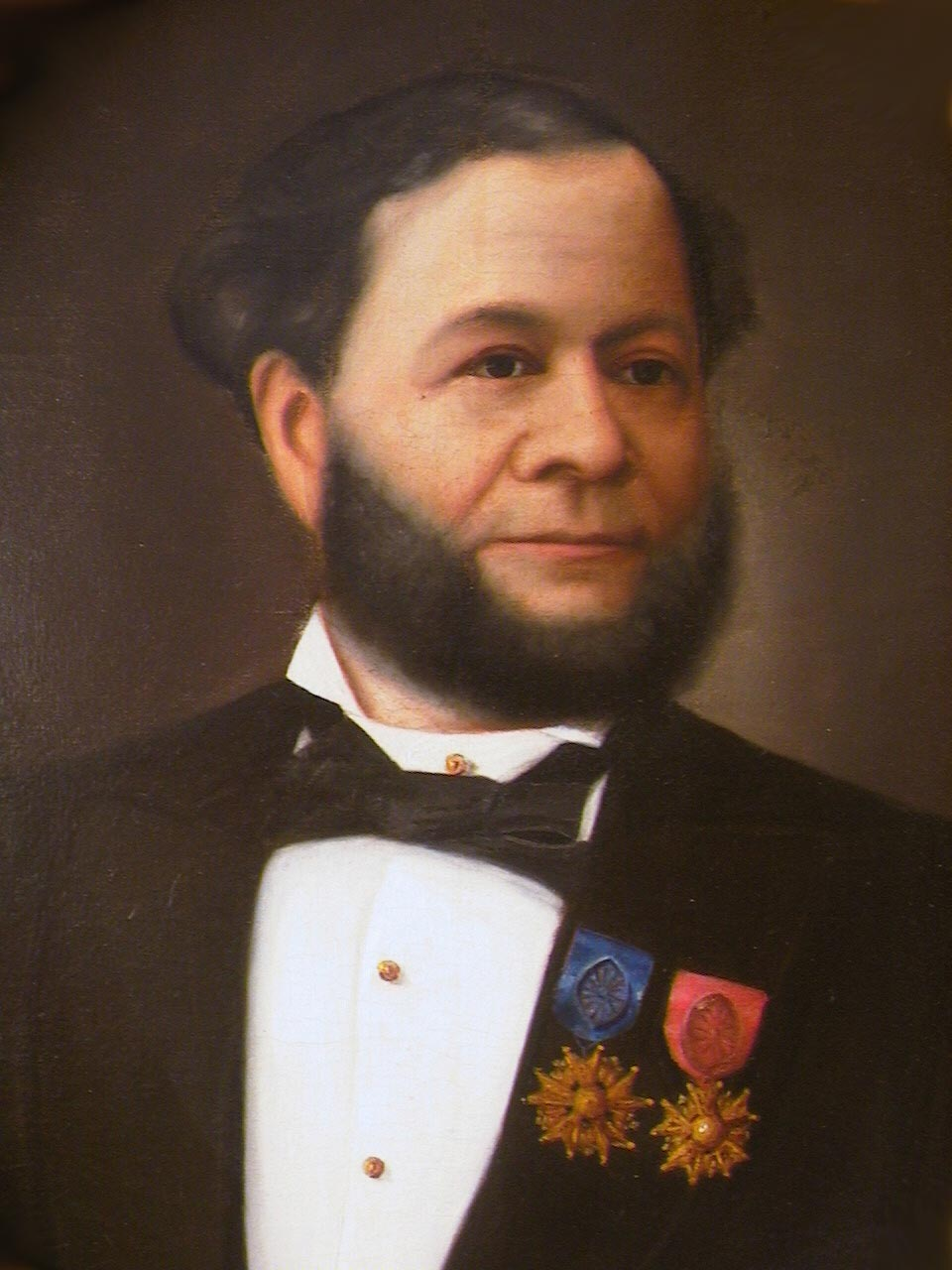
José María Castro Madriz formally declared Costa Rica as independent from the Federal Republic of Central America in 1848.

An era of peaceful democracy in Costa Rica began in 1869 with elections. Costa Rica has avoided much of the violence that has plagued Central America. Since the late nineteenth century, only two brief periods of violence have marred its republican development. In 1917–19, Federico Tinoco Granados ruled as a dictator.

In 1948, José Figueres Ferrer led an armed uprising following a disputed presidential election, culminating in the 44-day Costa Rican Civil War, the bloodiest conflict in the country’s twentieth-century history, with more than 2,000 fatalities. The victorious revolutionary junta subsequently undertook a sweeping reorganization of the Costa Rican state, drafting a new constitution that guaranteed universal suffrage, strengthened civil liberties, and—most consequentially—abolished the standing military. This decision marked a sharp institutional departure from prevailing regional patterns and redirected state resources toward civilian governance, education, and social development, fundamentally reshaping Costa Rica’s political trajectory. Figueres emerged as a central figure of the postwar settlement and was elected president in 1953 under the new constitutional framework. In the decades that followed, Costa Rica consolidated a stable system of civilian rule without a standing army, sustaining uninterrupted electoral governance and avoiding the cycles of military intervention that characterized much of Central America during the Cold War period.

Costa Rica's economy went under a transformation in 1978. The country went from being "an economic development success story" to entering a severe socio-economic crisis. Costa Rica relied on the exportation of bananas and coffee. In 1978, coffee prices dropped, and its revenues declined. In 1979, the price of oil, a main imported item, increased sharply and rapidly, plunging the country into crisis. In order to help improve the economy, President Rodrigo Carazo continued to borrow money internationally. This led the country into further debt.

Once a largely agricultural country, Costa Rica has transformed to relying on technology industry and services, and eco-tourism. Costa Rica's major source of export income is technology-based. Microsoft, Motorola, Intel and other technology-related firms have established operations in Costa Rica. Local companies create and export software as well as other computer-related products. Tourism is growing at an accelerated pace, and many believe that income from this tourism may soon become the major contributor to the nation's GDP. Traditional agriculture, particularly coffee and bananas, continues to be an important part of Costa Rica's exports.

During the period c.1864-1900, José María Figueroa Oreamuno Album and Notebooks record details of about Costa Rican current events, politics and ethnography amongst other topics.

== See also ==
- José Antonio Lacayo de Briones y Palacios
- List of presidents of Costa Rica
- Politics of Costa Rica
- Mining in Costa Rica
- José María Figueroa Oreamuno

General:

- History of Central America
- Spanish colonization of the Americas
