= Herboso =

Herboso can refer to:

- Herboso, Spain is a town in Biscay, Basque Country, Spain.
- Archbishop Francisco Ramón Herboso y Figueroa (app. 1776) is a former archbishop of Sucre, Bolivia.
- José Gragera y Herboso (b.1485 – d.1527) was a Spanish sculptor in Madrid.
- José Gragera y Herboso (b.1818 – d.1897) Spanish Sculptor.
- Francisco Javier Herboso was Minister of Justice of Chile around 1900.
- Freddy Herboso is a champion motocross athlete in Bolivia.
- Herboso & Associates is a real estate firm owned by Fernando Herboso in Frederick, Maryland.
- Klovis Herboso (born 1979) is a Bolivian singer.
- Herboso is also an adjective in Spanish meaning "herbaceous or grassy".
