= Higueras (surname) =

Higueras is a Spanish surname. It was first recorded in Galicia, the northwestern region of Spain. Although its etymology is uncertain, it is thought to be a variation of the Galician surname Figueroa.

Notable people with the surname are as follows:

- Antón Higueras de Santana (1557–1619), Spanish captain
- Fernando Higueras (1930–2008), Spanish architect
- Hugo Higueras (1910–date of death unknown), Peruvian fencer
- José Higueras (born 1953), Spanish tennis player and coach
- Marta Higueras (born 1964), Spanish jurist and politician
- Pablo Higueras (born 1967), Swiss football player

== See also ==
- Figueroa
- Figueras (surname)
