= FC Gland =

Swiss football club

- Full name: Football Club de Gland
- Nickname(s): L'etoile sportive (Sporting star)
- Founded: October 1920
- Ground: Centre sportif En Bord (Sporting Center En Bord)
- Chairman: Oga Venkat
- Head Coach: Pablo Higueras
- League: ACVF
- 2007–08: 1st, Championat 3e ligue, promotion 2e ligue
Home colours	Away colours

FC Gland, formerly Etoile FC Gland (etoile is the French word for star), or l'Etoile Sportive (French for Sporting star) is a Swiss sports club located in Gland. The club is best known for its football team.

They currently play in the sixth level of the Swiss Football League, in the Association Cantonale Vaudoise de Football (ACVF).

== History ==
=== Early years: 1920 to 1933 ===
The club was formed in October 1920 by a group of eleven young sportsmen – Alfred Blonay, Jean Bottin, Charles Caboussat, Maurice Heimberg, Haeberli, Albert Jonzier, Charles Mosetti, Daniel Mosetti, Emile Mosetti, and Jules Muston. The club was known as L'Etoile sportive FC and Alfred Blonay was president. Their first match was a friendly against a local club which they lost 3–1.

Between 1921 and 1925 the club finished first in the Championat du Léman (Regional League), and one season, were undefeated during the whole season. After a couple of years of inactivity, in 1933 the clubs changed name to FC Gland.

==== 1936 to 1953 ====
A key event in the club's history came in 1936 with the arrival of the Rih's brothers. Once again, they were champions of the Regional Championship with a 7–0 victory against Malley II. They were regional champions again in the 1937–38 season and promoted to the Upper III league. The following season they were then promoted to the Second League. In 1939, the club won the Third League 's Roman Champion Cup, beating Malley 3–2.

From 1939 to 1944 they played in the Second League. However, in 1944 they were relegated to the Fourth league for financial reasons. The following season they were promoted back up to the Third league. In 1947, they were promoted to the Second league again, before being relegated to the Third league in 1953.

=== 1953 to present ===
The club continued to be promoted and relegated between the Third league and Second league. In the 1978–79 season, for the first time in its history the club played a promotion game for the First League, the third tier in the league in Switzerland. They lost 1–2 to Guin. A second chance arose in 1982, however they lost again, this time in a penalty shootout.

In 1981, in order to comply with the gender equality standards, the FC Gland girls team was formed with the combined efforts of the president Lecoultre and the FC Gland community.

The club played twice more in promotion games, in 1983 and 1987. Yet again though they lost both matches. Then in 1996, they had another chance to be promoted to the First League. This time the opportunity was seized. And coached by Arpad Soos, they finally won promotion for the first time to the First League. Their stay in the First League though was short-lived as the following season they finished next to bottom and were relegated to the Second League.

In the following years, the club remained constant in its results and a reserve team was formed and also a junior section.

== Centre sportif En Bord ==
Centre Sportif En Bord is the home of FC Gland. The site has football pitches and tennis courts. Two of the pitches are grass and one is astroturf (fake grass). There are many outdoor tennis courts and also some indoor ones as well. There is a café near to the Tennis hall and a Buvette next to the football changing rooms. The site is located in Gland near the Gland train station.

== Honours ==
=== League ===
- Ranked first in the Championnat du Leman: 1922
- Second League Group champions: 1979, 1997, 2000
- Third League Group champions: 1939, 1946, 1950, 1960, 1978, 1983, 1987, 1989, 2008
- Fourth League Group champions: 1938, 1945, 1970
- Canton Vaud (Seniors) champions: 2007

=== Cup ===
- Roman Champion Cup winners: 1939
- Canton de Vaud Cup winners (Seniors): 2008
- Canton de Vaud Cup winners: 2018
