= Árpád Soós =

Árpád Soós may refer to:

- Árpád Soós (zoologist)
- Árpád Soós (footballer)
