= Higueras (disambiguation) =

Higueras is a municipality in Castellón Province, Valencian Community, Spain. It may also refer to:

- Higueras, Nuevo León, municipality in Mexico
- Higueras (surname), list of people with the surname
- Estadio Las Higueras, football stadium in Talcahuano, Chile
- Las Higueras Airport, airport in Argentina.
