= Betz mystery sphere =

Metal sphere found in 1974 in Florida, United States

External videos
- Man Finds Sphere...WFAA Reports, April 24, 1974

Terry Betz and the sphere in 1974

The Betz mystery sphere is a metal sphere with an approximate diameter of 8 inches (20 cm) weighing nearly 22 pounds (10 kg) found in 1974 by a family in Florida. (Note: Exact dimensions, attributed by Brian Dunning to measurements taken by the United States Navy, were a diameter of 7.96 inches (20.2 cm) and a weight of 21.34 pounds (9.68 kg). The sphere was also determined to be hollow, with its shell approximately 1/2 inch (1.3 cm) thick.) It was subsequently examined by the U. S. Navy, who determined it was a common ball bearing of the type used in an industrial check valve.

== History ==
According to Antoine, Jerri, and Terry Betz, on March 27, 1974 they were driving through the site of a small brush fire near their residence on Fort George Island, Florida when they came across a small metal sphere the size of a bowling ball. According to the Betz's, they thought the sphere might have been a cannonball left from New World conquistadors and took it back to their house.

Terry Betz claimed the sphere had various extraordinary properties, such as reacting to the sound of his guitar playing, moving on its own or after being shaken, starting, stopping, and changing direction while rolling on the floor, and following people around the house.

=== Press coverage ===
A local Jacksonville newspaper reporter visited the Betz home and wrote that the sphere seemed to move by itself, prompting what has been described as "a media frenzy". In April 1974, Mrs. Betz requested The United States Navy examine the sphere to determine if it was lost Navy property. The Navy responded that the sphere was "nothing more than a huge ball bearing used as a check valve in the piping system of some chemical plant". The same month, the Miami Herald reported that a similar ball in Jacksonville (near Fort George Island) had been identified as "part of a valve once used in a paper mill". In June 1974, the sphere was examined by UFOlogist J. Allen Hynek and a group of scientists attending a conference sponsored by the National Enquirer, which at the time was offering a cash reward for any object proven to have come from outer space. The group felt "the object was constructed of some type of stainless steel made on earth."

=== Analysis ===
According to skeptical author Brian Dunning, his research showed the sphere "sat quietly on display inside the Betz home for nearly two weeks, and is not reported to have ever moved on its own at all, except for when someone took it down to experiment with it". Dunning cites a U.S. Navy investigator who discounted stories of the sphere's claimed extraordinary autonomous movement, saying, "I believe it's because of the construction of the house... It's old and has uneven stone floors. The ball is almost perfectly balanced, and it takes just a little indentation to make it move or change direction."

Dunning wrote that the sphere's size, weight, and metallurgical composition matched those of a common ball check valve, and concluded the ball's origin was likely New Mexico artist James Durling-Jones, who had been collecting scrap metal for use in sculptures and reported having loaded ball check valves into the rooftop luggage rack of his Volkswagen Bus, and then "(driven) through the Jacksonville area around Easter of 1971, at which time a few of the balls rolled off the luggage rack and were lost."

== See also ==
- Gravity hill – Illusion in which objects appear to roll uphill
- Klerksdorp sphere – Natural nodule-like rock concretions
- Stone spheres of Costa Rica – National symbol of Costa Rica
