= Francisco Figueroa =

Francisco Figueroa may refer to:

- Francisco Figueroa (water polo) (1906–2001), Uruguayan water polo player
- Francisco Figueroa (boxer) (born 1978), Puerto Rican boxer
- Francisco Figueroa (politician) (born 1986), Chilean politician and journalist
- Francisco Antonio Figueroa (born 1999), known as Tony Figueroa, Mexican footballer

== See also ==
- Francisco de Figueroa (disambiguation)
