= Klerksdorp sphere =

Natural nodule-like rock concretions

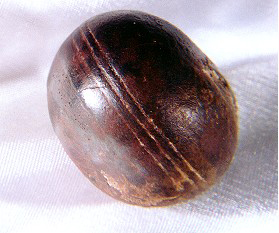
A Klerksdorp sphere. It is 3 to 4 centimetres (1.2 to 1.6 in) in maximum diameter and 2.5 centimetres (0.98 in) in thickness.

Klerksdorp spheres are small objects, often spherical to disc-shaped, that have been collected by miners and rockhounds from 3-billion-year-old pyrophyllite deposits mined by Wonderstone Ltd., near Ottosdal, South Africa. They have been cited by pseudoscientists and reporters in books, popular articles, and many web pages as inexplicable out-of-place artifacts that could only have been manufactured by intelligent beings. Geologists who have studied these objects have concluded that the objects are not manufactured, but are rather the result of natural processes.

== Description ==
The Klerksdorp spheres typically range in diameter from 0.5 to 10 cm (0.20 to 3.94 in). As illustrated by geologist Paul Heinrich, they vary widely in shape from either approximate or flattened spheres to well-defined discs and often are intergrown. Petrographic and X-ray diffraction analyses of specimens of these objects found that they consist either of hematite (Fe_{2}O_{3}) or wollastonite (CaSiO_{3}) mixed with minor amounts of hematite and goethite (FeOOH). The color of the specimens studied by Paul Heinrich ranged from dark reddish brown, red, to dusky red. All of the specimens of these objects, which were cut open by Heinrich, exhibited an extremely well-defined radial structure terminating in either the center or centers of a Klerksdorp sphere. Some of these objects exhibit well-defined and parallel latitudinal grooves or ridges. Even specimens consisting of intergrown flattened spheres exhibit such grooves.

Observations by Bruce Cairncross, Louis Taylor Nel, and Andrea Agangi demonstrate that the unoxidized and unaltered Klerksdorp spheres found in pristine pyrophyllite consist of diagenetic pyrite (FeS_{2}). These objects exhibit a metallic luster and pale brass-yellow color. In cross-section, they exhibit a well-defined radial structure terminating on either in the center or centers. Pyrite occurs abundantly as finely disseminated grains, cm-size spheroids (Klerksdorp spheres), and layers at multiple horizons within thin beds of carbonaceous shale or slate, which is locally called wonderstone.

== Geologic setting ==
Klerksdorp spheres are found in carbonaceous shales (wonderstone) that occur as lenses within the 1.5 km (0.93 mi) thick Syferfontein Formation. It is composed of feldspar-quartz-phyric felsic volcanic rocks, basaltic to andesitic lava, tuff and breccia and is part of the 2.7 km (1.7 mi) thick Mesoarchaean Dominion Group. The Dominion Group fills failed rift basins within the Kaapvaal craton in modern South Africa. A terrestrial setting for the accumulation of the Dominion Group is demonstrated by the type of volcanic facies, e.g. massive amygdaloidal lavas lacking pillow structures, presence of high-temperature, subaerial ignimbrites, and palaeosols found within it.

The Klerksdorp sphere-bearing carbonaceous lacustrine shales occur as thin, tens of meters thick, discontinuous layers interbedded with felsic volcanic rock of the Syferfontein Formation. The shales are composed of thickly bedded, but largely massive shale intercalated with beds of lithic arenite. The grey to black color of the shales and arenite is indicative of variable carbon content. Locally, the shales is mined as wonderstone for its high pyrophyllite content. The abundant carbonaceous matter in these shales provide evidence for biologic production in a volcanically dominated terrestrial acid lake environment about 3.0 Ga ago. Typically, these shales lie upon a 3–6 m (9.8–19.7 ft) thick bed of organic carbon-poor sandstone that separates them from the underlying volcanic rocks. This basal sandstone often exhibits trough-cross bedding and ripple laminations. It consists of coarse-grained pebbly sandstone at the base which fines upwards to medium-grained sandstone. Over an interval of about 1 m (3.3 ft), the basal sandstone becomes carbonaceous and grades upward into carbonaceous shale. Locally, a discoloration of the shale close to the surface, suggests that long-term, weathering has altered these rocks.

== Geological explanation of their origin ==
Various professional geologists agree that the Klerksdorp spheres originated as concretions, which formed in volcanic sediments after they accumulated 3 billion years ago. Heinrich argues that the wollastonite nodules formed by the metamorphism of carbonate concretions in the presence of silica-rich fluids generated during the metamorphism of the volcanic deposits containing them into pyrophyllite. It was also argued that the hematite nodules represent pyrite concretions oxidized by weathering of near surface pyrophyllite deposits. Below the near-surface zone of weathering, which has developed in the pyrophyllite, pyrite concretions are unaffected by weathering and, thus, have not been altered to hematite. The radial internal structure of these objects is a pseudomorph after the original crystalline structure of the original carbonate or pyrite concretion.

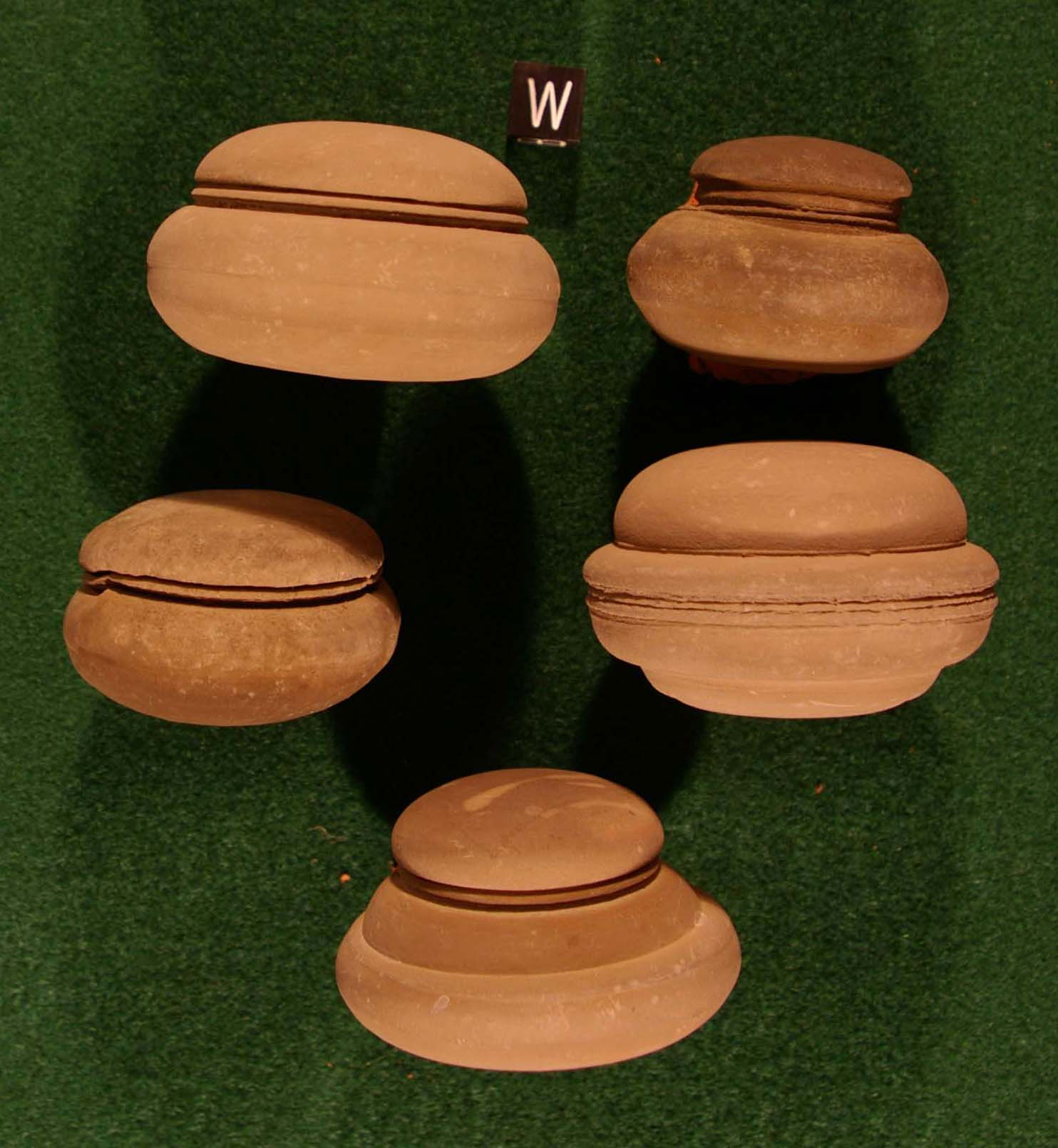
Side view of typical calcareous concretions, which exhibit equatorial grooves, found in Schoharie County, New York. The cube, for scale, is one centimeter cubed.

Both Cairncross and Heinrich argue that the grooves exhibited by these concretions are natural in origin. As proposed by Cairncross, the grooves represent fine-grained laminations within which the concretions grew. The growth of the concretions within the plane of the finer-grained laminations was inhibited because of the lesser permeability and porosity of finer-grained sediments relative to the surrounding sediments. Faint internal lamina, which corresponds to exterior groove, can be seen in cut specimens. A similar process in coarser-grained sediments created the latitudinal ridges and grooves exhibited by innumerable iron oxide concretions found within the Navajo Sandstone of southern Utah called "Moqui marbles". Latitudinal grooves are also found on carbonate concretions found in Schoharie County, New York. The latitudinal ridges and grooves of the Moqui marbles are more pronounced and irregular than seen in the Klerksdorp (Ottosdal) concretions because they formed in sand that was more permeable than the fine-grained volcanic material in which the Klerksdorp (Ottosdal) concretions grew.

Very similar concretions have been found within strata, as old as 2.7 to 2.8 billion years, comprising part of the Hamersley Group of Australia. The Australian concretions and the Klerksdorp spheres are among the oldest known examples of concretions created by microbial activity during the diagenesis of sediments.

== Criticism of "out of place" claims ==
Various claims have been made that these objects are either "perfectly round" or perfect spheres. These claims are now known to be incorrect as directly observed by Heinrich. The specimens vary widely in shape, from noticeably flattened spheres to distinct disks. As illustrated by Heinrich, some of the Klerksdorp spheres are interlocked with each other, like a mass of soap bubbles. The observations and figure refute claims that these objects are either always spherical or isolated in their occurrence. Heinrich argues that even grooved spheres are not perfect spheres and some consist of interlocked spheres.

Similarly, the claims that these objects consist of metal, e.g. "a nickel-steel alloy which does not occur naturally" according to Jochmans, are contradicted by Cairncross and Heinrich. The fact that many of the web pages that make this claim also incorrectly identify the pyrophyllite quarries, from which these objects came, as the "Wonderstone Silver Mine" is evidence that these authors have not verified the validity of, in this case, misinformation taken from other sources since these quarries are neither known as silver mines nor has silver ever been mined in them in the decades in which they have been in operation.

Heinrich notes that one of Michael Cremo's sources regarding the allegedly anomalous spheres was the Weekly World News, a satirical tabloid, which he described as an "unreliable source of data for discussing the origins of the South African spheres described as used by Forbidden Archeology". According to Cairncross, it appears that the source of the Weekly World News article is an earlier article by Barritt. This article appeared in a 1982 issue of Scope magazine about these objects. Additionally, Roelf Marx, as quoted in Cairncross and Pope and Cairncross, former curator of the Klerksdorp Museum, reports that he was misquoted regarding these objects. Marx was quoted in popular articles as saying that the objects rotated by themselves in vibration-free display cases in the Klerksdorp Museum. Instead, Marx stated that they rotated because of the numerous earth tremors generated by underground blasting in local gold mining. Similarly, inquiries of scientists, who studied these objects, have found that the claims that NASA found these objects to be either perfectly balanced, unnatural, or puzzling are unsubstantiated.

Published descriptions of these spheres being harder than steel are definitively false in terms of Mohs scale of mineral hardness. Steel can vary from 4 to 8 on the Mohs scale, depending on the type of alloy, heat treatment, and whether it is case-hardened or not. An examination of several Klerksdorp spheres found none to be harder than 5.0 on the Mohs scale. For comparison, common glass has a Mohs hardness of 5.5.

== See also ==
- Betz mystery sphere – Metal sphere found in 1974 in Florida, United States
- Geofact – Portmanteau of geology and artifact
- Stone spheres of Costa Rica – National symbol of Costa Rica
