= Árpád Soós (footballer) =

Swiss football manager (born 1962)

Personal information
- Date of birth: 20 April 1962 (age 64)
- Place of birth: Switzerland

Managerial career
- Years: Team
- 1995–1997: FC Gland
- 2007–2009: FC Stade Nyonnais
- 2010: FC Lausanne-Sport
- 2012: Servette FC (director of sports)

Árpád Soós (born 20 April 1962) is a Swiss football manager.

He coached FC Gland from 1995 to 1997.

In 2010, he became manager of FC Stade Nyonnais. Lausanne-Sport only played in the second highest league, the 2009–10 Swiss Challenge League, but struggled and John Dragani was sacked. Soós was only tied to the club by a handshake contract, lasting until 15 May 2010. Lausanne-Sport was ultimately led by Soós to the 2009–10 Swiss Cup final. Though they lost greatly, 6–0 to Basel, the berth in the final earned Lausanne-Sport a ticket to the 2010–11 Europa League second qualifying round. From there, the team progressed to the 2010–11 UEFA Europa League group stage.

Three days after the cup final, the news emerged that Soós would no longer manage Lausanne-Sport. He served as director of sports in Servette FC in 2012. Servette had been in turmoil in 2011–12, when João Alves was fired as manager in the fall; however, with a change of club president, the manager who replaced Alves was shown the door alongside director of sports Costinha, allowing Soós to replace Costinha.
