= Carlos Figueroa =

Carlos Figueroa may refer to:

- Carlos Figueroa (footballer) (born 1980), Guatemalan footballer
- Carlos Figueroa (equestrian) (1931–2012), Spanish equestrian
- Carlos Figueroa (judoka) (born 1985), Salvadoran judoka
- Carlos Mata Figueroa, Venezuelan general and politician
- Carlos Zúñiga Figueroa (1885–1964), Honduran painter
