= Trini de Figueroa =

Spanish writer (1918–1972)

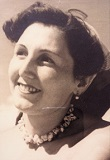
- Born: Trinidad de Figueroa y Gómez; 17 May 1918; Valencia, Spain
- Died: 7 January 1972 (aged 53); Ibiza, Spain
- Occupation: romance novelist
- Spouse: Leopoldo Baldomero Botella y Gómez de Luzón
- Writing career
- Genre: romance novels

Trini de Figueroa (1918–1972) was a popular Spanish writer from the Valencian Community of more than 125 romance novels since 1946. She was translated into Portuguese, French and English.

== Biography ==
Trinidad de Figueroa y Gómez was born on 17 May 1918 in Valencia, Spain, the daughter of Marcos de Figueroa and Trinidad Gómez y Padilla, both Andalusians. An exceptional student, she studied Higher Baccalaureate at the Provincial Institute of Valencia (now, Instituto Lluís Vives). She received her B.A. degree in 1936, having finished with Honors in the State Examination, after a record full of honors. She married Leopoldo Baldomero Botella y Gómez de Luzón with whom she started a family. She began publishing romantic novels in 1946, encouraged by her former literature teacher, who at that time was publishing for Editorial Pueyo using a pseudonym. In addition to the Pueyo publishing house, her novels were published by Bruguera, Rollán and Editorial Andina. She lived in Ibiza until her death on Iberia Flight 602, which crashed on 7 January 1972 and killed all those on board.

== Selected works ==
- Amor y orgullo (1946)
- París a sus pies (1946)
- Rebeldía justificada (1946)
- ¡Han vuelto nuestros cadetes! (1947)
- ¡Nadie toque a esta mujer! (1947)
- Drama en el aula (1947)
- La locura de un rapto (1947)
- Por un préstamo una esposa -ó- Un extraño préstam (1947)
- Prometida por seis días (1947)
- Cadenas del corazón (1948)
- Cruel estigma (1948)
- Déjame adorarte, emperatriz (1948)
- El hechizo de una voz (1948)
- En guardia contra el amor (1948)
- Escándalo en la clínica (1948)
- La muchachita de Grenoch (1948)
- No quiero tu compasión (1948)
- Sahyli (1948)
- Su Majestad el Destino (1948)
- Torbellino de pasiones (1948)
- Una mentira apasionada (1948)
- A cambio de tres besos (1949)
- Como una esfinge… (1949)
- Dos páginas en blanco (1949)
- El alma cincelada (1949)
- El honor no se subasta (1949)
- Entre mar y cielo (1949)
- Juventud redimida (1949)
- Las dos bodas de Regina (1949)
- Mi vida por la suya (1949)
- ¡Si nunca volvieras...! (1950)
- Al declinar el sol (1950)
- Cobardía (1950)
- Con destino prestado (1950)
- Solo tú, Verónica (1950)
- Sortilegio (1950)
- Sublime esclavitud (1950)
- Talismán de corazón (1950)
- Viviré para ti (1950)
- Bendito silencio (1951)
- Cenicienta sueña (1951)
- Desde aquel beso... (1951)
- Encadenada (1951)
- La réplica de Sadie (1951)
- Quince margaritas (1951)
- Rompiendo el pasado (1951)
- Secreta tortura (1951)
- Castigo (1952)
- El otro rostro (1952)
- Frente al mar (1952)
- La bailarina de color (1952)
- Por la senda del honor (1952)
- Una sortija de rubíes (1952)
- Casada con una sombra (1953)
- Cátedra de honor (1953)
- Cenizas (1953)
- Día de exámenes (1953)
- Dos años de tregua (1953)
- El secreto de Ciceley Harlan -ó- El tesoro de Ciceley Harlan (1953)
- En un castillo normando (1953)
- Espejismo (1953)
- Estrellas de plata (1953)
- Las tres Bradison (1953)
- Paraíso en tres etapas (1953)
- Paréntesis de inquietud (1953)
- Sagrado mandato (1953)
- Thaswa (1953)
- Adoración (1954)
- Amanda (1954)
- Aquí está el cielo (1954)
- Calumnia (1954)
- Conflicto pasional (1954)
- No puedo perdonarte (1954)
- Renace un corazón (1954)
- Tu corazón y el mío (1954)
- Vuelven los cadetes (1954)
- Yo estoy contigo (1954)
- ¡Que nadie lo sepa! (1955)
- Atrás quedaba la vida (1955)
- Caminos de expiación (1955)
- El dominador (1955)
- Frente a la vida (1955)
- La Luna fue culpable (1955)
- Pasión en la nieve (1955)
- Tus ojos embrujan (1955)
- Un beso para empezar (1955)
- El castillo del silencio (1956)
- Escondida en el anónimo (1956)
- Ha nacido una mujer (1956)
- Hazel (1956)
- La sonrisa de porcelana (1956)
- Sígueme (1956)
- El escéptico soñador (1957)
- El secreto que se llevaron (1957)
- La chica de la vespa (1957)
- Maite querida (1957)
- No soy una pecadora (1957)
- Pelirroja (1957)
- Su último escándalo (1957)
- ¡Esos periódicos mienten! (1958)
- Condena irremediable (1958)
- Corazón obstinado (1958)
- La brisa trae amores (1958)
- Querido gigantón (1958)
- Sueño peligroso (1958)
- Tengo miedo (1958)
- Vuelo dramático (1958)
- El delito de callar (1959)
- El destino va a Paris (1959)
- Ella tenía un pasado (1959)
- Fiscal, te equivocaste (1959)
- ¡Redimida! (1960)
- Mi corazón se vende (1960)
- Habla el más allá (1961)
- El diablo azul (1962)
- El error de Evelyn (1962)
- Pecosa y rebelde (1962)
- Yasmina (1963)
- La gran lección (1964)
- Pasión en tres etapas (1964)
- Luz entre sombras (1965)
- Marcada (1965)
- Adiós, señor embajador... (1970)
- Demasiado bonita (1970)
- Guantes de terciopelo (1970)
- Un hombre sin ayer (1971)
- Treinta días de Gloria
