= Stone spheres of Costa Rica =

National symbol of Costa Rica

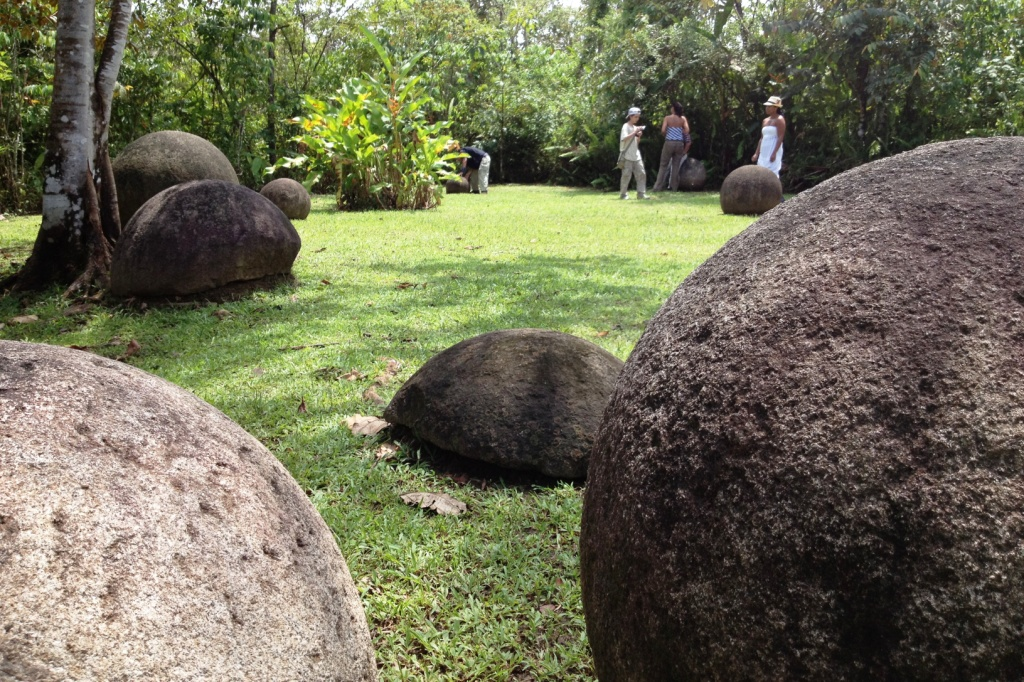
- Stone spheres of the Diquís at the Finca 6 archaeological site

- Location within Central America
- 8°54′41″N 83°28′39″W
- Periods: 500–1500 CE
- Cultures: Diquís culture
- Location: Palmar Sur, Osa, Puntarenas, Costa Rica
- Region: Osa, Puntarenas

UNESCO World Heritage Site
- Official name: Precolumbian chiefdom settlements with stone spheres of the Diquís
- Type: Cultural
- Criteria: iii
- Designated: 2014 (38th session)
- Reference no.: 1453
- Region: Latin America and the Caribbean

The stone spheres of Costa Rica are an assortment of over 300 petrospheres in Costa Rica, on the Diquís Delta and on Isla del Caño. Locally, they are also known as bolas de piedra (lit. 'stone balls'). The spheres are commonly attributed to the extinct Diquís culture, and they are sometimes referred to as the Diquís spheres. They are the best-known stone sculptures of the Isthmo-Colombian area.

They are thought to have been placed in lines along the approach to the houses of chiefs, but their exact significance remains uncertain.

The Palmar Sur Archaeological Excavations are a series of excavations of a site located in the southern portion of the country, known as the Diquís Delta, and have centered on a site known as "Finca 6" (Farm 6). The archaeological findings date back to the Aguas Buenas Period (300–800 CE) and Chiriquí Period (800–1550 CE).

In June 2014, the precolumbian Chiefdom settlements with stone spheres of the Diquís were added to the UNESCO list of World Heritage Sites. In July 2014, a project, which had been proposed in 2011, to declare the spheres a national symbol of the country was approved.

According to archaeologists' hypothesis, the spheres could represent solar systems or just be inspired by various stages of the sun and the moon as viewed with the naked eye, including setting or rising suns, and half moons.

== Description ==
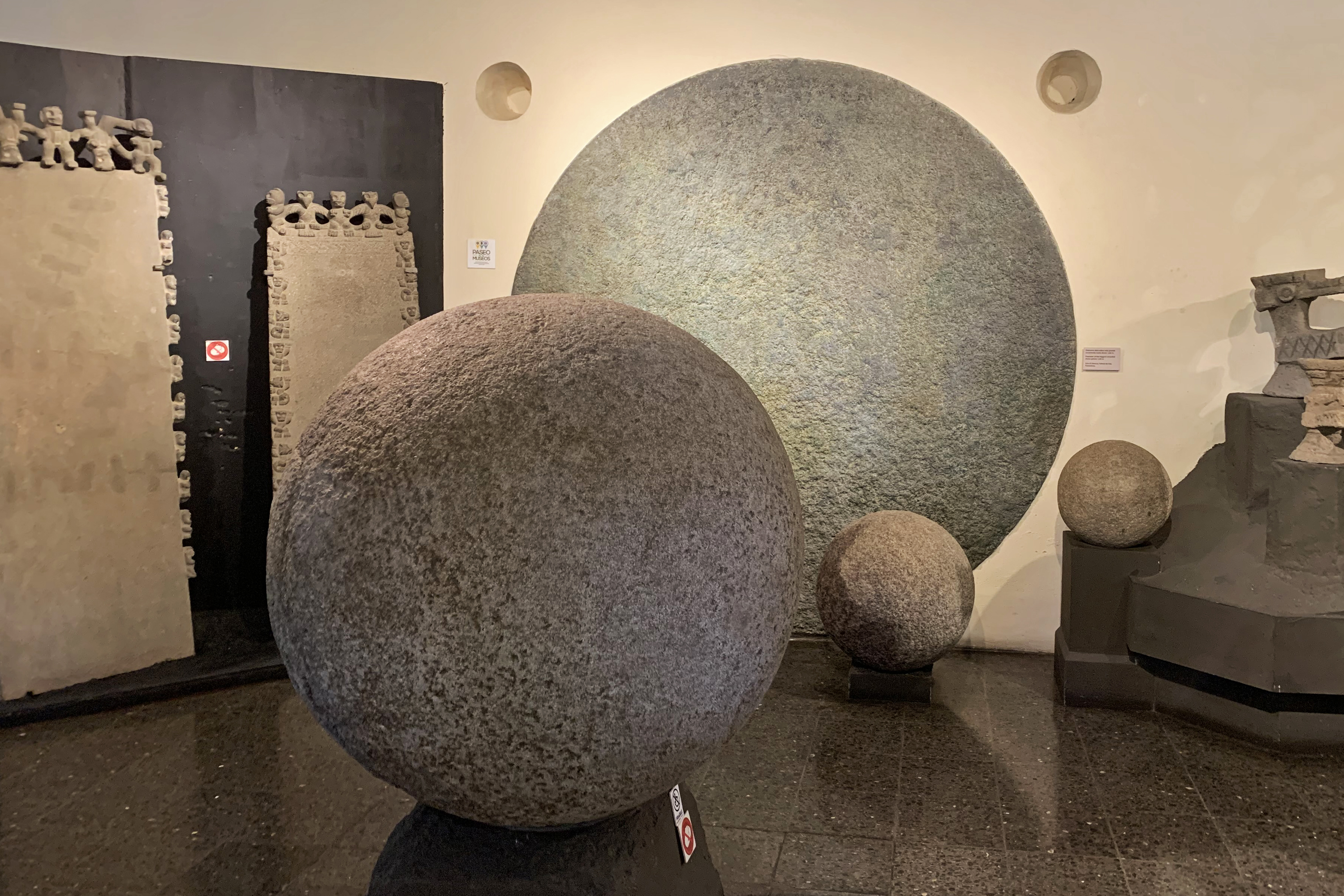
Several stone spheres of the Diquís exhibited at Museo Nacional de Costa Rica. For comparison purposes, the image on the wall shows the diameter of the biggest recorded stone sphere, 2.66 metres (8.7 ft)

The spheres range in size from a few centimetres to over 2 metres (6.6 ft) in diameter, and weigh up to 15 tons. Most are sculpted from gabbro, the coarse-grained equivalent of basalt. There are a dozen or so made from shell-rich limestone, and another dozen made from a sandstone.

They appear to have been made by hammering natural boulders with other rocks, then polishing with sand. The degree of finishing and precision of working varies considerably. The gabbro came from sites in the hills, several kilometres away from where the finished spheres are found, though some unfinished spheres remain in the hills.

== Geographic setting and location ==
The archaeological site of Palmar Sur is located in the southern portion of Costa Rica, known as the Diquís Delta, and in the southernmost part of the Puntarenas Province. The Diquís Delta is defined as the alluvial plain with the geographical boundaries of the Fila Grisera to the north and east, the Pacific Ocean to the west, and the Osa Mountains comprising the southern boundary.

The Site is located in Palmar Sur, southern Costa Rica. The site is located on approximately 10 hectares of property that was previously owned by the United Fruit Company in the alluvial plain of the Térraba River.

== Site description ==
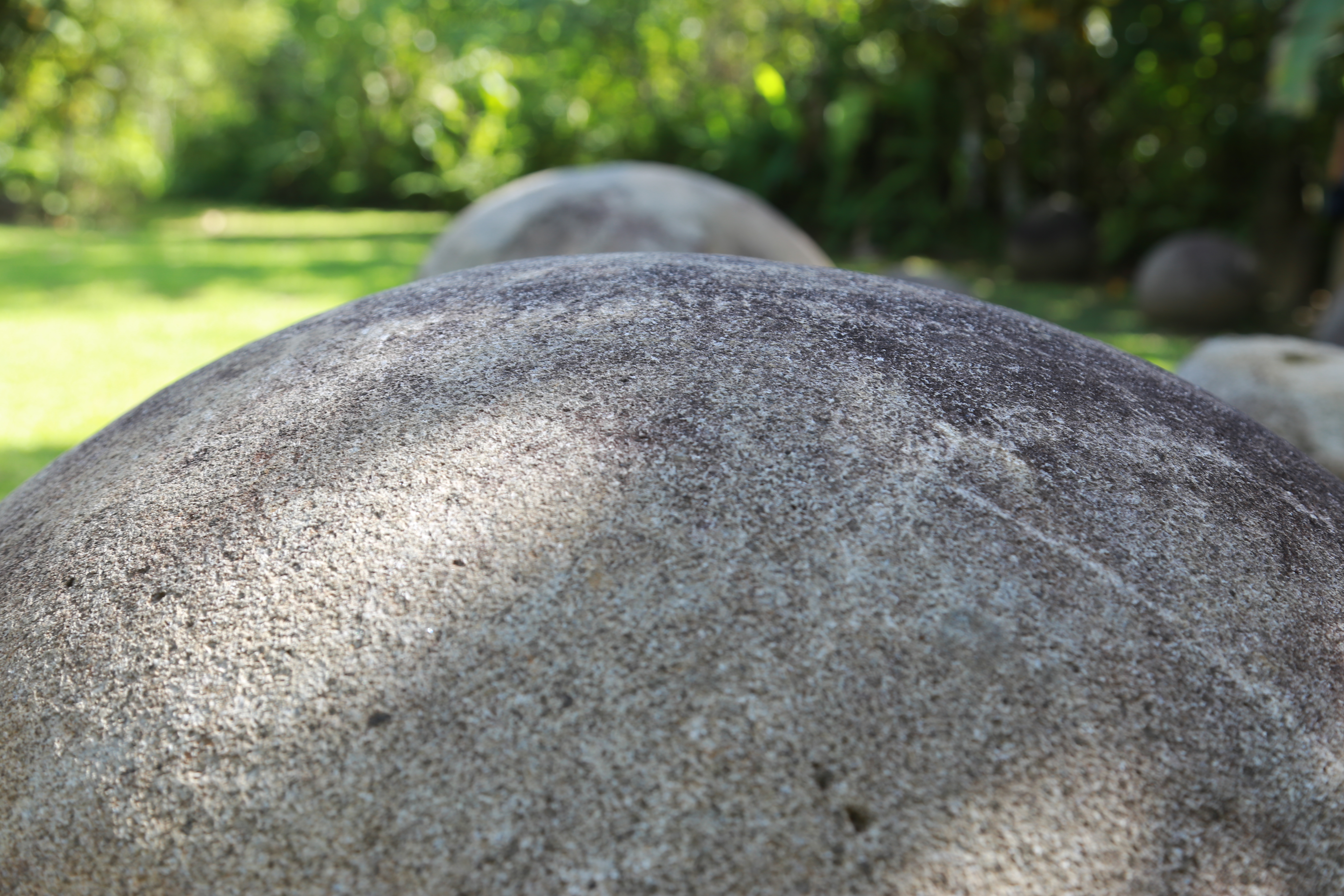
In situ stone sphere at Finca 6 Archaeological site

The archaeological site of Farm 6 has been dated to the Aguas Buenas Period (300–800 CE) and Chiriquí Period (800–1550 CE). It was a multifunctional site accommodating a settlement and a cemetery, and remains of monumental architecture and sculpture are also present on the site. The monumental architecture consists of two mounds which were constructed with retaining walls made of rounded river cobbles and filled with earth. The site contains multiple locations where large stone spheres are found in situ. Additionally, since many of the stone spheres in the region were removed from their original locations and serve as landscape decoration, the site has become a storage location for spheres that have been returned to the National Museum. One of the neighboring towns to Farm 6 also had spheres or "esferas". They were called "zanahoriagas", for their more oval, carrot-like shape.

== Pre-Columbian history ==
The stones are believed to have been first created around the year 600 CE, with most dating to after 1000, but before the Spanish conquest. However, their age remains unknown as the only method available for dating the carved stones is stratigraphy, but most stones are no longer in their original locations which confuses that. If the stones' estimated dating is accurate, then the culture of the people who made them disappeared after the Spanish conquest.

== Post-contact history ==
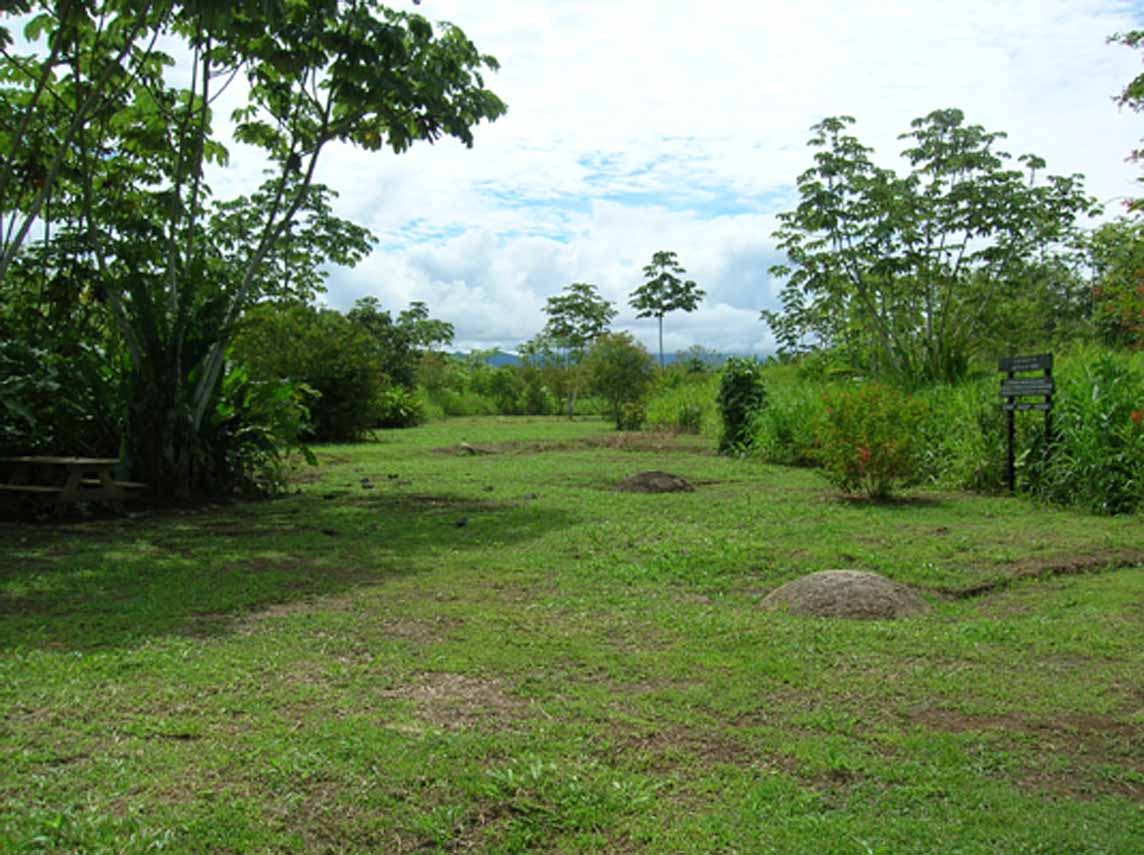
View of the Farm 6 Archaeological site.

The spheres were discovered in the 1930s as the United Fruit Company was clearing the jungle for banana plantations. Workmen pushed them aside with bulldozers and heavy equipment, damaging some spheres. Additionally, inspired by stories of hidden gold, workmen began to drill holes into the spheres and blow them open with sticks of dynamite. Several of the spheres were destroyed before authorities intervened. Some of the dynamited spheres have been reassembled and are currently on display at the National Museum of Costa Rica in San José. The collection at the National Museum of Costa Rica is made up of six of the spheres. Many spheres also ended up as lawn decorations for many Tico citizens.

The first scientific investigation of the spheres was undertaken shortly after their discovery by Doris Stone, a daughter of a United Fruit executive. These were published in 1943 in American Antiquity, attracting the attention of Samuel Kirkland Lothrop of the Peabody Museum at Harvard University. In 1948, he and his wife attempted to excavate an unrelated archaeological site in the northern region of Costa Rica. In San José he met Doris Stone, who directed the group toward the Diquís Delta region in the southwest ("Valle de Diquís" refers to the valley of the lower Río Grande de Térraba, including the Osa Canton towns of Puerto Cortés, Palmar Norte, and Sierpe) and provided them with valuable dig sites and personal contacts. Lothrop's findings were published in Archaeology of the Diquís Delta, Costa Rica 1963.

In 2010, University of Kansas researcher John Hoopes visited the site of the Stone Spheres to evaluate their eligibility for protection as a Unesco World Heritage Site.

== Historical background ==
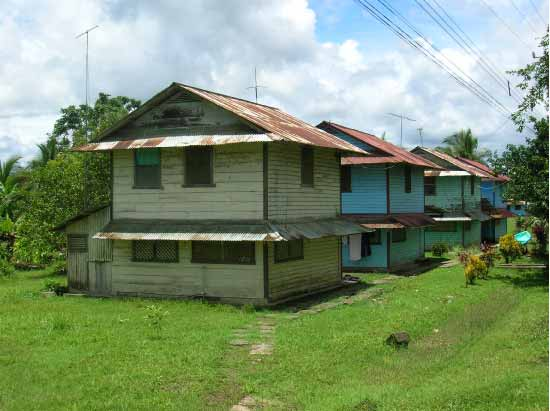
Remnants of UFCO occupation in Palmar Sur

Before the arrival of the Compañía Bananera de Costa Rica, a branch of the United Fruit Company, and banana plantations in the 1930s, there was dense vegetation in this area. Resources available to Precolumbian inhabitants in this alluvial plain consisted of riverine and ocean resources, including mangrove forests located in the Terraba and Sierpe Rivers.

The rich alluvial soils of this region facilitated agriculture since the 1930s. The United Fruit Company dominated this southern region with banana plantations as early as the 1920s in Parrita and Quepos. The UFCO entered Palmar Sur in the 1930s under the name of Companía Bananera de Costa Rica in an effort to avoid antimonopoly legislature. Today there are still agricultural fields throughout the landscape which are owned by co-ops and consist of plantain, banana, and palm plantations.

== Early researchers in the region ==
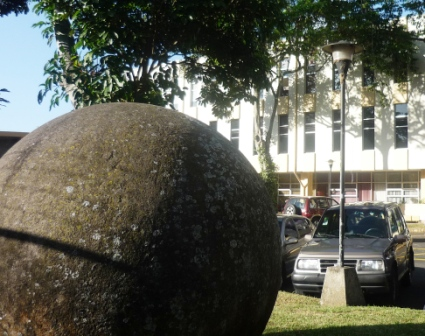
Pre-Columbian stone sphere, located at the University of Costa Rica as a symbol of tradition and ancient wisdom.

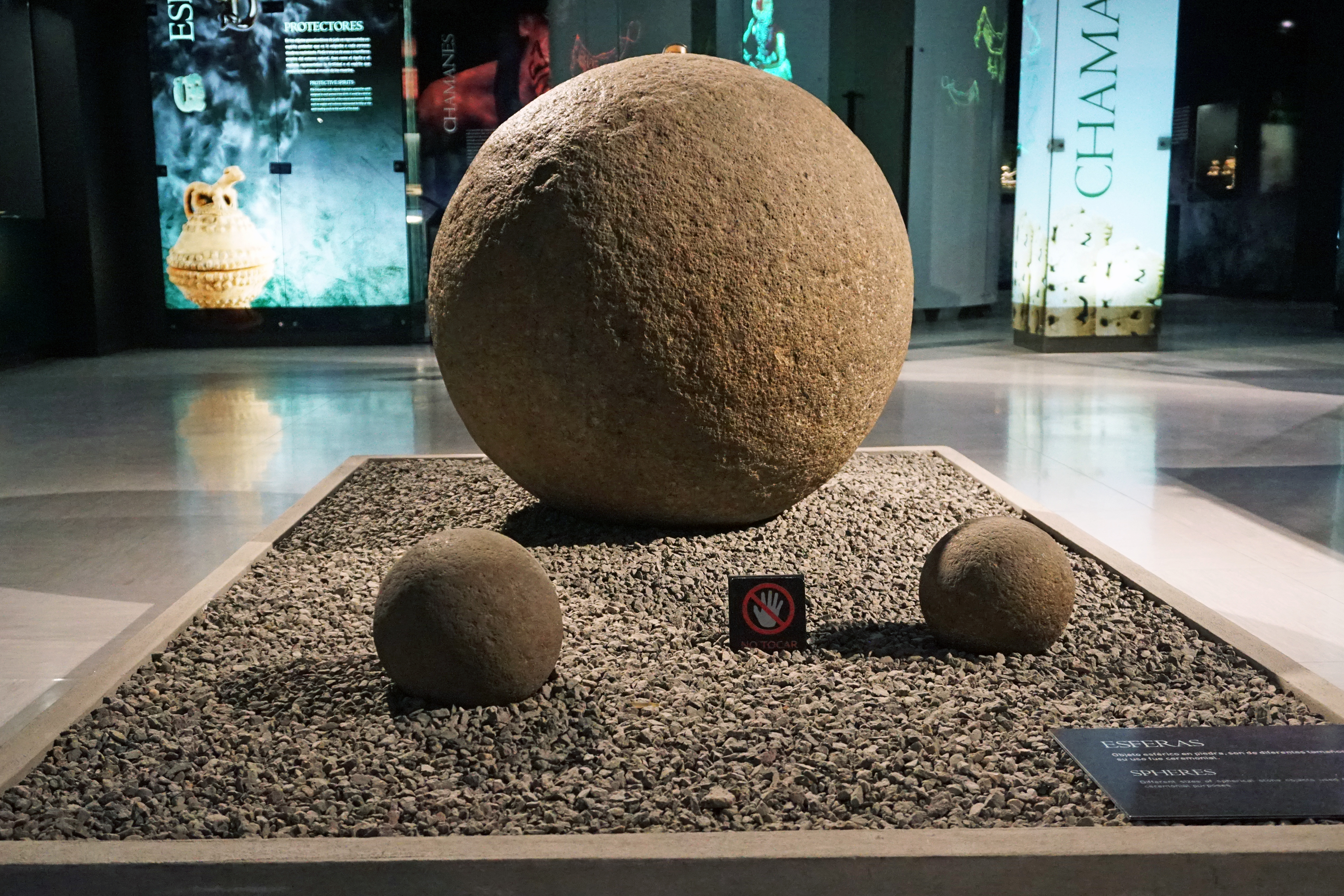
Stone spheres of the Diquís exhibited at Museo del Jade.

Scientific research in the alluvial plain, particularly on United Fruit Company properties, began in the 1940s with the work of Doris Zemurray Stone and Samuel Lothrop. Lothrop's work focused on excavation at a handful of sites, one being Farm 4. His work aimed to document all archaeological sites containing "in situ" stone spheres, to record the number of spheres and their dimensions, and to make detailed maps illustrating both their arrangement and alignments.

After the work of Lothrop and Stone, research in the area took a hiatus for nearly fifty years. In the 1990s, Claude Baudez and a team of researchers set out to establish a ceramic chronology of the region by observing the change in ceramic styles over time. This was accomplished by examining the drainage ditches that were cut into the landscape by the UFCO. Research carried out by Ifigenia Quintanilla, under the direction of the MNCR from 1991 to 1996 was performed in the region under the project titled "Man and Environment in Sierpe-Terraba" focusing on settlement patterns, occupational sequences, and resources utilized in the region.

Francisco Corrales and Adrian Badilla, archaeologists with the Museo Nacional de Costa Rica, have performed continuous research in the region since 2002. Their research began in 2002 and focused on four archaeological sites in the region containing stone spheres and of which comprise a "circuit". These sites include Grijalba, Batambal, El Silencio, and "Farm 6". The purpose of the project was to assess the cultural significance of the sites, to protect the cultural heritage, in addition to beginning research and studies at the sites. Corrales and Badilla produced a booklet entitled El Paisaje Cultural del Delta del Diquís which provides a quick overview on the history of the Diquís Delta, the history of banana plantations and the UFCO, the natural environment, archaeological sites in the region, and the importance of the Diquís region as an UNESCO World Heritage Site. Research has continued in the region by Corrales and Badilla focusing on the archaeology and the Precolumbian political structure in the Diquís Delta. Research emphasis was on chiefdoms and their associated archaeological indicators. Their objectives were to study the archaeological sites containing stone spheres in the Diquís Subregion to gain an understanding of community configuration, activity areas, sequences of occupation, and the recording of monumental architecture.

== Current research ==
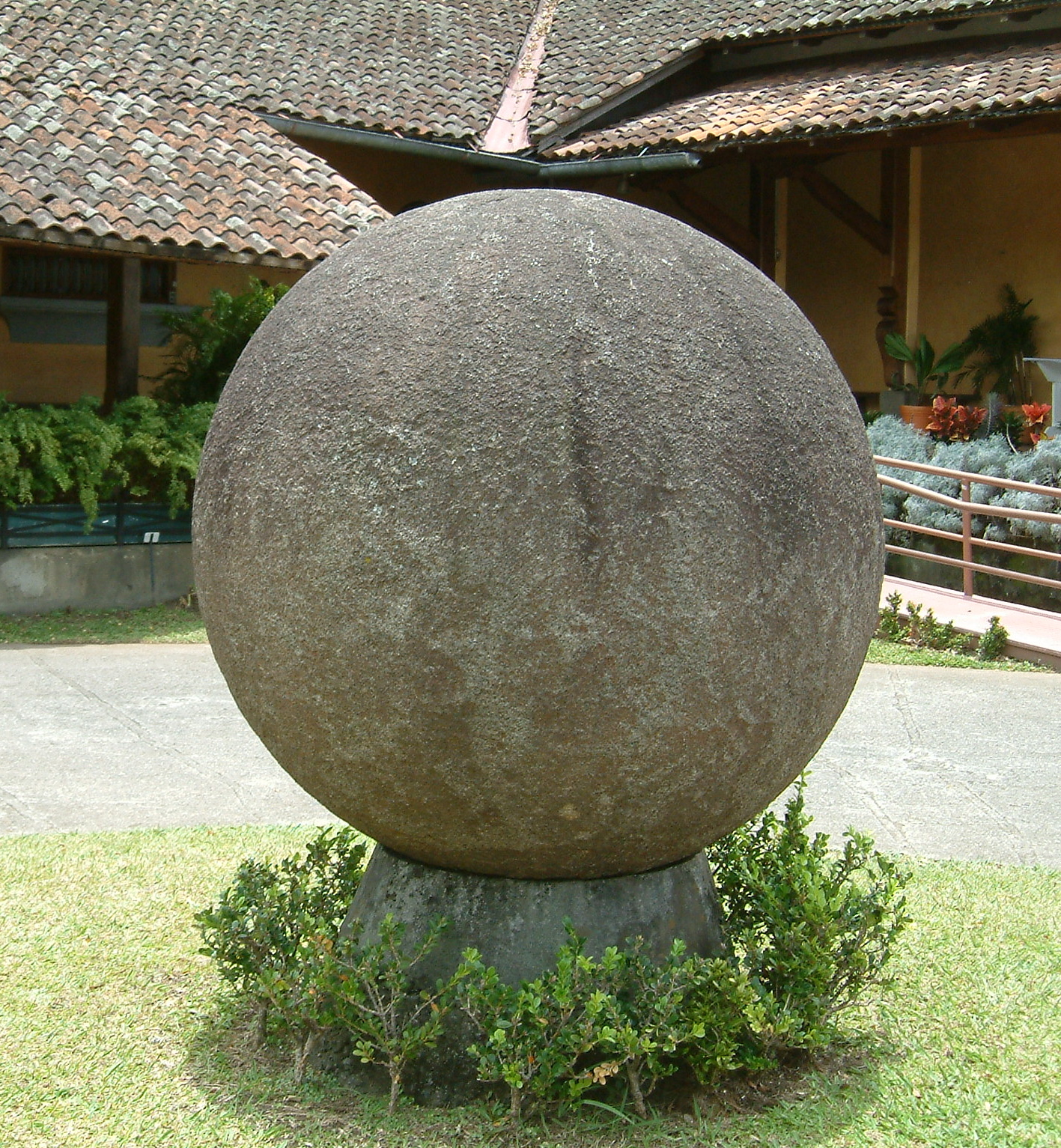
Stone sphere made by the Diquís culture in the courtyard of the National Museum of Costa Rica.

Research is currently ongoing at the "Farm 6" site under the direction of archaeologists at the Museo Nacional de Costa Rica. The first field season in which archaeological excavations were undertaken was in 2005. Objectives during this field season included defining the area in which two mounds were located, sphere alignments, and various excavations associated with mound 2. In 2007, as second field season was undertaken focusing on archaeological excavations of mound 1. During this field season, a stone sphere was discovered in situ in association with the mound.

=== Symbolism ===
The most recent hypothesis regarding the symbolic importance of the stone spheres was developed by Melissa Rudin Hernández, a Costa Rican architect who investigated the cosmovision of indigenous cultures. According to this hypothesis, the spheres are an artistic, symbolic and spiritual creation that came from the pre-Brunka spirituality (Diquís culture).

== Tourism ==
Archaeological tourism is a concept that is still relatively new in Costa Rica. To date, the national monument of Guayabo de Turrialba is primarily the only archaeological site open for tourism. Tourism on a smaller scale is occurring at the site of Farm 6 and is open to visitors upon paying a nominal fee to tour the museum display and then tour the grounds, viewing some of the discovery sites. Future plans of the MNCR are to open the site to tourism on a larger scale and to include other sites nearby in the region.

== Cultural identity ==
The stone spheres are regarded as a national symbol and part of the cultural ethos of Costa Rica, therefore it is common to see them installed in government buildings, such as in the Legislative Assembly of Costa Rica building, where in October 2019, seven spheres lent by the Museo Nacional de Costa Rica were installed inside.

== Art and architecture ==
The stone spheres have been the inspiration for sculptors, such as Ibo Bonilla and Jorge Jiménez Deredia. Also, their symbols has been used by some architects.

=== Gallery: Diquís stone spheres in art ===
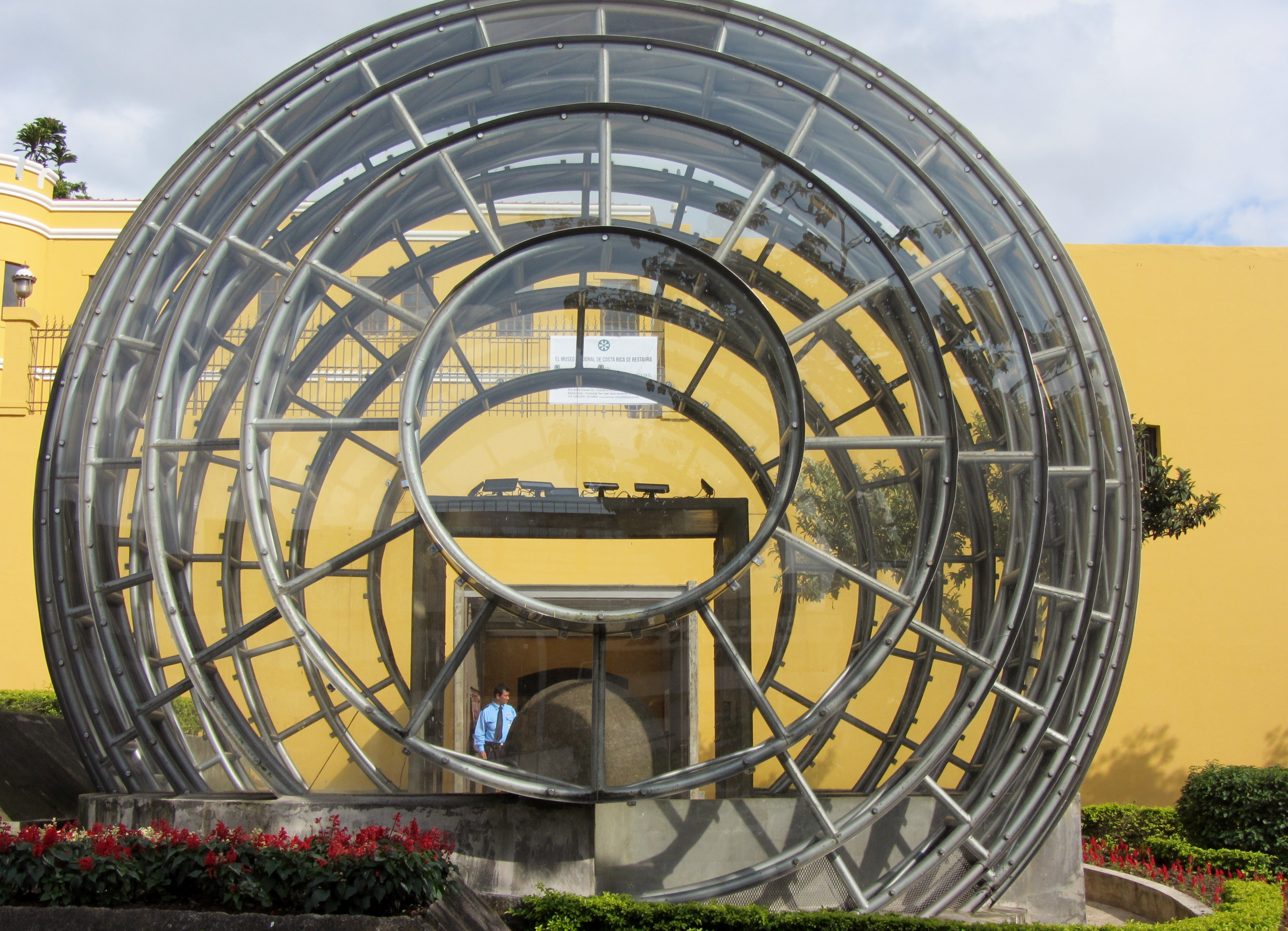
Diquís stone sphere inside a glass and steel spherical structure at the main entrance of Museo Nacional de Costa Rica.

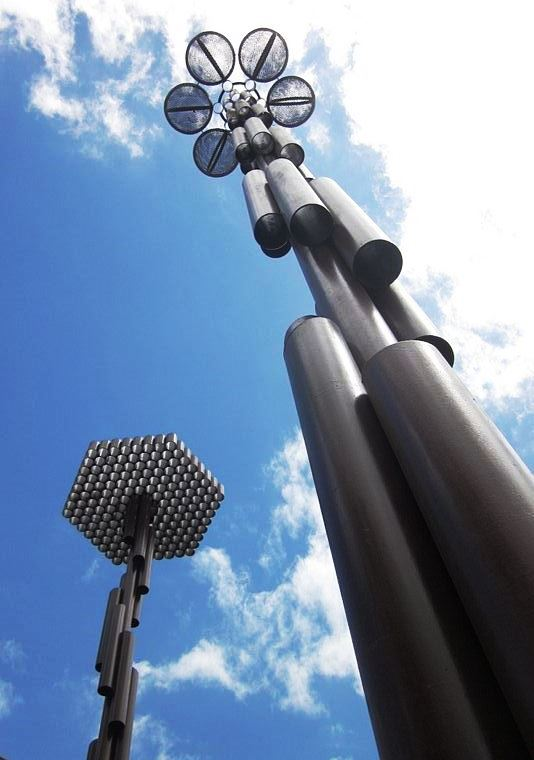
Steel sculpture by Ibo Bonilla, with 18 m (59 ft) is the tallest in Costa Rica

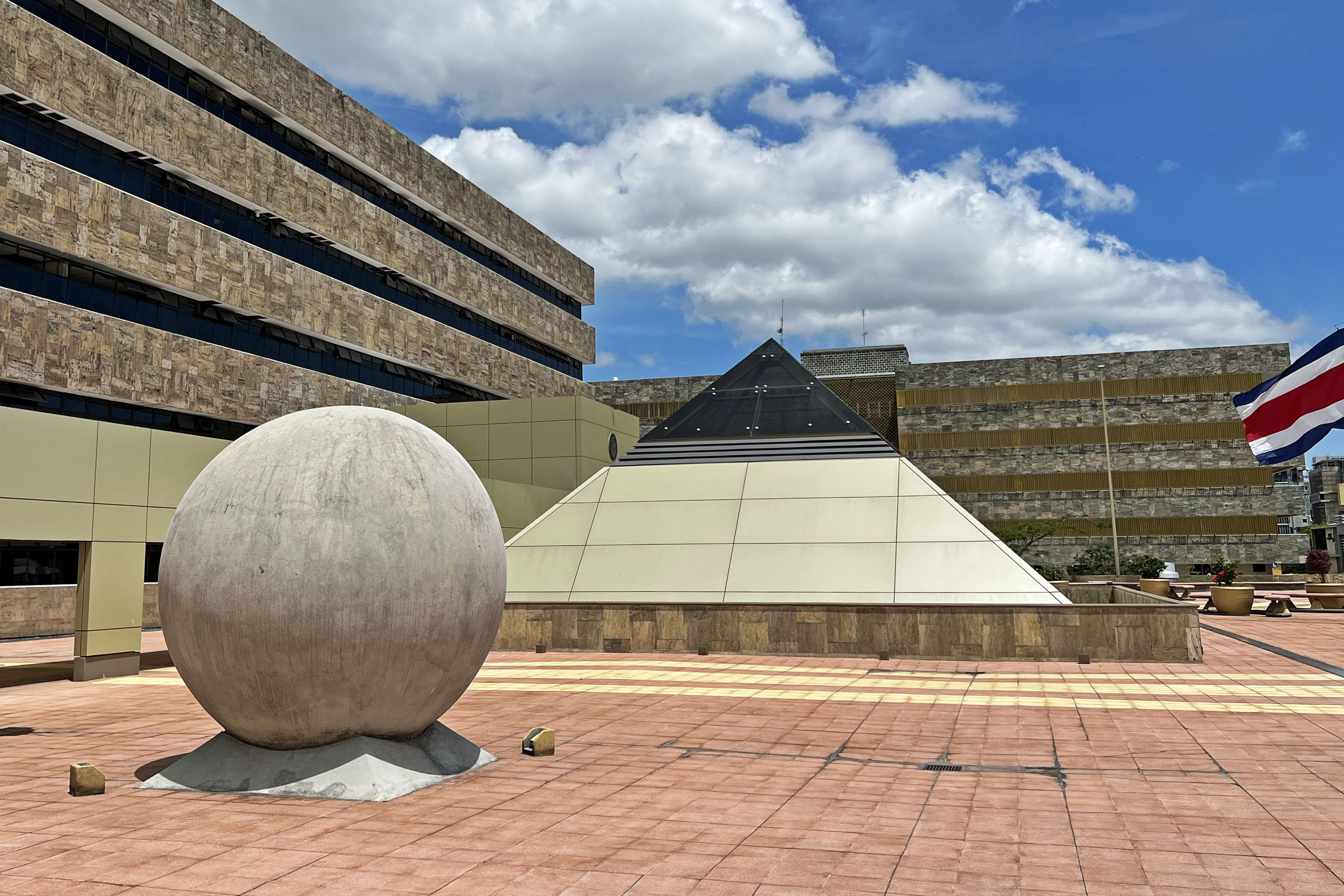
Architectonic-sculptural arrangement at Plaza de la Justicia, San José, by Ibo Bonilla.

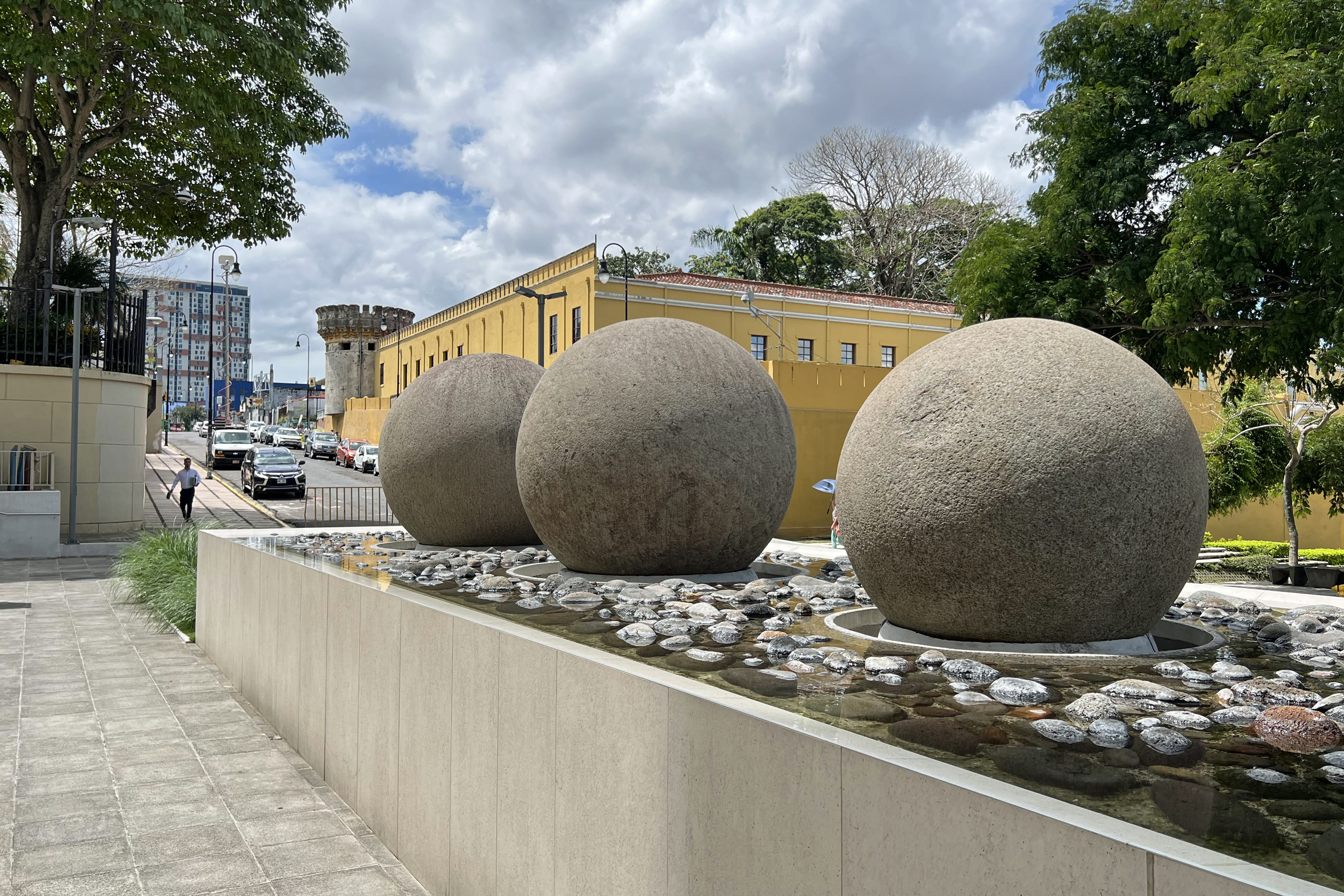
Diquís stone spheres at the main entrance of Costa Rica's new Legislative Assembly building, San José

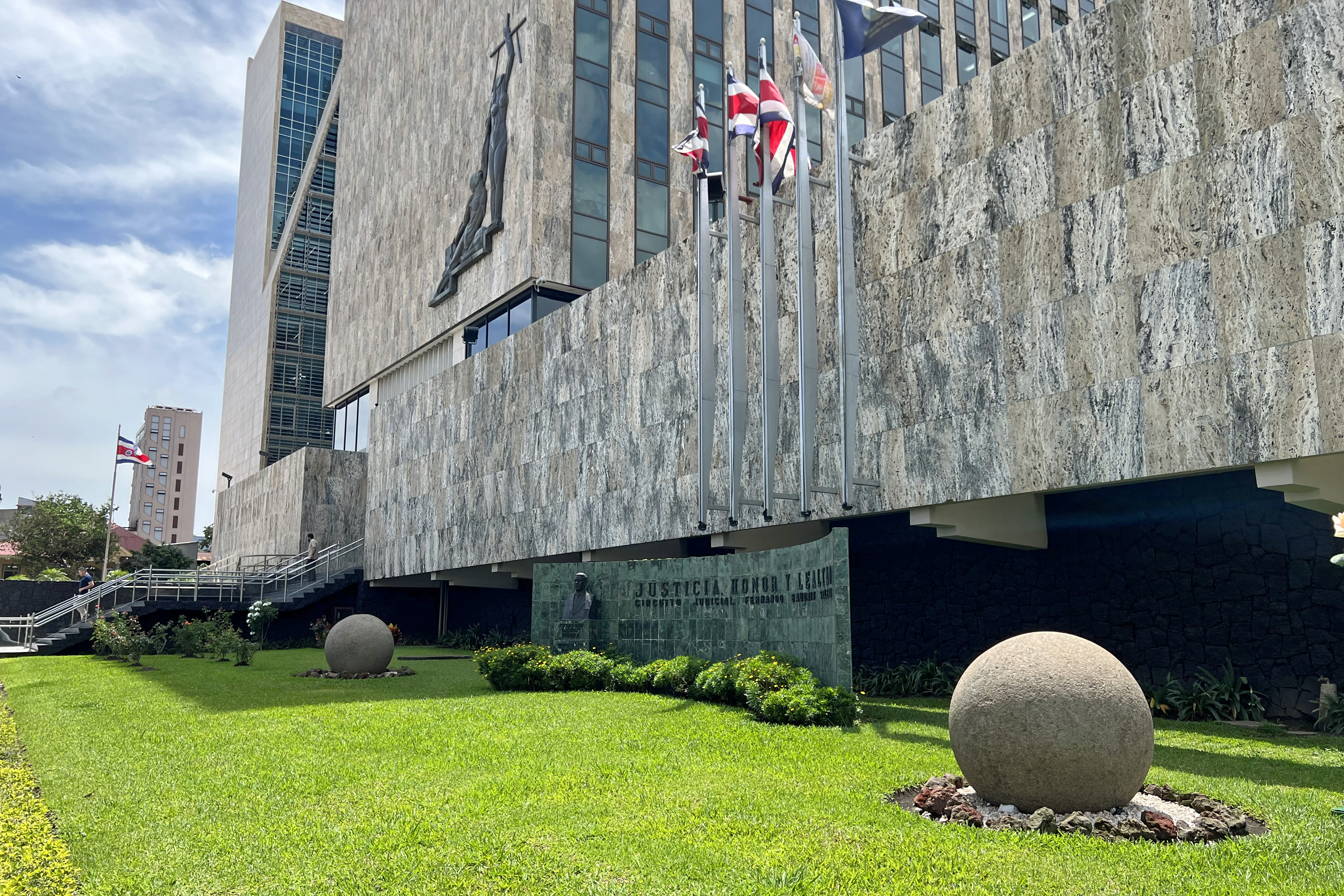
Stone spheres of the Diquís in front of the Supreme Court of Justice of Costa Rica, San José

== Myths ==
Numerous myths surround the stones, including that they came from Atlantis, or that they were naturally created. Some local legends state that the native inhabitants had access to a potion able to soften the rock. Limestone, for example, can be dissolved by acidic solutions obtained from plants. Research led by Joseph Davidovits of the Geopolymer Institute in France has been offered in support of this hypothesis. However, most of the spheres were created from gabbro, an acid-resistant igneous rock.

In the cosmogony of the Bribri, which is shared by the Cabecares and other American ancestral groups, the stone spheres are "Tara's cannon balls". Tara or Tlatchque, the god of thunder, used a giant blowpipe to shoot the balls at the Serkes, gods of winds and hurricanes, in order to drive them out of these lands.

It has been claimed that the spheres are perfect, or very near perfect in roundness, although some spheres are known to vary over 5 centimetres (2.0 in) in diameter. Also, the stones have been damaged and eroded over the years, so it is impossible to know their exact original shape. A review of the manner in which the stones were measured by Lothrop reveals that claims of precision were due to misinterpretations of the methods used in their measurement. Although Lothrop published tables of ball diameters with figures to three decimal places, these figures were actually averages of measurements taken with tapes that were nowhere near that precise.

== See also ==
- Betz mystery sphere – Metal sphere found in 1974 in Florida, United States
- Embassy of Costa Rica, Washington, D.C.
- Barrigones of Guatemala
- Klerksdorp sphere – Natural nodule-like rock concretions
- Kugel fountain – Sphere floating on a very thin film of water on a fountain basin
- List of megalithic sites
- Moeraki Boulders – Large spherical boulders on Otago coast, New Zealand
- Olmec colossal heads – Stone representations of human heads
