= Diquis =

Pre-Columbian indigenous culture of Costa Rica

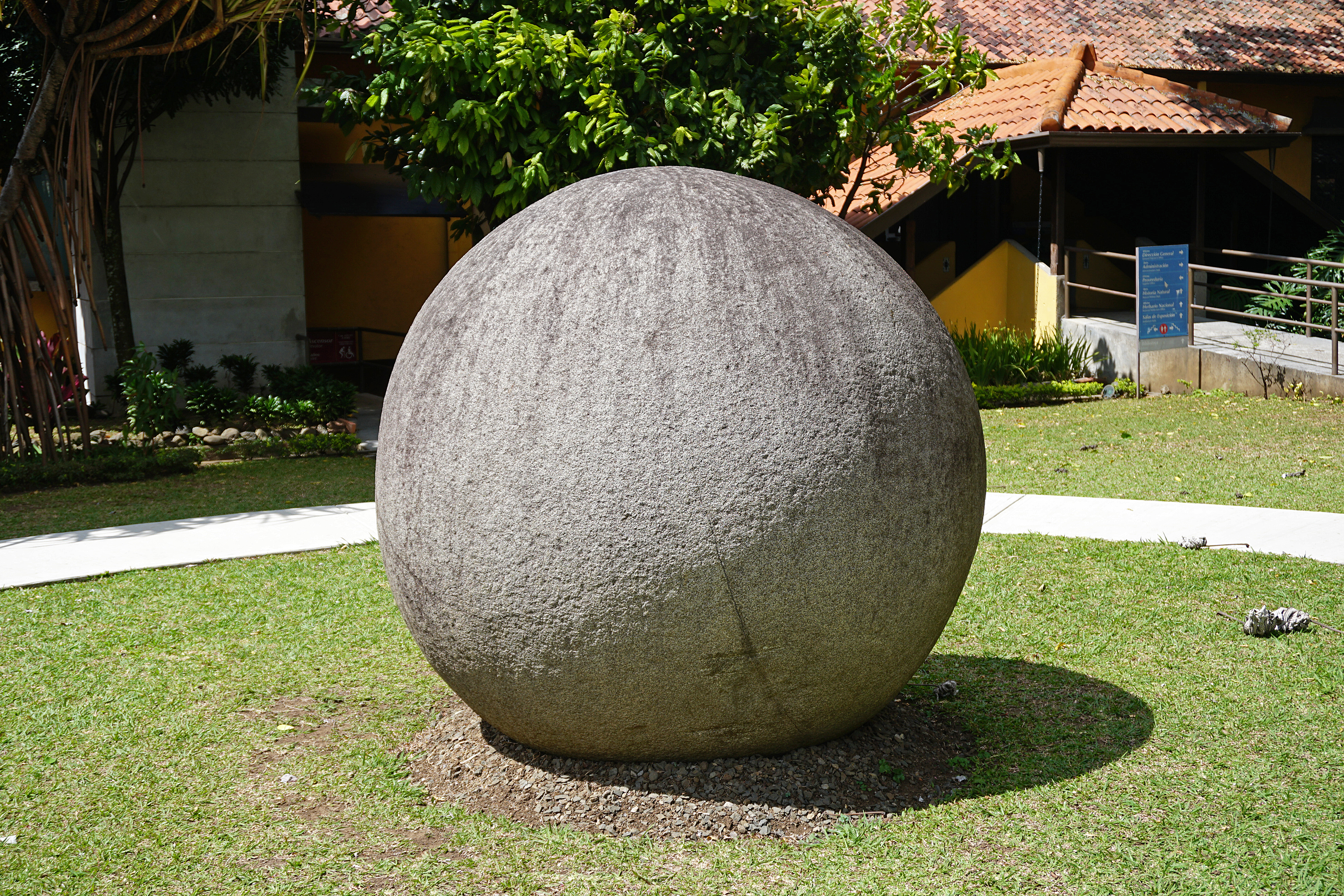
Stone sphere made by the Diquis culture.

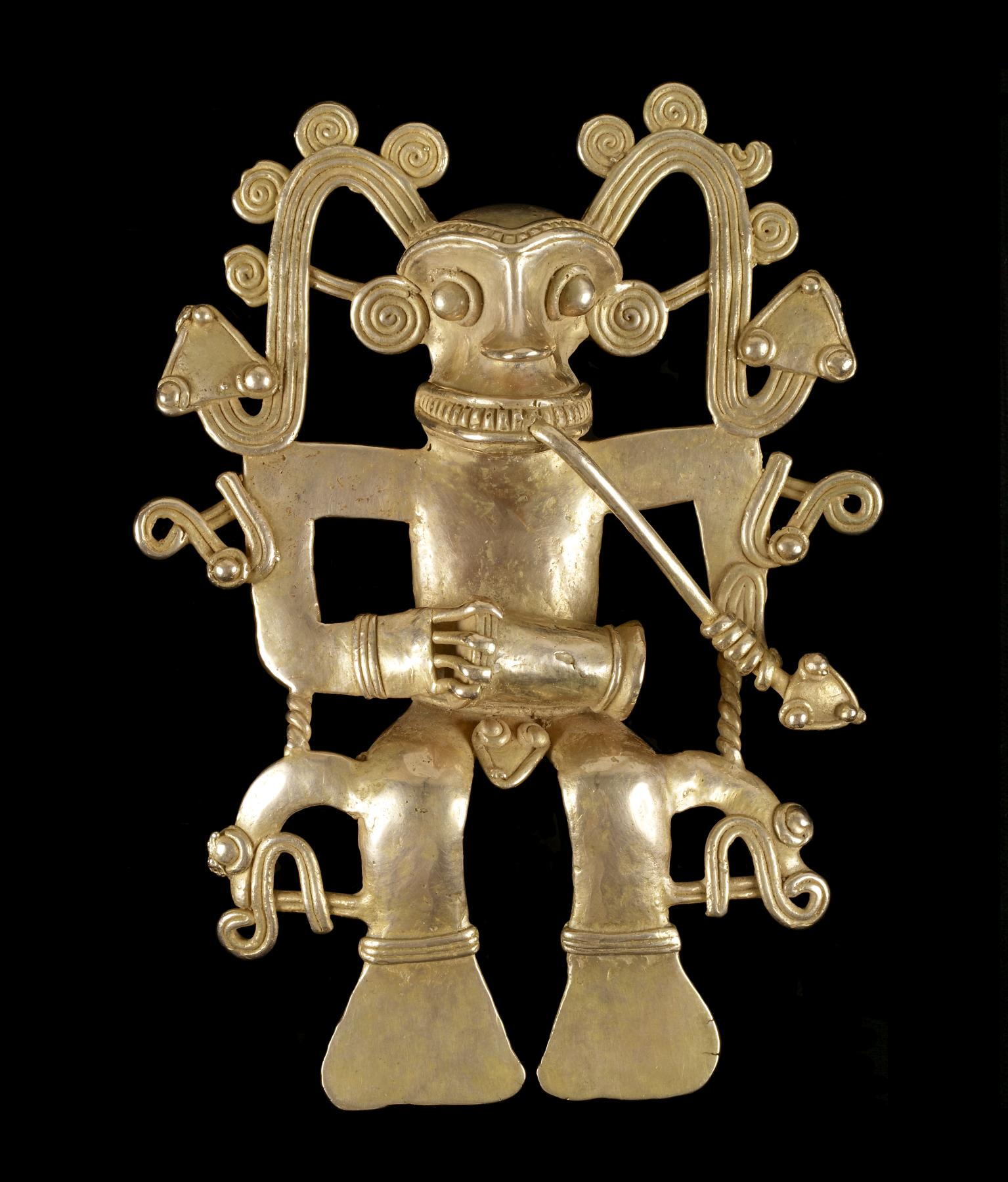
A Diquis human effigy pendant.

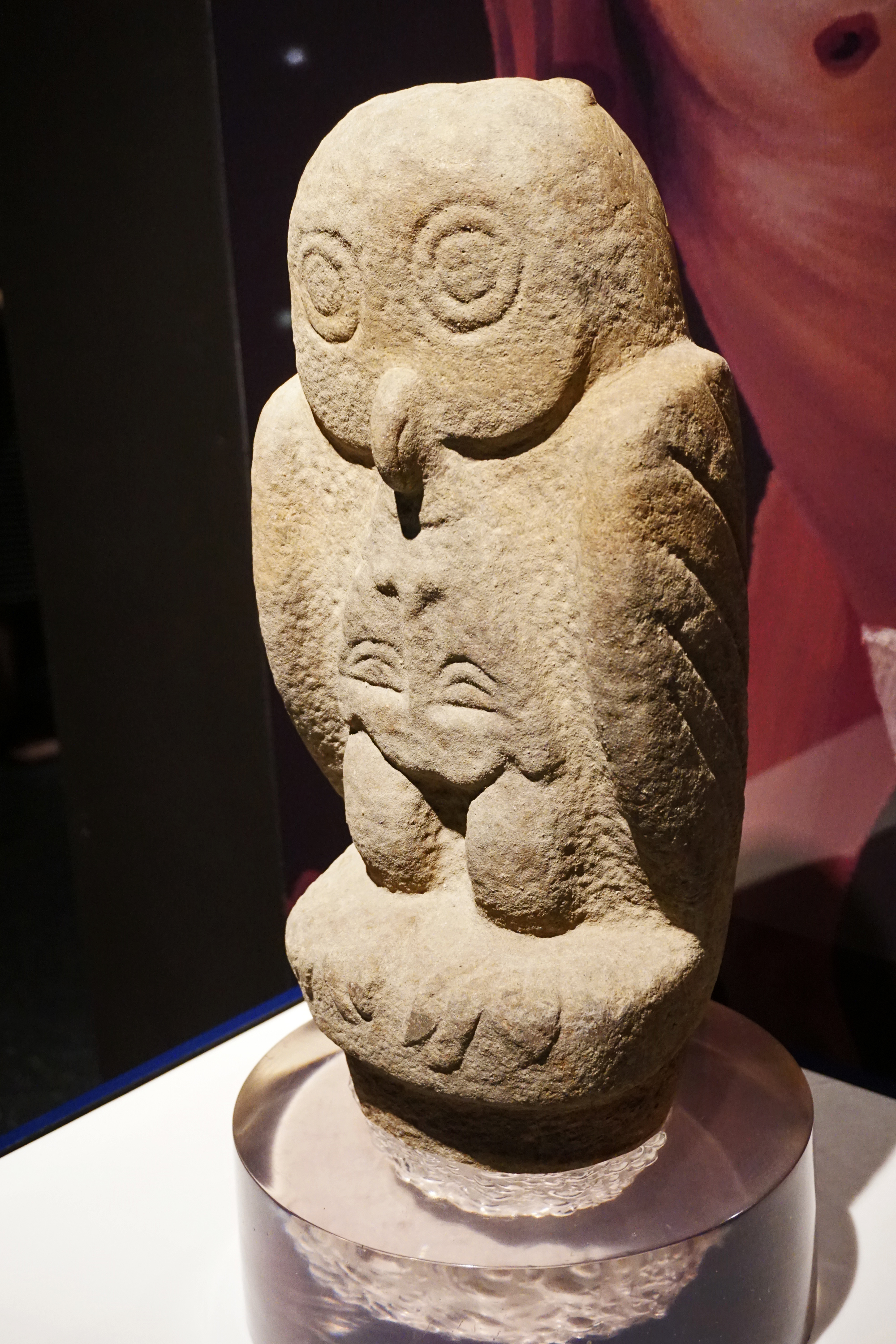
Diquis stone owl

The Diquis culture (sometimes spelled Diquís) was a pre-Columbian indigenous culture of Costa Rica that flourished from AD 700 to 1530. The word "diquís" means "great waters" or "great river" in the Boruca language. The Diquis formed part of the Greater Chiriqui culture that spanned from southern Costa Rica to western Panama.

== Cultural manifestations ==
Three types of artifacts have been found in the delta that are unique to the region and appear to have been part of the specialized industry for the production of power symbols: Stone spheres, Peg-based statues that depict women and men, and the delta’s metallurgy, represented by gold and tumbaga artifacts.

=== Stone spheres ===
The Diquis are known for stone spheres, sometimes referred to as the Diquís Spheres, an assortment of over three hundred petrospheres in Costa Rica.

The stone spheres are megaliths sculpted from mainly gabbro or granodiorite rocks, dating from between 300 BC. C. and 300 AD. C. They are considered the main and most important cultural representation of the people of Diquís, as well as the most important pre-Columbian legacy of Costa Rica. They are located mainly in the valley of the Grande de Térraba River in about 34 archaeological sites, although they have also been found in the Pacific plains, on the Isla del Caño and a single site on the Papagayo peninsula, in the province of Guanacaste. The Diquís valley is the only place where they are preserved in their original location, in circular, semicircular and triangular alignments, close to where the main chief settlements were located, next to the statues with a spike base, in the open areas and in the main squares of the villages.

Their size ranges from a few centimeters to 2.5 meters in diameter, with a weight that ranges from a few kilograms to 15 tons. The raw materials with which they were sculpted have not been found in the areas of the sites, so it is believed that either the material was brought from another place, such as the Brunqueña Mountain Range, where there are deposits of these materials, or they were sculpted and transported from those places.

Their meaning is also a matter of debate: it was initially postulated that they were symbols of rank, power and ethnic identity, given that their number, finish and size is greater near the villages. However, the discovery of solitary spheres has interpreted their use as a territorial marker. Their function as mnemonic artifacts has also been postulated, that is, as memory aids, in association with the study of celestial phenomena and natural, agricultural and calendar cycles, or their use as astronomical gardens that represent sidereal elements, such as constellations, although the alignments found could not be associated with any stellar grouping. They have been associated with the equinoxes and solstices, for which their arrangement would be modified depending on the sunrise, trajectory and setting of the sun.

The most recent hypothesis - raised by the Costa Rican architect Melissa Rudin through her research - is also based on mythical-religious aspects: the spheres are representations of Centers of the World; that is - within the worldview of the culture - they are considered beings that house universes within themselves and are charged with energy.

The stone spheres are considered a historical milestone of Costa Rica's pre-Hispanic past, since they are a formal synthesis that denotes a unique degree of plastic maturity. Their size and numbers in Costa Rica know no parallel in any other culture anywhere else in the world. Today, the stone spheres are the national symbol of Costa Rica and have been declared a World Heritage Site by UNESCO.

=== Statuary ===
The elongated, flattened peg-base statues of men and women are representative of a distinct style associated with the Diquis region. The statues were made primarily from four types of material: gabbro, granodiorite, limestone, and sandstone. They varied in size from 50 cm to two meters. Lizard or feline masks are a major motif in the delta’s statuary and metallurgy, while geometric motifs are found in both the ceramics and statuary of the delta. The statues along with the stone spheres may have formed a group of public symbols. These in conjunction with the construction of mounds and public plazas point to established social structures that among the culture they were utilized in. Multiple sculptures have been found that portray individuals holding or wearing disembodied heads. Almost all of the statues are made of vesicular andesite, volcanic rock abundant in the area.

== See also ==
- Stone spheres of Costa Rica
