= Frank Figueroa =

Frank Figueroa was a high-ranking agent of the United States Immigration and Customs Enforcement (ICE), which is the largest and primary investigative arm of the United States Department of Homeland Security (DHS).

Figueroa was formerly in charge of the Tampa office of the United States Immigration and Customs Enforcement. He was special agent who worked with Operation Predator, an anti-child-predator program from the Department of Homeland Security.

In 2005, Figueroa was caught on video tape exposing and fondling himself in front of a 16-year-old girl in the food court of Millenia Mall in Orlando, FL. Figueroa was suspended, apparently with pay, and then allowed to retire with his full pension and no conviction on his record.
