= Tite Figueroa =

Puerto Rican baseball player (born 1926)

- Pitcher
- Born: September 26, 1926; Mayagüez, Puerto Rico
- Died: April 25, 1986 (aged 59); Mayagüez, Puerto Rico
- Batted: Left Threw: Left

Negro league baseball debut
- 1946, for the Baltimore Elite Giants

Last appearance
- 1946, for the Baltimore Elite Giants
- Stats at Baseball Reference

Teams
- Baltimore Elite Giants (1946)

Enrique Figueroa Freyre (September 26, 1926 – April 25, 1986), nicknamed "Tite", was a Puerto Rican pitcher in the Negro leagues.

A native of Mayagüez, Puerto Rico, Figueroa was the brother of fellow Negro leaguer Tito Figueroa. He pitched for the Baltimore Elite Giants in 1946. Figueroa died in Mayagüez in 1986 at age 59.
