= Francisco de Figueroa =

Francisco de Figueroa may refer to:

- Francisco de Figueroa (bishop) (1634–1691), Spanish Roman Catholic bishop
- Francisco de Figueroa (poet) (1530–1588), Spanish poet
- Francisco Acuña de Figueroa (1791–1862), Uruguayan poet and writer

== See also ==
- Francisco Figueroa (disambiguation)
