= Figueras (surname) =

Figueras is a surname. Notable people with the surname include:

- Josep Figueras (born 1963), Spanish health policy researcher
- Alfons Figueras (1922–2009), Spanish cartoonist
- Amanda Figueras (born 1978), Spanish journalist
- Estanislao Figueras (1819–1882), Spanish politician
- Giuliano Figueras (born 1976), Italian cyclist
- Jordi Figueras Montel (born 1987), Spanish footballer
- José Juan Figueras (born 1979), Spanish footballer
- Marcelo Figueras (born 1962), Argentine writer and screenwriter
- Montserrat Figueras (1942–2011), Spanish opera singer
- Nacho Figueras (born 1977), Argentine polo player
- Orlando Figuera (1996–2017), Venezuelan killed during the 2017 protests
- Angela Yoriko Figueras (born 1966), Japanese-Filipino-Spanish Beauty Queen and businesswoman
