= Tito Figueroa =

Puerto Rican baseball player (born 1914)

- Pitcher
- Born: June 13, 1914; Mayagüez, Puerto Rico
- Died: April 13, 2004 (aged 89)

Negro league baseball debut
- 1940, for the New York Cubans

Last appearance
- 1940, for the New York Cubans
- Stats at Baseball Reference

Teams
- New York Cubans (1940)

José Antonio Figueroa Freyre (June 13, 1914 – April 13, 2004), nicknamed "Tito", was a Puerto Rican professional pitcher in the Negro leagues.

A native of Mayagüez, Puerto Rico, Figueroa was the brother of fellow Negro leaguer Tite Figueroa. He was a member of the Puerto Rico national baseball team and won the gold medal in javelin at the 1935 and 1938 Central American and Caribbean Games.

Cuban manager León Rojas described Figueroa, along with countryman Juan Guilbe, as one of the premier amateur pitchers of the 1940s. Figueroa and Guilbe both played for the New York Cubans in 1940.

He died in 2004 at age 89.
