= Miguel Figueroa (swimmer) =

Puerto Rican swimmer (born 1965)

Personal information
- Born: September 30, 1965 (age 60)

Sport
- Sport: Swimming

Miguel Figueroa (born 30 September 1965) is a former Puerto Rican swimmer who competed in the 1984 Summer Olympics. Miguel was also the MVP in the 1985 LAI (Liga Atletica Interuniversitaria of Puerto Rico) Championships 6 Records in five events ranging from the 100 meters free to 1500 free. He was also a member of the 1985 LAI CAAM championship water polo team.
