= Francisco García de la Rosa Figueroa =

Francisco García de la Rosa Figueroa (b. latter 18th century in Toluca, Mexico; d, unknown) was a Franciscan who supervised the compilation of a significant catalogue of historical documents relating to the Spanish colonial period of Latin America. He was lector emeritus of his order, prefect of studies of the college of Tlatelolco, superior of general convents, definitor, custodian, twice provincial of the province of Santo Evangelio, and visitor to the other provinces of New Spain.

== Career ==
On 21 February 1790, a royal order was received directing that all documents shedding light on the history of New Spain should be copied and sent to Spain. The Count of Revillagigedo (viceroy from 1789 to 1794) entrusted to Figueroa the work of selecting, arranging, and copying these manuscripts.

In under three years, Figueroa produced thirty-two folio volumes. One copy, which was sent to Spain and examined by chronicler Muñoz, is preserved in the Academia de Historia; the other was kept in Mexico in the Secretaría del Virreinado, and is currently kept in the general archives of the Palacio Nacional. The first volume of this copy was missing, but in about 1872, a copy of it was created from the version preserved in Madrid. To the original thirty-two volumes a minute index of the contents was added, compiled years afterwards by Franciscans. Two other copies were found; one remained in Mexico, and the other was taken to the United States to the H.H. Bancroft collection.

== Contents of the volumes ==
I. Thirty fragments from the Museo de Boturini, among them four letters from Juan María de Salvatierra.

II. Treatise on political virtues by Carlos de Sigüenza y Góngora; life and martyrdom of the children of Tlaxcala; narrative of Mexico by Father Geronimo Salmeron, Father Velez, and others.

III. Report of Father Posadas on Texas; three fragments on ancient history, Canticles of Nezahualcoyotl, etc.

IV. Narrative of Ixtlixochitl.

V-VI. Conquest of the Kingdom of Nueva Galicia by Matías de la Mota Padilla.

VII-VIII. Introduction to the history of Michoacán.

IX-X-XI. Chronicle of Michoacán by Fray Pablo Beaumont.

XII. Mexican Chronicle by Fernando Alvarado Tezozómoc.

XIII. History of the Chichimecas by Ixtlilxochitl.

XIV. Reminiscences of Mexico City. Reminiscences for the history of Sinaloa.

XVI-XVII. Notes for the history of Sonora.

XVIII. Letters to elucidate the history of Sonora and Sinaloa.

XIX-XX. Documents for the history of Nueva Vizcaya (Durango).

XXI. Establishment and progress of the Missions of Old California.

XXII-XXIII. Notes on New California.

XXIV. Log-book kept by the Fathers Garcés, Barbastro, Font, and Capellio; voyage of the frigate Santiago; "Diario" of Urrea and of D.J.B. Anza, etc.

XXV-XXVI. Documents for the ecclesiastical and civil history of New Mexico.

XXVII-XXVIII. Documents for the civil and ecclesiastical history of Spanish Texas.

XXIX. Documents for the history of Coahuila and Central Mexico (Seno Mexicano).

XXX. Tampico, Río Verde, and Nuevo León.

XXXI. Notes on the cities of Veracruz, Cordova, Oaxaca, Puebla, Tepotzotlán, Querétaro, Guanajuato, Guadalajara, Zacatecas, Nootka.

XXXII. Reminiscences of Mexican Native Americans.
