= José María Figueroa Oreamuno =

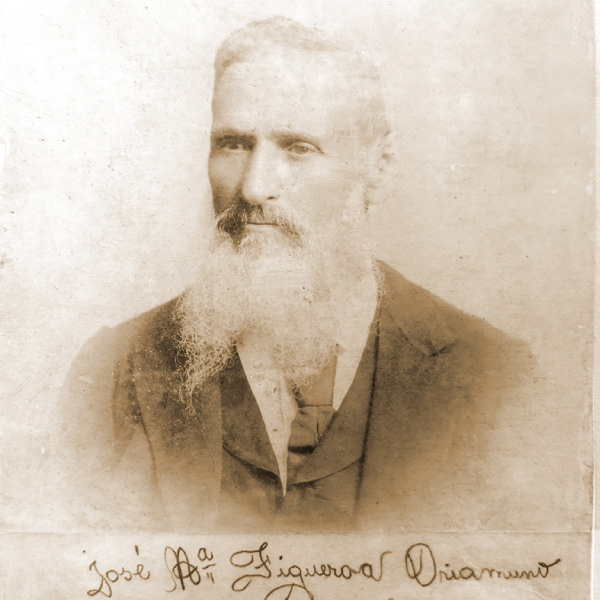
- Born: December 17, 1820; Alajuela Province
- Died: August 18, 1900 (aged 79); Cartago
- Occupation: Writer, cartographer, explorer, merchant, genealogist, poet, caricaturist, ethnographer, and draftsman
- Language: Spanish
- Citizenship: Costa Rica
- Subject: Various
- Notable works: Figueroa Album

José María Figueroa Oreamuno (Alajuela, December 17, 1820 – Cartago, August 18, 1900) was a Costa Rican writer, cartographer, explorer, merchant, genealogist, poet, caricaturist, ethnographer, and draftsman. The Figueroa Album – composed of a series of drawings, maps, family trees, photographs, caricatures, manuscripts – is considered an important document in the history of Costa Rica.

== Biography ==
Figueroa was born in Alajuela in 1820 to Ramona Estéfana Oreamuno Jiménez and Antonio Figueroa Oreamuno; the latter an émigrée merchant from Tenerife, who arrived in Costa Rica in 1806 and served as Political Chief of Cartago during the government of Braulio Carrillo Colina.

Figueroa was politically progressive for his time, making him unpopular in conservative 19th-century Cartago. In 1843, he was engaged in a controversy over lewd drawings of Cartago ladies. Between 1855 and 1864, he lived in exile in Nicaragua, from which country he traveled for periods to El Salvador and Panama. In El Salvador, he met and became friends with Francisco Morazán. Figueroa was even sentenced to death at one stage, but managed to escape.

Later in his life he devoted himself to agriculture, mining and property development. On June 17, 1885, during the government of Bernardo Soto Alfaro, he was appointed colonizer of Guatuso. In 1890, he was part of the Commission for the Mapping of Costa Rica, a project he worked on alongside the Swiss Henri Pittier.

Although he never married, he left his inheritance to an illegitimate daughter, Herminia Figueroa Arlegui.

He died in Cartago on 18 August 1900 of heart failure.

== Works ==
His best-known work is the Figueroa Album, a collection of clippings and drawings in which the author included a wealth of information about 19th-century Costa Rica. The album consists of 191 pages of various sizes, containing manuscripts, drawings, maps, family trees, photographs, population statistics, and caricatures covering a wide variety of topics. These include the history of Costa Rica's indigenous peoples, the arrival of Europeans, the Spanish Conquest and Colonial period, the nation's early years of independence, narratives and descriptions of daily and political life, travel diaries, and notes on seismology, geography, history, and anthropology. The album also contains an early geographic map of Costa Rica.

Although there is no probable date for the beginning of Figueroa's collection, it is estimated that he began collecting it around 1864, upon his return from exile, and continued it until his death in 1900. During Rafael Yglesias Castro's administration, the work was acquired by the government and handed over to the National Archive of Costa Rica for safekeeping in 1903. Years later, it was moved to the National Library, only to return to the Archive in 1995, where it was restored and then exhibited in 2011. In 2009, the Figueroa Album was inscribed on UNESCO's Memory of the World Register.

The National Archive also holds four other notebooks by the author, known as the Figueroa Notebooks, which are not part of the Album. These were discovered in 2007 in the personal library of President Rafael Yglesias. It is presumed that the author worked on them between 1870 and 1890. Based on their content, the notebooks have been titled as follows:

1. The Green Notebook, which contains poems, songs, and satirical verses about political events in the country, such as Tomás Guardia Gutiérrez's coup d'état in 1870, the border dispute with Colombia, and the opposition to liberal politicians and Freemasons. In this notebook, Figueroa satirizes and caricatures Tomás Guardia. It also contains a fictional story about the adventures of a character on the Atlantic coast of Costa Rica.
2. The Red Notebook contains drawings, texts, poems, and satirical phrases directed at rulers, ministers, representatives, and political figures. In this notebook, Figueroa mocks political flattery, liberal politicians, and the double standards of the time. It also describes the Cartago of the author's childhood.
3. The Animal Notebook contains sketches about animals, as well as texts describing building materials, ornaments, and decorative moldings.
4. The Alphabet Notebook contains sketches and drawing exercises of human figures and animals, coats of arms of American countries, and drawings of letters made with human figures.
5. A fifth notebook, the Violet Book, disappeared during the transfer of the notebooks to the National Archives.

== Bibliography ==
- Arroyo, Jorge (2006). Figueroa, notario de la patria inédita. EUNED. ISBN 978-9968-31-490-9. Consultado el 31 de mayo de 2025.
- El álbum de Figueroa: un viaje por las páginas del tiempo, de Jorge Arroyo y la Dirección General del Archivo Nacional de Costa Rica.
- El álbum de Figueroa. El interés de un hombre por plasmar en un documento archivístico la evolución histórico-social costarricense, de Esteban Cabezas Bolaños y Jorge Emilio Jiménez Espinoza.
