= Villa de Bruselas =

Villa de Bruselas was the first Spanish colony in Costa Rica.

Built near to an indigenous site, the Spanish colony was founded in early 1524. By 1529, the town had been depopulated.
