= Francisco Ramón Herboso y Figueroa =

Archbishop Francisco Ramón Herboso y Figueroa (c. 1720–1782) was born in Lima. He was the archbishop of La Plata o Charcas, an area now known as Sucre, Bolivia. He was appointed to this position in 1776. He died in Charcas Province.

== External links and additional sources ==
- Cheney, David M. "Archdiocese of Sucre". Catholic-Hierarchy.org. (for Chronology of Bishops)^{self-published}
- Chow, Gabriel. "Metropolitan Archdiocese of Sucre". GCatholic.org. (for Chronology of Bishops)^{self-published}
