= Pablo Higueras =

Swiss footballer (born 1967)

Personal information
- Date of birth: 8 September 1967 (age 59)
- Position: Midfielder

Senior career*
Years	Team	Apps	(Gls)
–1986	FC Lausanne-Sport		
1987–1990	FC Malley		
1990–1993	FC Bulle		
- * Club domestic league appearances and goals

Pablo Higueras (born 8 September 1967) is a retired Swiss football midfielder.
