= Public holidays in Costa Rica =

The following are the national public holidays of Costa Rica. Of the twelve days, nine are paid holidays and three are not.

== Public holidays ==
Date	English name	Local name	Remarks
January 1	New Year's Day	Año Nuevo	The celebration of the first day of the Gregorian Calendar.
The Thursday before Easter Sunday	Maundy Thursday	Jueves Santo	
The Friday before Easter Sunday	Good Friday	Viernes Santo	
April 11	Juan Santamaria Day	Día de Juan Santamaria	Santamaria was a hero in the battle against North American Filibuster William Walker in 1856.
May 1	Labour Day	Día Internacional del Trabajo	
July 25	Annexation of the Party of Nicoya to Costa Rica	Anexión del Partido de Nicoya a Costa Rica	Celebrates the annexation of the Party of Nicoya in 1824.
August 2	Feast of Our Lady of the Angels	Fiesta de Nuestra Señora de los Ángeles	Employers must provide an unpaid day off.
August 15	Mother's Day	Día de la Madre	Also the Assumption of Mary.
August 31	Day of the Black Person and Afro-Costa Rican Culture	Día de la Persona Negra y la Cultra Afrocostarricense	Celebrated since 2021.
September 15	Independence Day	Día de la Independencia	Celebrates the Act of Independence of Central America of 1821.
December 1	Army Abolition Day	Día de la Abolición del Ejército	Celebrates abolition of Costa Rican army since 1948. Employers must provide an unpaid day off.
December 25	Christmas Day	Navidad	

The Day of the Dead (Día de los Muertos) is celebrated each year on 2 November. It is not a public holiday, but neither is it a moveable one because the date is fixed, annually.

== Dates for moveable holidays ==
- 2020
  - July 27 - Annexation of the Party of Nicoya to Costa Rica
  - August 17 - Mother's Day
  - September 14 - Independence Day
  - November 30 - Army Abolition Day
- 2021
  - May 3 - Labour Day
  - July 26 - Annexation of the Party of Nicoya to Costa Rica
  - September 13 - Independence Day
  - November 29 - Army Abolition Day
- 2022
  - September 19 - Independence Day
  - December 5 - Army Abolition Day
- 2023
  - April 10 - Juan Santamaría Day
  - July 24 - Annexation of the Party of Nicoya to Costa Rica
  - August 14 - Mother's Day
- 2024
  - April 15 - Juan Santamaría Day
  - July 29 - Annexation of the Party of Nicoya to Costa Rica
  - August 15 - Mother's Day
