= 2025 in Costa Rica =

- Decades: 2000s; 2010s; 2020s
- See also: Other events of 2025; Timeline of Costa Rican history

Events in the year 2025 in Costa Rica.

== Incumbents ==
- President: Rodrigo Chaves Robles
- First Vice President: Stephan Brunner
- Second Vice President: Mary Munive

== Art and entertainment ==
- List of Costa Rican submissions for the Academy Award for Best International Feature Film

== Events ==
=== February ===
- 21 February – The United States deports 135 migrants to Costa Rica.

=== March ===
- 1 March – The Falkland Islands Cricket Team tours the country after 14 years.
- 31 March – The Poás Volcano erupts and sends ash plumes 1,000 m high.

=== June ===
- 19 June – Exiled Nicaraguan opposition figure Roberto Samcam is shot dead at his residence in San Jose.

=== July ===
- 20 July – American actor Malcolm-Jamal Warner dies in a drowning accident in Playa Cocles, Limón Province.
- 31 July – Vice president Stephan Brunner and six ministers resign from the cabinet of president Chaves amid efforts by the ruling Social Democratic Progress Party to obtain a majority in the Legislative Assembly of Costa Rica for the 2026 Costa Rican general election.

=== September ===
- 12 September – Police arrest four suspects in the June killing of exiled Nicaraguan politician Roberto Samcam in San José.
- 22 September – A motion in the Legislative Assembly of Costa Rica to remove Rodrigo Chaves' presidential immunity amid corruption allegations against him fails after coming short of obtaining a supermajority.
- 24 September – All flights to and from Costa Rica are suspended after the radar system of Juan Santamaría International Airport suffers a systems failure.
- 27 September – A Mexican national is seriously injured in a shark attack off the coast of Cocos Island.

=== October ===
- 8 October – President Chaves nominates former vice president Rebeca Grynspan to become the next Secretary-General of the United Nations upon the end of António Guterres' tenure in 2026.
- 15 October – President Chaves restricts the practice of abortion in Costa Rica to situations when the mother’s life is in danger.

=== December ===
- 17 December – The Legislative Assembly of Costa Rica rejects a request by the Supreme Electoral Court of Costa Rica to lift president Chaves' immunity from prosecution as part of an investigation into alleged electoral interference.

== Holidays ==
- 1 January – New Year's Day
- 11 April – Juan Santamaría
- 17 April – Maundy Thursday
- 18 April – Good Friday
- 1 May – Labour Day
- 25 July – Guanacaste Day
- 2 August – Lady of the Angels Day
- 15 August – Assumption Day, Mother's Day
- 31 August – Day of the Black Person and Afro-Costa Rican Culture
- 15 September – Independence Day
- 1 December – Army Abolition Day
- 25 December – Christmas Day

== Deaths ==
- 20 June – Marita Camacho Quirós, 114, first lady (1962–1966).
- 9 July – Brunhilda de Portilla, 96, educator and composer.
- 17 August – José Ricardo Carballo, 42, presenter, journalist and writer.
- 25 September – Karen Olsen Beck, 95, diplomat, first lady (1954–1958, 1970–1974), and MLA (1986–1990).
