= 2024 in Costa Rica =

- Decades: 2000s; 2010s; 2020s
- See also: Other events of 2024; Timeline of Costa Rican history

Events in the year 2024 in Costa Rica.

== Incumbents ==
- President: Rodrigo Chaves Robles
- First Vice President: Stephan Brunner
- Second Vice President: Mary Munive

== Events ==
- 4 February – 2024 Costa Rican municipal elections.
- 22 May – Ligia Madrigal became the first Costa Rican woman and second Costa Rican person to climb Mount Everest. Costa Rican Warner Rojas climbed it in 2012.
- 29 June – Culture Minister Nayuribe Guadamuz is dismissed for giving official backing for a pride parade in San Jose without authorization from President Rodrigo Chaves Robles.
- 14 August – Five officials of the national child welfare agency are arrested on suspicion of trafficking migrant children for adoption.
- 21 October – The Tico Times reports that freedom of expression and press freedom in Costa Rica has grown more restricted, according to the Chapultepec Index of the Inter American Press Association. The country falls to tenth place on the index, from a ranking of seventh in 2023, and fifth in 2022.
- 25 November – A Cessna 206 crashes near Cerro Pico Blanco, killing all but one of its six occupants.

== Art and entertainment ==
- List of Costa Rican submissions for the Academy Award for Best International Feature Film

== Holidays ==
- 1 January – New Year's Day
- 28 March – Maundy Thursday
- 29 March – Good Friday
- 11 April – Juan Santamaría
- 1 May – Labour Day
- 25 July – Guanacaste Day
- 2 August – Lady of the Angels Day
- 15 August – Assumption Day, Mother's Day
- 1 September – Day of the Black Person and Afro-Costa Rican Culture
- 15 September – Independence Day
- 2 November – Day of the Dead (Día de los Muertos).
- 1 December – Army Abolition Day
- 25 December – Christmas Day
