= 1856 in Costa Rica =

Events in the year 1856 in Costa Rica.

== Incumbents ==
- President: Juan Rafael Mora Porras

== Events ==
- March 20 - Battle of Santa Rosa
- April 11 - Campaign of 1856–57: Second Battle of Rivas

== Deaths ==
- April 11 - Juan Santamaria
