= 2026 in Costa Rica =

- Decades: 2000s; 2010s; 2020s
- See also: Other events of 2026; Timeline of Costa Rican history

Events in the year 2026 in Costa Rica.

== Incumbents ==
- President: Rodrigo Chaves Robles (until 8 May); Laura Fernández Delgado (since 8 May)
- First Vice President: Mary Munive (until 8 May); Francisco Gamboa (since 8 May)
- Second Vice President: Douglas Soto

== Art and entertainment ==
- List of Costa Rican submissions for the Academy Award for Best International Feature Film

== Events ==
=== January ===
- 13 January – The Intelligence and National Security Directorate announces the discovery of a plot to assassinate president Rodrigo Chaves Robles.
- 22 January – The United States imposes sanctions on 10 Costa Rican individuals and entities for being part of a transnational crime network transporting cocaine from Colombia into the US.

=== February ===
- 1 February – 2026 Costa Rican general election: Laura Fernández Delgado is elected president with 48.3% of the vote.

=== March ===
- 18 March – Costa Rica breaks diplomatic relations with Cuba and closes its embassy in Havana.
- 20 March –
  - Former Supreme Court justice Celso Gamboa and suspected drug trafficker Edwin Lopez Vega aka "Pecho de Rata" are extradited to the United States to face drug-trafficking and conspiracy charges.
  - Two people are killed in a US airstrike on a suspected drug boat off the Pacific coast of Costa Riza.

=== May ===
- 8 May – Laura Fernández Delgado is inaugurated as president and appoints her predecessor, Rodrigo Chaves Robles, as minister of the presidency and minister of finance.

=== June ===
- 11 June–19 July – Costa Rica participates at the 2026 FIFA World Cup.

=== July ===
- 24 July – The United States imposes a 12.5% tariff on Costa Rica, citing the presence of alleged forced labor in the supply chain.

=== August ===
- 1 August – A magnitude 5.0 earthquake hits Cartago Province, injuring one person.

=== October ===
- 28 October – A bus overturns in Sarapiquí, Heredia Province, killing three people and injuring 54 others.

== Holidays ==
- 1 January – New Year's Day
- 2 April – Maundy Thursday
- 3 April – Good Friday
- 11 April – Juan Santamaría
- 1 May – Labour Day
- 25 July – Guanacaste Day
- 2 August – Lady of the Angels Day
- 15 August – Assumption Day, Mother's Day
- 6 September – Day of the Black Person and Afro-Costa Rican Culture
- 15 September – Independence Day
- 1 December – Army Abolition Day
- 25 December – Christmas Day

== Deaths ==
- 17 March – Lorena Clare Facio, 82, first lady (1998–2002).
