= 2022 in Costa Rica =

- Decades: 2000s; 2010s; 2020s
- See also: Other events of 2022; Timeline of Costa Rican history

Events in the year 2022 in Costa Rica.

== Incumbents ==
- President: Rodrigo Chaves Robles
- First Vice President: Stephan Brunner
- Second Vice President: Mary Munive

== Events ==
- Ongoing – COVID-19 pandemic in Costa Rica
- February 6 – 2022 Costa Rican general election
- February 10 – Costa Rican president Carlos Alvarado Quesada tests positive for COVID-19.
- April 3 – Rodrigo Chaves Robles is elected President of Costa Rica after voters in Costa Rica head to the polls to vote in the second round.
- April 7 – A DHL Boeing 757-200 cargo plane breaks into two parts after making an emergency landing at the Juan Santamaría International Airport in San José, Costa Rica. No one is injured.
- May 31 – A major cyberattack hits the Costa Rican Social Security Fund, forcing the ministry to shut down its digital database and endangering the country's healthcare system.
- June 30 – Hurricane watches are issued for Nicaragua and Costa Rica as Potential Tropical Cyclone Two is expected to form into Tropical Storm Bonnie in the coming hours.
- July 2 – Tropical Storm Bonnie: Tropical Storm Bonnie makes landfall near the Costa Rica–Nicaragua border. The storm subsequently crosses over from the Atlantic basin to the Pacific basin, becoming the first storm to do so since Hurricane Otto in 2016.
- July 8 – Costa Rican President Rodrigo Chaves Robles says that his country will apply to join the Pacific Alliance.

== Deaths ==
- January 4 – Javier Astúa, 53, footballer.
- August 20 – Román Solís Zelaya, 68, jurist.
- November 15 – José León Sánchez, 93, novelist.
- December 22 – Julieta Pinto, 101, educator and writer.

== See also ==
- 2022 Atlantic hurricane season
- COVID-19 pandemic in North America
