= List of radio stations in Costa Rica =

This is a list of radio stations in Costa Rica.

== Radio stations ==
Frequency	Name	Notes
Frequency Modulation (FM)
87.7 FM	Radio 87.7 "El dial que le hace viajar en el tiempo"	
88.3 FM	Radio Colosal	
88.7 FM	Radio 88 Stereo	
91.1 FM	Radio Puntarenas	
91.7 FM	On Radio - Jaco	
91.9 FM	Zoom Radio	
93.5 FM and 670 AM	Radio Monumental	
95.5 FM	95.5 Jazz	
96.3 FM	Radio Centro	
96.7 FM	Radio Universidad de Costa Rica	See: Radio stations of University of Costa Rica.
98.7 FM	Radio Columbia	
99.5 FM	Radio 2	
101.9 FM	Radio U	See: Radio stations of University of Costa Rica.
104.1 FM	Onda Brava Radio (Liberia)	
104.7 FM	Radio Hit	
105.9 FM	Urbano 106	
106.1 FM	Guanacaste FM - TI69LF173 (Comunitaria)	
107.5 FM	Radio 107.5 Real Rock	
Amplitude Modulation (AM)
870 AM	Radio 870 UCR	See: Radio stations of University of Costa Rica.
910 AM	Radio 910 BBN Proclamando La Palabra de Dios a los Cuatro Vientos	

== See also ==
- Media of Costa Rica

Radios de Costa Rica
