= 2021 in Costa Rica =

- Decades: 2000s; 2010s; 2020s
- See also: Other events of 2021; Timeline of Costa Rican history

Events in the year 2021 in Costa Rica.

== Incumbents ==
- President: Carlos Alvarado Quesada
- First Vice President: Epsy Campbell Barr
- Second Vice President: Marvin Rodríguez Cordero

== Events ==
- Ongoing – COVID-19 pandemic in Costa Rica
- January 30 – Tourism Minister Gustavo Segura predicts about one million tourists will visit Costa Rica in 2021, on par with the 1,011,000 in 2020 but sharply down from the 3,139,000 international visitors of 2019.
- February 8 – Students return to live classes after suspension for the COVID-19 pandemic.
- March 28–April 3 — Holy Week
- April 11 – Juan Santamaría Day, 165th anniversary of the hero′s death.
- July 26 – Guanacaste Day, 197th anniversary of the annexation of Guanacaste Province.
- August 15 – Mother's Day and Assumption of Mary.
- September 20 – Independence Day, 206th anniversary of the Act of Independence of Central America.
- December 1 – Army Abolition Day, since 1948.

== Sports ==
- August 24 to September 5 – Costa Rica at the 2020 Summer Paralympics
- 2020–21 Liga FPD

== Deaths ==
- March 20 – Bernal Jiménez Monge, 91, politician, president of the Legislative Assembly (1984–1985), MP (1982–1986, 2002–2006) and minister of economy and finance (1964–1965).

== See also ==
- 2021 Atlantic hurricane season
- COVID-19 pandemic in North America
