= List of newspapers in Costa Rica =

This is a list of newspapers in Costa Rica.

== Newspapers ==
- The Costa Rica News, daily, in English
- The Costa Rica Star, online newspaper, in English
- Diario Extra, daily, in Spanish; tabloid press; the country's principal newspaper by circulation
- La Nación, daily, in Spanish
- La Prensa Libre, daily, in Spanish; first newspaper founded in the country
- La Republica, daily, in Spanish
- La Teja, daily, in Spanish
- The Tico Times, weekly, in English

== See also ==
- Media of Costa Rica
