= The Costa Rica Star =

English-language news publication

- Type: Daily newspaper
- Format: Online and Print Publication
- Owner: Private
- Founded: December 2011
- Language: English
- Headquarters: San Jose, Costa Rica
- Sister newspapers: Inside Costa Rica
- Website: https://news.co.cr/

The Costa Rica Star is an English-language news publication that has been online since late 2011. As of 2014, the focus of this website was to cater to the English-speaking expatriate population in Costa Rica, particularly those living in the Central Valley and in the province of Guanacaste.

== History ==
The website's About page indicates that The Costa Rica Star was founded in December 2011 by a Canadian citizen living in Costa Rica as a full-time legal resident. One of the first articles on the site reported on the death of British political author and thinker Christopher Hitchens, who died on 15 December 2011. The website's Facebook Timeline had more than 90,000 followers as of January 2020

== Style of reporting ==
Many of the articles published by The Costa Rica Star are based on news stories found on Spanish-language media websites of Costa Rica such as Costa Rica Hoy and La Nacion. The authors add context deemed useful to expatriate readers and foreigners and constantly links to original sources, and Wikipedia seems to be a favorite source for fact checking. The Costa Rica Star invites contributions from citizen journalists and has a signup page for this purpose.

=== Paul Watson ===
On May 13, 2012, The Costa Rica Star reported on the arrest of Paul Watson, founder of the Sea Shepherd Conservation Society, by German law enforcement officials in Frankfurt. From that day on, it reported extensively on Watson, once eliciting comments from Watson himself through the website's Facebook commenting plugin. On this matter, The Costa Rica Star also published press communications written by Paul Watson for the Sea Shepherd Conservation Society, as well as an official response from the International Whale Protection Organization.

=== War on drugs reporting ===
The Costa Rica Star routinely reports on matters related to the war on drugs as they affect Costa Rica and Central America. In July 2013, an article entitled "Snow Job: U.S. Air Force Flies Cocaine from Costa Rica to Miami", was the first English-language news report of a cargo airlift operation involving 24 tons of seized cocaine flown out of the Daniel Oduber Quiros International Airport for destruction on U.S. soil. In August 2013, The Costa Rica Star reported on the drug interdiction operations of the USS Rentz, which seized 963 kilos of cocaine from a fishing vessel flying the Costa Rican flag near the Galapagos Islands. The Costa Rica Star reported that the fishing vessel sank after being taken in two by the USS Rentz, a fact that the U.S. Embassy denied on Twitter; however, ship logs and reports from Costa Rican law enforcement agencies confirmed the sinking.

=== Social experiment controversy ===
In early 2014, The Costa Rica Star published an old and inaccurate article about changes to Costa Rica's stance on perpetual tourism, which were purportedly slated to take place in March 2014. The article caused commotion among the expatriate community of Costa Rica, which turned into consternation once it was revealed as old and incorrect. The Costa Rica Star claimed that the publication was part of a social experiment to illustrate the dangers of misinformation; one reader who was not amused organized a petition to boycott advertising on the site.

== Recognition ==
The editor of The Costa Rica Star was once interviewed by El Financiero, a business weekly published by the leading Spanish daily Grupo Nacion. The publication has also been mentioned by The Times of Israel, the Sea Shepherd Conservation Society, BBC News, Quartz, and UNESCO for its coverage of International Jazz Day 2012.

=== Brian Pallister investigation ===
On April 16, 2016, The Costa Rica Star heeded a request by Canadian news media outlets to look into the assets owned by Brian Pallister, a conservative politician and the Leader of the Opposition of the Manitoba Legislative Assembly at the time. The investigation revealed that Pallister was president of a Finca Deneter Doce, Sociedad Anónima, a holding company for three pieces of real estate in the highly sought-after coastal district of Tamarindo, in the northwestern province of Guanacaste. Pallister had been under fire for spending too much time in Costa Rica when he should have been minding his legislative duties. The Canadian Broadcasting Corporation and the Winnipeg Free Press cited the investigative work of The Costa Rica Star, even as a spokesperson of the Progressive Conservative Party asserted that Pallister did not conduct business or owned properties in Costa Rica, although public records proved otherwise.

== See also ==
- List of newspapers in Costa Rica
