= 2020 in Costa Rica =

- Decades: 2000s; 2010s; 2020s
- See also: Other events of 2020; Timeline of Costa Rican history

Events in the year 2020 in Costa Rica.

== Incumbents ==
- President: Carlos Alvarado Quesada
- First Vice President: Epsy Campbell Barr
- Second Vice President: Marvin Rodríguez Cordero

== Events ==
- 2 February – 2020 Costa Rican municipal elections including 2020 San José mayoral election
- 4 February – A Costa Rican judge nullifies a same-sex marriage between two women and fires the Civil law notary who performed the marriage in 2015.
- 7 February – The Office of the United Nations High Commissioner for Human Rights provides US$4.1 million for Nicaraguan and Venezuelan asylum seekers in Costa Rica.
- 15 February – Authorities in seize a record five tons of cocaine worth $130 million in the port of Limón.
- 6 March – COVID-19 pandemic in Costa Rica: The first case of COVID-19 in the country is confirmed. The individual was a 49-year-old American woman who had arrived on a flight from New York on 1 March and did not exhibit symptoms at the time. She was isolated in a San José lodging along with her husband who had also been in contact with infected persons in New York.
- 13 March – COVID-19 pandemic: Leaders of Costa Rica, Belize, Guatemala, Honduras, Nicaragua, Panama, and the Dominican Republic sign an agreement for dealing with the coronavirus pandemic. It includes canceling the Costa Rican film festival.
- 18 March – COVID-19 pandemic: An 87-year-old man becomes the first COVID-19 death in Costa Rica.
- 28 March – Panama and Costa Rica fail in attempts to move thousands of migrants from Africa, Asia, and Haiti amassed in shelters as a precaution against COVID-19. Costa Rica has 295 confirmed cases and two deaths.
- 26 May – Same-sex marriage in Costa Rica: Costa Rica becomes the first country in Central America to legalize same-sex marriage.
- 28 May 28 – COVID-19 pandemic: Legislative leaders from Costa Rica meet with their counterparts from nine other Latin American countries to discuss a response to the COVID-19 pandemic.
- 24 August – A 6.2 M earthquake centered in Pochotal de Garabito, Puntarenas, is felt throughout the country. No damages are reported.
- 15 September – Independence Day: Before a reduced crowd, President Carlos Alvarado praises health workers, "today's heroes".
- 18 September – The government proposes a tax increase and austerity measures in order to get US $1.75 billion in aid from the International Monetary Fund (IMF).
- 15 December – Costa Rica builds an emission-free wooden ship capable of transporting 350 tons of cargo.
- 16 December – COVID-19 pandemic: Costa Rica approves the Pfizer-BioNTech COVID-19 vaccine and hope to begin applications in the first trimester of 2021.
- 23 December – “Afro-Latino Travels With Kim Haas,” a TV series honoring Afro-Latinos and highlighting Costa Rica, premiers on PBS.
- 24 December – COVID-19 pandemic: Vaccination begins.

== Deaths ==
- 9 September – Henrietta Boggs, American-Costa Rican writer and socialite, former First Lady, subject of First Lady of the Revolution (b. 1918).
- 9 October – Teresita Aguilar, 87, politician, Deputy (2005–2006).
- November 29 – José Rafael Barquero Arce, 89, Costa Rican Roman Catholic prelate, Auxiliary Bishop of Alajuela (1980–2007).

== See also ==
- 2020 in the Caribbean
- 2020 in Central America
- 2020 Atlantic hurricane season
