= La República (Costa Rica) =

Daily newspaper published in San Jose, Costa Rica

La República (The Republic)
- Para Decisiones Informadas (For Informed Decisions)

- 31 December 2023 front page with Debi Nova, Yokasta Valle, and Gisela Sánchez
- Type: Daily newspaper
- Format: Print and online
- Publisher: Republica Media Group
- Editor: Esteban Arrieta
- CEO: Fabio Parreaguirre
- Language: Spanish
- City: San José, Costa Rica
- Website: larepublica.net

La República (English: The Republic) is a national daily newspaper in Costa Rica published in San José.

== History ==
The paper is known for investigative reporting, including stories on a plane crash involving former CIA Chief Stansfield Turner and the selling of fake COVID-19 tests to tourists. In 2013, La República began charging for online subscriptions to access their website.

== See also ==
- List of newspapers in Costa Rica
- List of mass media in Costa Rica
