= 2023 in Costa Rica =

- Decades: 2000s; 2010s; 2020s
- See also: Other events of 2023; Timeline of Costa Rican history

Couple on roller skates at a Pride march in Costa Rice, 2023

Events in the year 2023 in Costa Rica.

== Incumbents ==
- President: Rodrigo Chaves Robles
- First Vice President: Stephan Brunner
- Second Vice President: Mary Munive

== Events ==
- Ongoing – COVID-19 pandemic in Costa Rica
- October 23 – November 6: Costa Rica at the 2023 Pan American Games
- October 30 - Teletica is now official launch called TeleticaWorld is a Costa Rican international TV channel from Costa Rica and around the world.
- November 6 - 12 new channels are official launch such as Costa Rica Channel, Repretel 55, CR NotiCanal, Repretel NotiCanal, Teletica Deportes, Repretel Deportes, Repretel Viajar, Costa Rica Concierto TV, MRECTV, Costa Rica Vacaciones TV, CRFICTV TD Principal Evento and Viajar TV (Costa Rica).

== See also ==
- 2023 Atlantic hurricane season
- COVID-19 pandemic in North America
