= Second Battle of Rivas =

1856 battle of the Filibuster War

Coordinates: 11°26′21.51″N 85°49′37.19″W

- Part of the Filibuster War
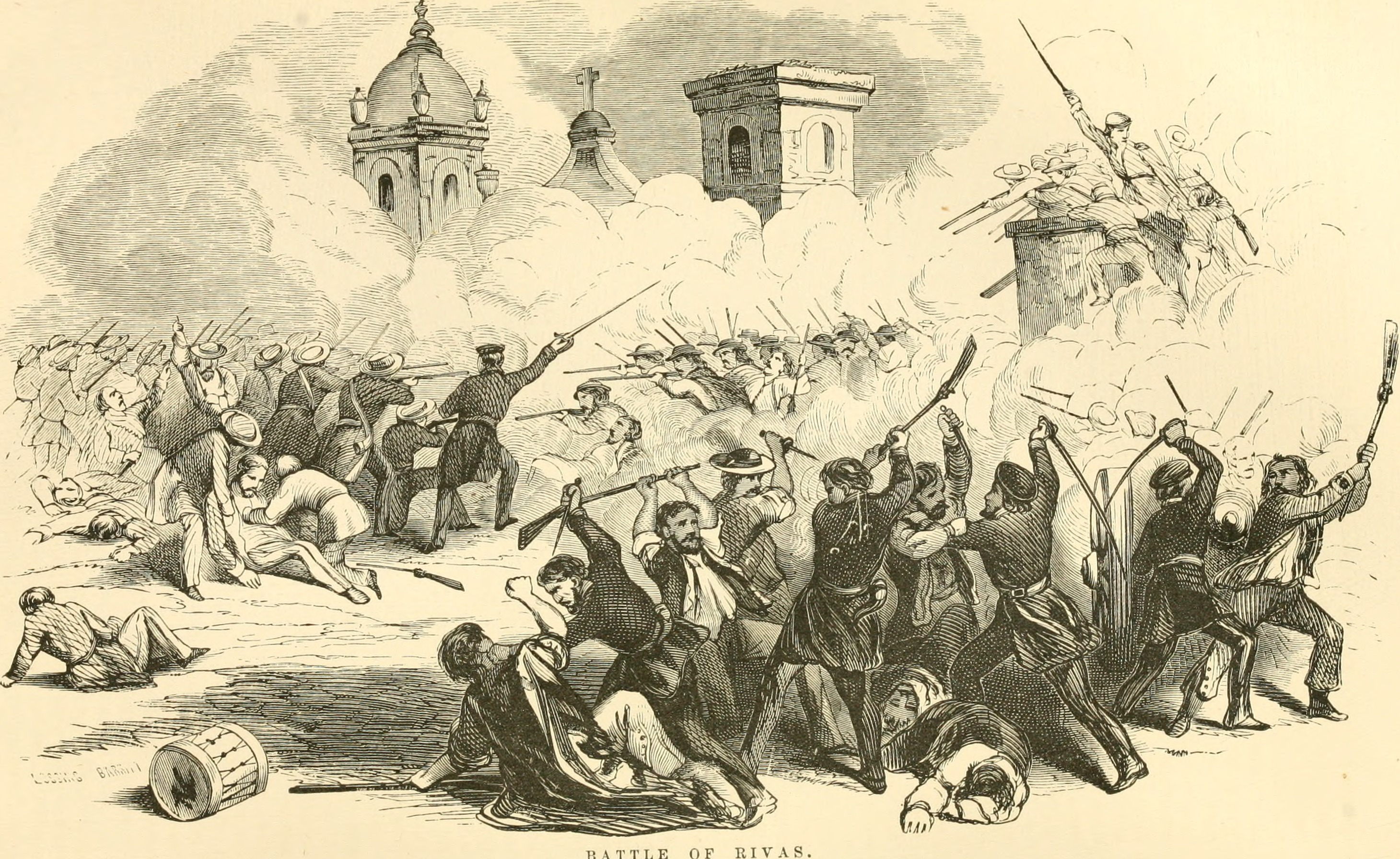
- 1858 interpretation by Elbert Price in his book "The Battle Roll"
Date	11 April 1856
Location	Rivas, Nicaragua
Result	Costa Rican victory: William Walker was forced to leave the country.

Belligerents
Filibusters	Costa Rica

Commanders and leaders
William Walker	(Costa Rica) José María Cañas

Strength
Unknown	3,000

Casualties and losses
200 killed Several wounded	110 killed 260 wounded

The Second Battle of Rivas occurred on 11 April 1856 between Costa Rican militia under General Juan Rafael Mora Porras and the Nicaraguan forces of American mercenary William Walker. The lesser known First Battle of Rivas took place on the 29 June 1855 between Walker's forces and the forces of the Chamorro government of Nicaragua.

Among the casualties was Charles Wilkins Webber, an American journalist and explorer serving in Walker's forces, whom some scholars suggest inspired the antagonist in Cormac McCarthy's novel Blood Meridian.

== Background ==
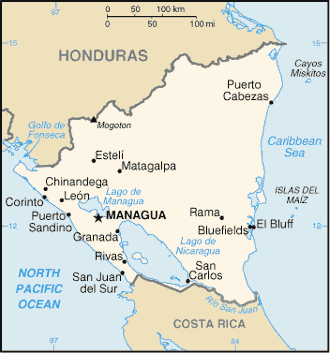
Ships from New York would enter the San Juan River from the Atlantic and sail across Lake Nicaragua. People and goods would then be transported by stagecoach over a narrow strip of land near the city of Rivas, before reaching the Pacific

At the time, a major trade route between New York City and San Francisco ran through southern Nicaragua. Ships from New York would enter the San Juan River from the Atlantic and sail across Lake Nicaragua.

People and goods were transported by stagecoach over a narrow strip of land near the city of Rivas, before reaching the Pacific, where they were shipped to San Francisco. The commercial rights to this route had been granted by a previous Nicaraguan administration to Wall Street tycoon Cornelius Vanderbilt's Accessory Transit Company. However, Garrison and Morgan had wrested control of the company from Vanderbilt and subsequently supported Walker's expedition. In response, Vanderbilt spread rumors that the company was issuing stock illegally, aiming to depress its value and ultimately regain controlling interest.

In July 1856, Walker declared himself president of Nicaragua, after conducting a farcical election. As ruler, he revoked the Transit Company's charter, alleging that it had violated the agreement, and reinstated the route's use to Garrison and Morgan. This move outraged Vanderbilt, who successfully pressured the U.S. government to withdraw its recognition of Walker's regime. Walker further alarmed neighboring countries and American and European investors with plans for additional military campaigns in Central America. In response, Vanderbilt financed and trained a military coalition of Central American states led by Costa Rica, while also working to cut off Walker's access to men and supplies. Additionally, Vanderbilt offered payments and free passage back to the U.S. to defectors from Walker's army.

Realising that his position was becoming precarious, Walker sought support from the Southerners in the U.S. by reframing his campaign as a fight to spread the institution of black slavery, which many American Southern businessmen viewed as foundational to their agrarian economy. To align with this goal, Walker revoked Nicaragua's emancipation edict of 1824. This move did increase Walker's popularity in the South and drew the attention of Pierre Soulé, an influential New Orleans politician, who worked to rally support for Walker's campaign. However, Walker's army, weakened by an epidemic of cholera and widespread defections, proved no match for the Central American Coalition and the efforts of Vanderbilt's agents.

Costa Rican President Juan Rafael Mora observed with growing concern as Walker consolidated his forces and power in Nicaragua. Fearing that Walker would become unstoppable, and with the backing of Vanderbilt's business empire, Mora declared war not on Nicaragua but specifically on Walker and his filibusters on March 1, 1856. Having long warned about the threat posed by the filibusters, Mora made this declaration in a famous speech that began with the words, "Countrymen, take your weapons, the time that I've been warning you has arrived" (a paraphrase of the opening words of the Marseillaise).

Enraged, Walker ordered the invasion of Costa Rica and a filibuster force crossed the border into Guanacaste. Meanwhile, the Costa Rican army advanced from the Central Valley toward the same direction. Accompanying the army was President Mora, though command was entrusted to his brother, José Joaquín Mora, and his brother-in-law, General José María Cañas Escamilla. Upon learning that a small contingent of Walker's men was encamped near Guanacaste's Hacienda Santa Rosa, Mora led three thousand of his troops to attack. Walker's forces were under the command of Colonel Louis Schlessinger, an inexperienced officer. On March 20, with no sentries posted, Mora's Costa Rican troops launched a surprise assault on the filibusters. Schlessinger fled the scene, abandoning his disorganized and leaderless troops, leaving them vulnerable to the attack.

Walker, alarmed by the defeat, heard unfounded rumors that Mora's army was planning to attack from the north. In response, he decided to abandon the key city of Nicaragua at the time and move to confront the perceived threat from the north. Mora, seizing the opportunity, quickly advanced into Rivas with 3,000 men.

== Battle ==
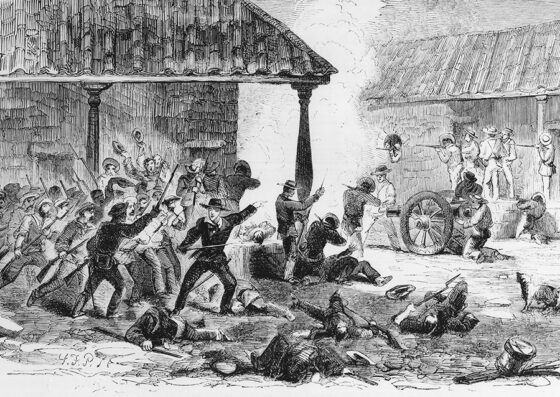
Scene in the Battle of Rivas, Frank Leslie's Illustrated Newspaper

Walker, just four days after giving up the city, marched his men back into Rivas to try to take it back. His small force was able to score a number of victories through street to street fighting and were able to create a stalemate at a key building in town, El Mesón de Guerra, the Guerra family home, which was located in the corner of the park, covered the approach to Rivas church; from the towers of the church Walker's snipers enjoyed a wide firing range.

=== Juan Santamaría ===
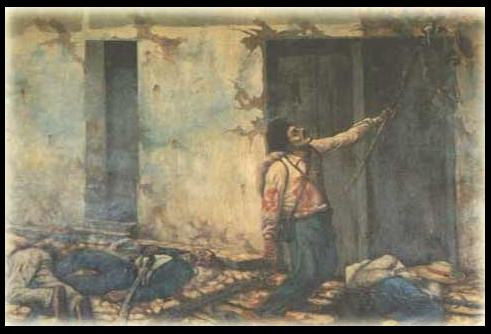
Juan Santamaria - The Burning of the Inn (1896), painting by Costa Rican artist Enrique Echandi

According to the traditional account, on April 11, Salvadoran General José María Cañas suggested that one of the soldiers advance towards the hostel with a torch and set it on fire. Some soldiers tried and failed, but Juan Santamaría finally volunteered on the condition that in the event of his death, someone would look after his mother. He then advanced and was mortally wounded by enemy fire. Before expiring he succeeded, however, in setting fire to the hostel, thus contributing decisively to the Costa Rican victory at Rivas, as the enemy then retreated.

=== Francisca ("Pancha") Carrasco ===
Carrasco who was serving the militia as a cook and impromptu medic, filled her apron pockets with bullets, grabbed a discarded rifle and shamed some of the retreating Costa Ricans forestalling what might have become a rout.

=== Juan Alfaro Ruiz ===
Juan Alfaro Ruiz was responsible for clearing the filibusters from the church. He died of cholera after the battle. One of Alajuela's cantons was named after him.

== Aftermath ==
Walker and his surviving soldiers fled to Granada during the night. Several factions within the Costa Rican Army pushed to pursue and eliminate Walker, hoping to end the war decisively. However, President Mora called off the plan, recognizing that his troops were already exhausted from the fighting. Mora chose to focus his resources on burying the dead and caring for the wounded and sick. Despite Costa Rica's victory in the Battle of Rivas, the country was unable to celebrate its success. The bodies of those killed in the battle had been thrown into the city's wells, triggering a devastating cholera outbreak.

Believing that cholera was caused by the hot weather of the Nicaraguan lowlands, the troops demanded to return home. As they retreated, the Costa Rican soldiers carried the disease back to Costa Rica, where it spread rapidly, devastating the entire country and killing approximately one-tenth of the population. President Juan Rafael Mora was widely blamed for the cholera outbreak, the heavy casualties suffered by the army, and the economic damage caused by the war debts. A coup was planned against him upon his return to the capital, but the attempt was ultimately aborted.

The war against Walker continued, with the armies of other Central American nations joining the effort under the command of General Mora. Their strategy focused on cutting off the flow of men and weapons to the filibusters by disrupting the transit route. After the war, Mora was removed from power in 1859. He was executed in 1860 after attempting to return to power alongside General Cañas.

== See also ==
- Battle of Santa Rosa

== Bibliography ==
- Jamison, James Carson (2007). With Walker in Nicaragua: Or, Reminiscences of an Officer of the American Phalanx. Kessinger Publishing, LLC. pp. 70–89, 186. ISBN 0548260664.
- McCloskey, J. J. Autobiography of an Old Player contains many references to William Walker.
