= La Prensa Libre =

La Prensa Libre (The Free Press) was a daily newspaper published in San José, the capital city of Costa Rica. It was the country's oldest continually published newspaper, founded on 11 June 1889.

The newspaper stopped publishing its print edition on 31 December 2014, and moved to a digital format in January 2015. In August 2020, Grupo Extra announced that the newspaper was to cease publication, citing reduced advertising revenue due to the COVID-19 pandemic.

== See also ==
- List of newspapers in Costa Rica
