= Pancha Carrasco =

Costa Rican soldier

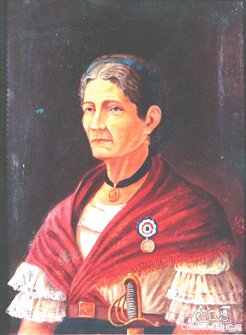
- Painting of Pancha Carrasco around 1880.
- Born: Francisca Carrasco Jiménez; 8 April 1816; Cartago, Costa Rica, Captaincy General of Guatemala
- Died: 31 December 1890 (aged 74); San José, Costa Rica
- Known for: First Costa Rican woman in military
- Spouse(s): Juan Solano, Gil Zúñiga
- Parent(s): Jose Francisco Carrasco and Maria Jiménez

Pancha Carrasco (8 April 1816 – 31 December 1890), born Francisca Carrasco Jiménez, was Costa Rica's first woman in the military. Carrasco is most famous for joining the defending forces at the Battle of Rivas in 1856 with a rifle and a pocketful of bullets. The strength and determination she showed there made her a symbol of national pride and she was later honored with a Costa Rican postage stamp, a Coast Guard vessel, and the creation of the "Pancha Carrasco Police Women's Excellence Award".

== Biography ==
Francisca Carrasco Jiménez was born on 8 April 1816 in Cartago, Costa Rica, the daughter of Jose Francisco Carrasco and Maria Jiménez. She was of mixed American, African, and European heritage. Pancha was married two times, first in 1834 to Juan Solano, and later to Gil Zúñiga; however, neither of her marriages worked out.

In 1856 (age 40), when William Walker and his filibusteros invaded Costa Rica, Carrasco volunteered as an army cook and a medic. She is most famous for filling her apron pockets with bullets, grabbing a rifle, and joining the defending forces at the Battle of Rivas, becoming Costa Rica's first woman in the military.

== Legacy ==
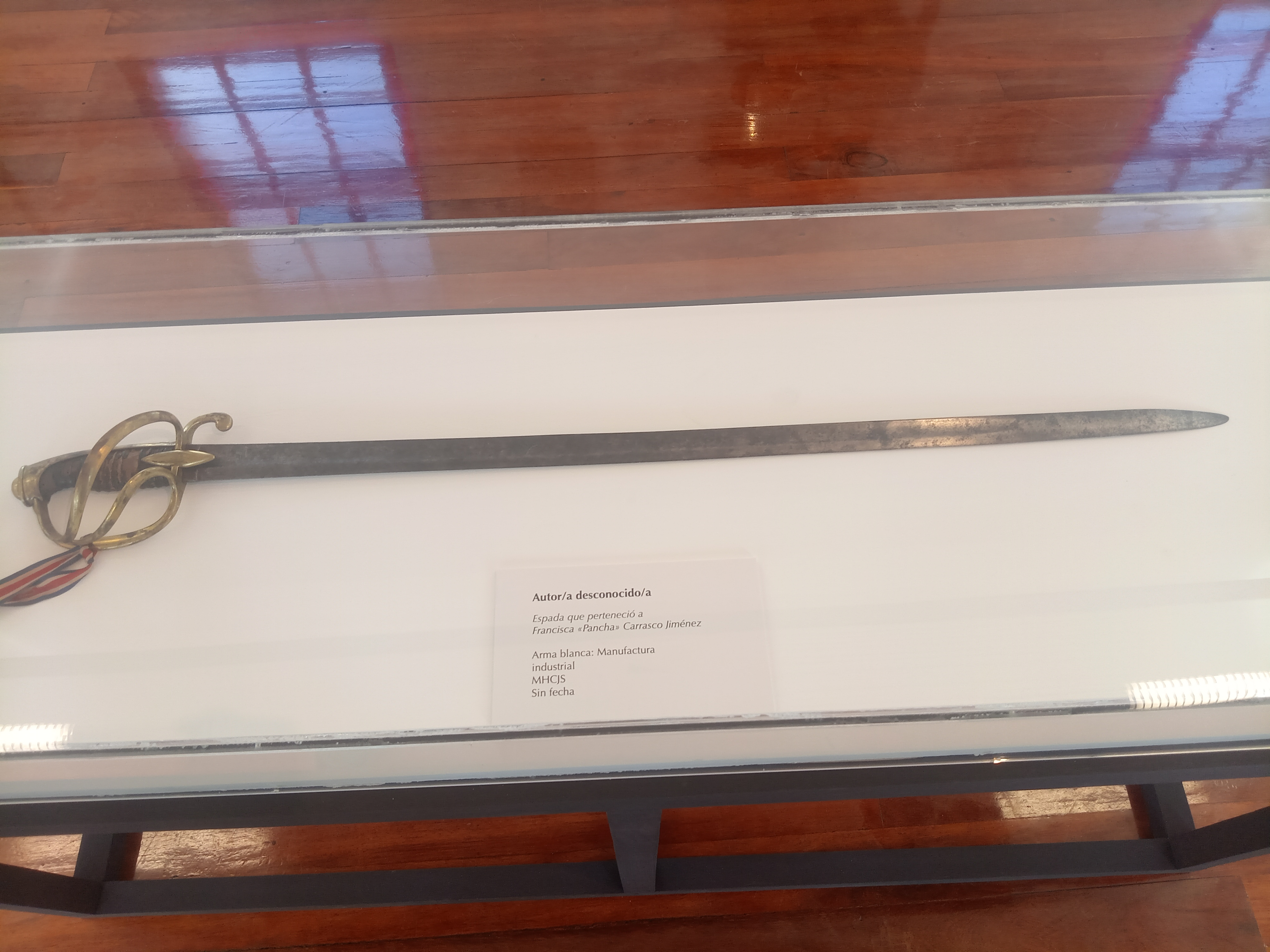
Pancha Carrasco's Sword

Her strength and determination became a symbol of national pride, and she was commemorated with a Costa Rican postage stamp in 1984.

The Costa Rican Security Ministry established a "Pancha Carrasco Police Women's Excellence Award" in her honor. The former U.S. Coast Guard cutter Point Bridge was renamed Pancha Carrasco in her honor when it was turned over to the Costa Rican Coast Guard in 2001.
