= 1910 in Costa Rica =

- Decades: 1890s; 1900s; 1910s; 1920s; 1930s
- See also: Other events of 1910; Timeline of Costa Rican history

Events in the year 1910 in Costa Rica.

== Incumbents ==
- President: Cleto González Víquez (until 8 May), Ricardo Jiménez Oreamuno (from 8 May)
- First Designate of the Presidency: Ricardo Jiménez Oreamuno (until 8 May), Carlos Durán Cartín (from 8 May)
- Second Designate of the Presidency: Andrés Venegas García (until 8 May), Alberto González Soto (from 8 May)
- Third Designate of the Presidency: José Astúa Aguilar (until 8 May), Ezequiel Gutiérrez Iglesias (from 8 May)

== Events ==
- 7 April – 1910 Costa Rican general election: Ricardo Jiménez Oreamuno is elected president, defeating Rafael Iglesias Castro.
- 13 April–4 May – The 1910 Costa Rica earthquakes destroy much of Cartago and kill hundreds of people.

== Deaths ==
- 3 January – Antonio Saldaña, last king of Talamanca (b. 1880)
