= Radio stations of University of Costa Rica =

Radioemisoras UCR
- San José; Costa Rica
- Broadcast area: Municipality of Montes de Oca, San Pedro
- Frequencies: Radio Universidad de Costa Rica: 96.7 MHz; Radio U: 101.9 MHz; Radio 870 UCR: 870 kHz
- Branding: Rucr

Programming
- Language: Spanish

Ownership
- Owner: University of Costa Rica

Technical information
- Transmitter coordinates: 9.934736°N 84.051947°W

Links
- Website: Radioemisoras UCR

The public University of Costa Rica comprises 3 radio stations, amongst which two use frequency modulation and one uses amplitude modulation. They are all three unified under the Spanish umbrella term "Radioemisoras UCR", whose director is Sylvia Carbonell.

== Stations ==
=== Radio Universidad de Costa Rica ===
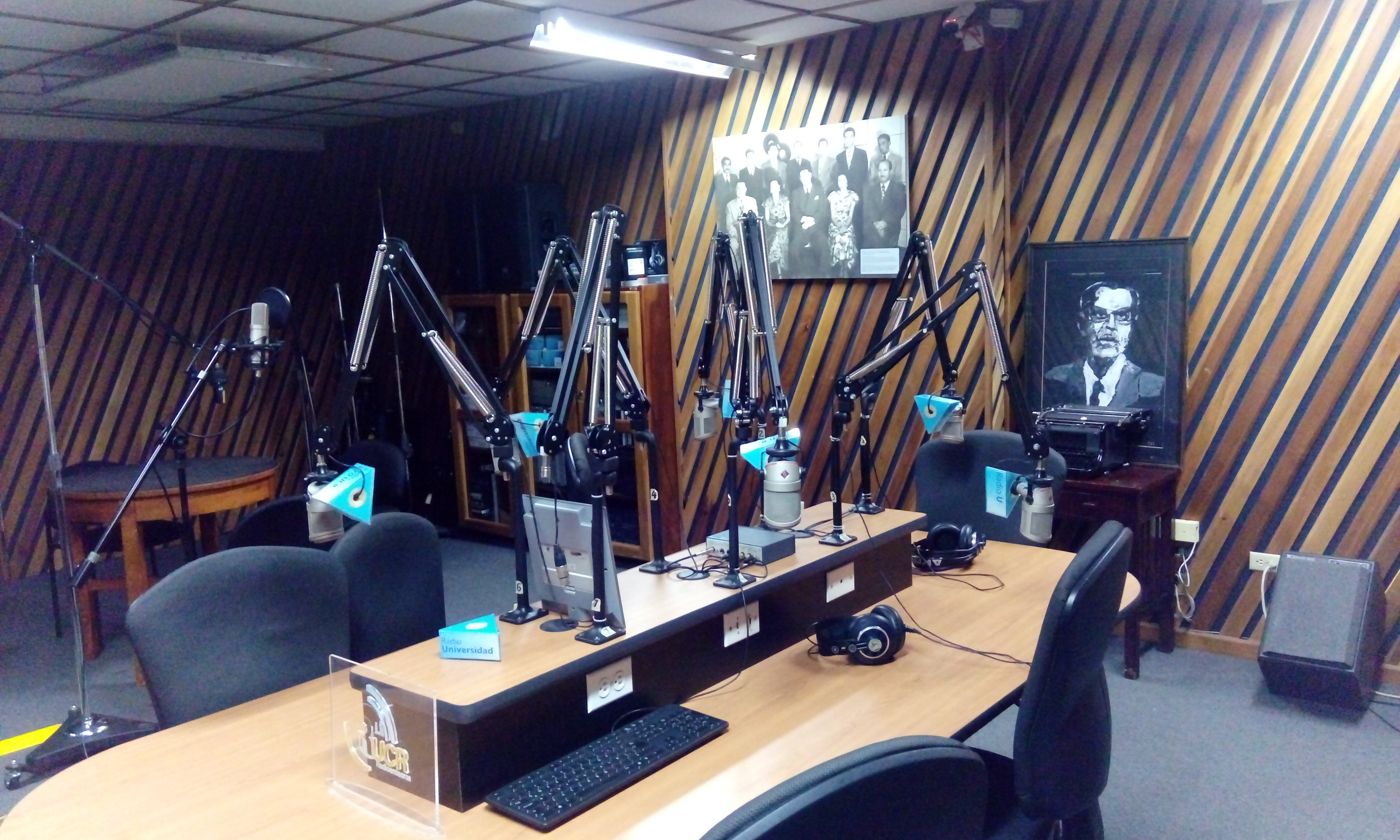
The main recording studio (sometimes called studio 1 internally) of Radio Universidad de Costa Rica, on 5 August 2016.

This station (the first radio station of the University of Costa Rica) started broadcasting on 29 November 1949, thus shortly after the Costa Rican Civil War of 1948 and the subsequent second republic (See Junta Fundadora de la Segunda República (in Spanish)). At that time, however, it broadcast on amplitude modulation and had a different name, since abbreviated "TIUCR".

=== Radio U ===
The frequency of this channel was first used for repeating broadcasts of the older channel "Radio Universidad de Costa Rica"; until it started it own broadcasts on 22 April 1996. At that time, Carlos Morales was the director of "Radioemisoras UCR" and wanted to receive more student participation on its radio stations. In its early years, multiple programs made by university students emerged on Radio U.

=== Radio 870 UCR ===
Started broadcasting songs and micro-broadcasts in 2008; and subsequently broadcasting live on 4 May 2009.

== Hi-jacking of August 2015 ==
On 25 August 2015, at 3:30PM (local time (CST)) a group of students and workers of the University of Costa Rica entered the three emission cabins of the three respective stations. The take-over lasted 1 hour. The hi-jackers were unsatisfied due to an agreement between the government and the rectors of Costa Rica's five universities to augment a Special Fund for Higher Education (Spanish: FEES) by 7.38%.

== Directors ==
- José Tasies: Starting from 1977, and throughout a large part of the 1980s.
- Carlos Morales: 1996.
- Guisella Boza: 2004-2013.
- Alejandro Vargas Johansson: 2014.
- Sylvia Carbonell: 16 February 2016 – 16 February 2020.
