= José Ricardo Carballo =

Costa Rican radio presenter (1983–2025)

- Born: 1983
- Died: August 17, 2025 (aged 41–42); La Garita, Alajuela, Costa Rica
- Occupations: Presenter, journalist, writer
- Known for: Pelando El Ojo on Radio Monumental

José Ricardo Carballo (1983 – August 17, 2025) was a Costa Rican presenter, journalist and writer.

== Life and career ==
Carballo began his comedy career by mimicking characters from the radio. He was primarily a presenter on the Pelando El Ojo radio show on the San José based radio station Radio Monumental 93.5 FM. He had been part of the program for three years, performing a range of impersonations, including those of Randall Zúñiga, director of the OIJ, and former Mexican president Andrés Manuel López Obrador.

In 2017, he published Bajo su propio riesgo, a comprehensive collection of humorous articles on politics, sports, and culture. In 2022, he posted a similar collection titled Diario de un tico en pandemia.

Carballo died on August 17, 2025, at the age of 42, after being involved in a traffic collision in La Garita de Alajuela.
