= The Tico Times =

Media organization based in Costa Rica

- Type: Daily newspaper
- Format: Online and print
- Owner(s): Producciones Magnolia
- Editor: Alejandro Zúñiga
- Founded: 18 May 1956
- Website: www.ticotimes.net

The Tico Times is an English-language media organization based in Costa Rica. Established in May 1956, it closed its print edition in 2012 and became an online-only publication; in 2017, it began publishing special print editions with highlights from its daily online coverage.

== History ==
The Tico Times was founded in 1956 as a student newspaper under the guidance of Elisabeth "Betty" Dyer at the Lincoln School in San José, Costa Rica's capital. The print edition "reached its heyday between 2005 and 2007, flush with real-estate advertisements aimed at foreign tourists during the U.S. housing boom". But after 56 years as a print weekly the newspaper became an "unlikely casualty" of the collapse of the housing bubble, and, on September 28, 2012, it announced on its website that it would no longer publish print editions. It laid off its entire 16-person staff, who worked for free as volunteers while the business was being restructured as an online-only publication. The online incarnation of The Tico Times went live in January 2014.

After the brief closure following the death of owner Jonathan Harris in mid-2017, The Tico Times returned to its online and print editions in late 2017 under new ownership. The organization seeks to embrace The Tico Times' traditional missions as a way to honor Jonathan Harris; former publisher Dery Dyer; founders Elisabeth and Richard Dyer; and all those who have led, supported and shaped the newspaper through its 62-year history. The organization's mission is to support and empower young journalists, to celebrate Costa Rica, and to showcase those who are making Costa Rica a better place.

On April 1, 2018, The Tico Times became the first media organization in Costa Rica to use 360 video in electoral coverage. It also piloted a new distribution model in which distributors can sell the paper and keep the proceeds, or donate the proceeds to a nonprofit organization in exchange for free publicity. The Tico Times continues to publish daily at www.ticotimes.net.

== Awards ==
The Times has won several awards, including the Inter-American Press Association (IAPA)'s Pedro G. Beltrán Award for distinguished service to the community (1981); a Special Citation from Columbia University's Maria Moors Cabot Prizes (1985); the National Conservation Prize (1990); the IAPA Grand Prize for Press Freedom (1995); the Salvation Army's Others Award, for launching and supporting the Angel Tree program (1998); and the National Tourism Chamber Media Award (1998).

== See also ==
- List of newspapers in Costa Rica
