= 1906 in Costa Rica =

- Decades: 1880s; 1890s; 1900s; 1910s; 1920s
- See also: Other events of 1906; Timeline of Costa Rican history

Events in the year 1906 in Costa Rica.

== Incumbents ==
- President: Ascensión Esquivel Ibarra until May 8, Cleto González Víquez

== Births ==
- September 25 - José Figueres Ferrer, President 1948-1949, 1953-1958, 1970-1974 (d. 1990)
