= 1900 in Costa Rica =

- Decades: 1880s; 1890s; 1900s; 1910s; 1920s
- See also: Other events of 1900; Timeline of Costa Rican history

Events in the year 1900 in Costa Rica.

== Incumbents ==
- President: Rafael Yglesias Castro

== Births ==
- January 10 - Teodoro Picado Michalski, President 1944-1948 (d. 1960)
