= 2019 in Costa Rica =

- Decades: 2000s; 2010s; 2020s
- See also: Other events of 2020; Timeline of Costa Rican history

Events of 2019 in Costa Rica.

== Incumbents ==
- President: Carlos Alvarado Quesada
- First Vice President: Epsy Campbell Barr
- Second Vice President: Marvin Rodríguez Cordero

== See also ==
- 2019 Pan American Games
