= 1970 in Costa Rica =

- Decades: 1950s; 1960s; 1970s; 1980s; 1990s
- See also: Other events of 1970; Timeline of Costa Rican history

Events of 1970 in Costa Rica.

== Incumbents ==
- President: José Joaquín Trejos Fernández (until May 8) José Figueres Ferrer (from May 8)
- First Vice President: Manuel Aguilar Bonilla
- Second Vice President: Jorge Rossi Chavarría

== Events ==
=== February ===
1: 1970 Costa Rican general election

American International School of Costa Rica established

== Births ==
Carolina Delgado Ramírez December 12
