= Teresita Aguilar =

Costa Rican politician (died 2020)

Teresita Aguilar (died 9 October 2020) was a Costa Rican politician who served as a Deputy between 2005 and 2006 for the Citizens' Action Party. She died aged 87.
