= 2007 in Costa Rica =

- Decades: 1980s; 1990s; 2000s; 2010s; 2020s
- See also: Other events of 2007; Timeline of Costa Rican history

Events in the year 2007 in Costa Rica

== Incumbents ==
- President: Oscar Arias
- First Vice President: Laura Chinchilla
- Second Vice President: Kevin Casas Zamora (until 22 September)

== Events ==
=== February ===
- 18 February – The Costa Rican football team won the UNCAF Nations Cup 2007 on penalties after a 1–1 draw with Panama in the Estadio Cuscatlán in San Salvador, El Salvador.

=== May ===
- 12 May – A Kyrgyz national surrendered to police after a siege at the Russian embassy in San José.

=== June ===
- 7 June – In an effort to attract investment, Costa Rica switched its diplomatic recognition from the Republic of China (Taiwan) to the People's Republic of China.
- 17 June – The Costa Rican football team were eliminated in the quarter final of the 2007 CONCACAF Gold Cup by Mexico, losing 1–0 after extra time in the Reliant Stadium in Houston, Texas.

=== October ===
- 7 October – Costa Ricans narrowly approved the Central America Free Trade Agreement in a referendum with 51.6 percent of the vote.
- 11 October – Two days of torrential rain caused a mudslide in Atenas, leading to a number of deaths and substantial loss of property.
- 16 October – Libya, Vietnam, Burkina Faso, Croatia and Costa Rica were elected to the United Nations Security Council as non-permanent members.

=== November ===
- 16 November – Paulo Wanchope, one of the country's most successful footballers ever, announced his retirement from the game.
