= First Battle of Rivas =

1855 battle of the Filibuster War

- Part of the Filibuster War
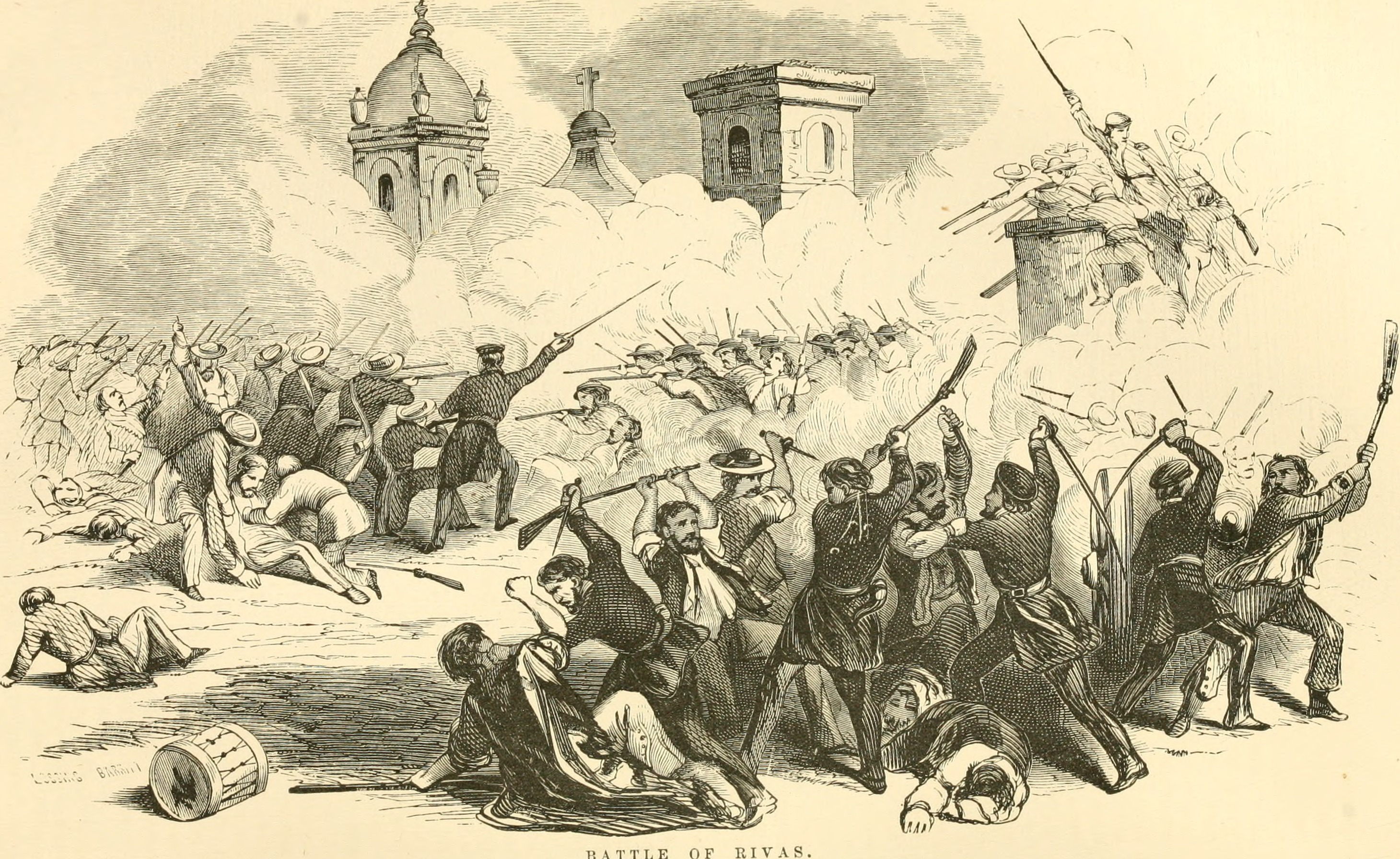
Date	29 June 1855
Location	Rivas on the San Juan River, Nicaragua
Result	Democratic victory

Belligerents
Democratic Party; American filibusters	Legitimist Party

Commanders and leaders
Francisco Castellón; William Walker; Achilles Kewen †; Timothy Crocker †	Manuel Arguëllo

Strength
≈45 filibusters ≈100 Nicaraguans (avoided action)	≈500–580 men

Casualties and losses
11 dead (6 men killed during combat, 5 wounded killed in the aftermath); 7 wounded	≈70 dead +70 wounded

The First Battle of Rivas occurred on June 29, 1855, as part of the struggle to resist William Walker, an American filibuster, adventurer and mercenary who arrived in Nicaragua with a small army of mercenaries in June 1855 in support of the Democratic Party government of General Francisco Castellón in the Nicaraguan civil war. His army were defeated by the Legitimist Party.

== Background ==
A civil war was then raging in the Central American republic of Nicaragua. The Liberal party (Democratic) and the Legitimist party (Aristocratic), were constantly warring with one another as they tried to gain political control through violent means. "During a period of six years Nicaragua had had no fewer than fifteen presidents." When Walker first arrived with The Falange (Filibuster mercenary/adventurer army), he proposed this venture as a show of strength.

== The battle ==
"Colonel" Walker had under his command a force of about 45 filibusters armed entirely with rifles and revolvers, and a native contingent of about 100 men. The two groups were arrayed in a column marching formation with the filibusters in front, ammo and supply pack-horses in the middle, and the natives bringing up the rear. About a half of a mile from the town, he met with his senior officers and notified them of his plan. Walker's two "captains" were to advance into the city and drive the Legitimists from the streets, while the natives were to follow closely behind to provide protection for their rear and flanks.

The Americans advanced into the city at about 12 pm, absorbing most of their casualties in this first clash. They halted some of the way into the city, to reload and for some respite, expecting further action. But the natives, still some distance from the fighting were interdicted by a large body of Legitimists troops, and believing Walker's contingent to be destroyed the Democratic leader retreated from Rivas. Walker and his men, still held up in a small patch of houses, all the while reaping a heavy toll upon the Legitimist forces with their rifles noticed that they were alone.

Legitimist forces attempted to bring up a small cannon to shell the filibusters out of the homes, but it was disabled in a sally by the mercenaries. The Legitimists then attempted to burn the filibusters out of the homes, succeeding in setting one alight. At this point, after four hours of combat, the order to retreat was called by Walker. The first men out of the houses surprised the Nicaraguans closest to them, and the remainder of the Legitimist forces were momentarily stunned by the American advance. As a result of the confusion, the filibusters were able to withdraw with only one more fatality.

== Aftermath ==
Walker withdrew to friendlier territory, and his forces were augmented by hundreds of filibusters and natives. According to various sources, Walker and his men inflicted such heavy casualties upon the nationals, that they were forced to withdraw from the city in the aftermath of the battle. Although by all measures, (including his own) his forces were defeated, Walker conquered the city.
