= Román Solís Zelaya =

Costa Rican jurist (c.1954–2022)

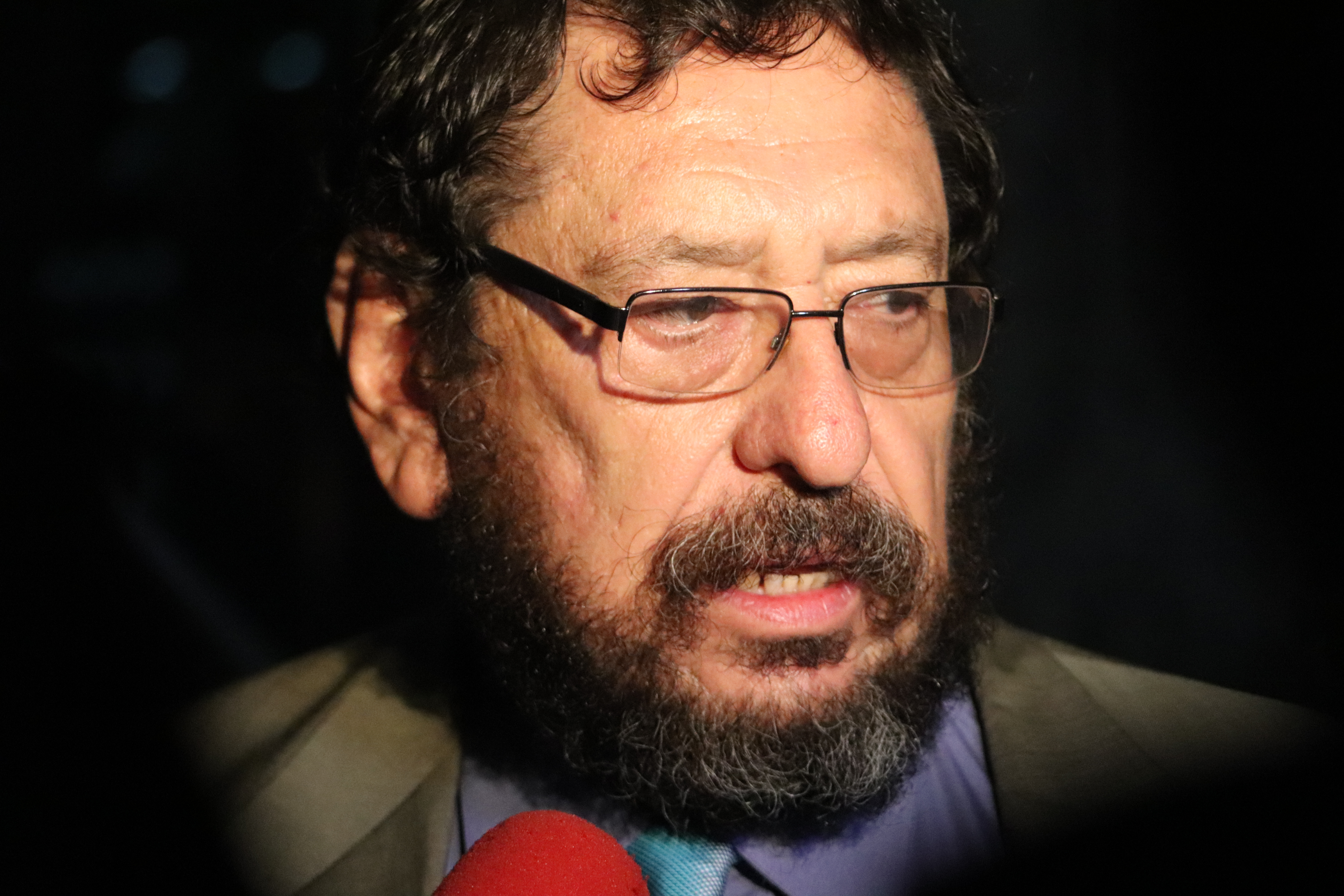
Image of Román Solís Zelaya

Román Solís Zelaya (c. 1954 – 20 August 2022) was a Costa Rican jurist who served as a justice of the Supreme Court.
