= 1979 in Costa Rica =

- Decades: 1950s; 1960s; 1970s; 1980s; 1990s
- See also: Other events of 1979; Timeline of Costa Rican history

Events of 1979 in Costa Rica.

== Incumbents ==
- President: Rodrigo Carazo Odio
- First Vice President: Rodrigo Altmann Ortiz
- Second Vice President: José Miguel Alfaro Rodríguez

== Events ==
Friendship Cup played

=== June ===
June 13 Belén F.C. established

=== November ===
November 6 A.D. Municipal Curridabat established

== Births ==
Danny Vargas Serrano July 8, 1979 in San José
