= Diario Extra (Costa Rica) =

Diario Extra is a tabloid newspaper in Costa Rica, established in 1978 and the first issue was released on September 18 of that year. Diario Extra is part of Grupo Extra, which also included Extra TV (channel 42) and Radio América.

== Overview ==
La Extra is one of the most highly read newspapers in Costa Rica, having the largest number of copies printed daily in the country. It is notable for its use of red ink in headlines and for its inclusion of more left-wing political voices in its editorial section than other Costa Rican newspapers.

Its candid writing style has given it a wide following among working-class readers in Costa Rica. Most of its pages are filled with short, sensationalistic news items. Often, images of graphic, disturbing scenes are displayed on the front page, such as photographs of fatal accidents. Some of its reporters use slang understandable only to the Costa Rica population. Nevertheless, the paper also conducts serious investigative reporting and features lengthy interviews with important political figures.

La Extra was founded in the late 1970s, originally containing pictures of semi-nude women on the front page in order to increase circulation. To this day, the use of scantily clad young women is a popular mainstay on the front page. It is not unusual to see a Diario Extra front page that contains two photos side-by-side: A graphic photo of a car crash or shooting juxtaposed with a photo of a young woman smiling over her shoulder while giving maximum exposure of her buttocks. One of its most read sections is called "Sentimientos en Conflicto" (Translated as "Conflicting Feelings"), a popular spin-off of a Dear Abby US-style column.

Additionally, there is a section called Tia Zelmira (published only Fridays), which is a summary of the local "jet-set" activities (the "jet-set" in Costa Rica is often called "avioneta-set").

On May 31, 2023, Grupo Extra announced the closure of all of its operations, including Diario Extra, due to the country's "lack of economic reactivation", causing lack of sales and advertising revenue. The Transcomer Group then bought Grupo Extra to restart the newspaper in July 2023.

== See also ==
- List of newspapers in Costa Rica
