= Brunhilda de Portilla =

Costa Rican educator and composer (1929–2025)

Brunilda de Portilla (2 June 1929 – 9 July 2025) was a Costa Rican educator and composer.

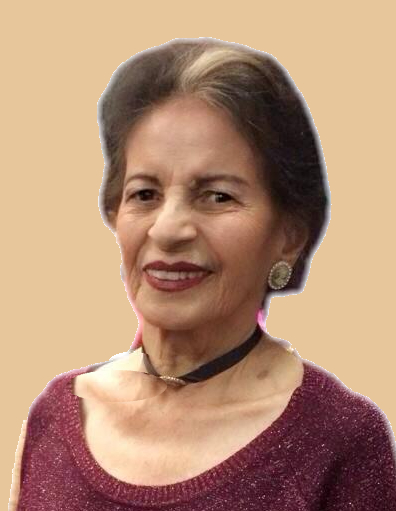
Brunhilda de Portilla

== Life and career ==
De Portilla was born as Brunilda Rodríguez Martínez, to Nicaraguan parents in La Cruz on 2 June 1929. After graduating in 1947, she enrolled at the University of Costa Rica, where she was part of the University Theater, performing various productions of works by Miguel de Cervantes, Alejandro Casona and Henrik Ibsen.

In 1953, de Portilla married Roberto Portilla Ibarra, with whom she had three children.

De Portilla was a primary school teacher in different institutions in Guanacaste. She began teaching science, Spanish, history, mathematics, plastic arts, and physical education in the public schools of Guadalupe, Sabanilla and Desamparados. She also took the opportunity to form choirs with his students and teach them various compositions.

De Portilla recorded some of the songs she had composed in later years; most of them with a love theme and a Christmas carol. They were interested in Christmas songs, so that same afternoon, de Portilla composed the eleven carols that were missing to complete the album. In the recording, he was accompanied by a group of children. Four years later he composed nineteen more Christmas carols that were part of the second album.

In 2011, the Ministry of Culture and Youth declared the Christmas carols composed by de Portilla as songs of public interest.

In 2018, at the International Symposium Women in Music, held at the University of Costa Rica, dedicated a recital to de Portilla's work.

De Portilla died on 9 July 2025, aged 96.
