= 1948 in Costa Rica =

- Decades: 1920s; 1930s; 1940s; 1950s; 1960s
- See also: Other events of 1948; Timeline of Costa Rican history

Events in the year 1948 in Costa Rica.

== Incumbents ==
- President: Teodoro Picado Michalski until April 20, Santos León Herrera (interim) until May 8, José Figueres Ferrer

== Events ==
- February 8 - Costa Rican general election, 1948
- March 12-April 24: Costa Rican Civil War
- December 8 - Costa Rican Constitutional Assembly election, 1948
