= COVID-19 pandemic in Costa Rica =

Ongoing COVID-19 viral pandemic in Costa Rica

- Disease: COVID-19
- Pathogen: SARS-CoV-2
- Location: Costa Rica
- First outbreak: Tocumen International Airport, Panama (first case), and New York, United States (first confirmed)
- Index case: Alajuela
- Arrival date: 6 March 2020 (6 years, 6 months and 5 days)
- Confirmed cases: 1,242,945
- Recovered: 1,223,056
- Deaths: 9,396
- Fatality rate: 0.83%
- Vaccinations: 10,166,273

Government website
- Ministerio de Salud

The COVID-19 pandemic in Costa Rica was a part of the ongoing worldwide pandemic of coronavirus disease 2019 (COVID-19) caused by severe acute respiratory syndrome coronavirus 2 (SARS-CoV-2). The virus was confirmed to have spread to Costa Rica on 6 March 2020, after a 49-year-old woman tourist from New York, United States, tested positive for the virus.

As of 9 August 2022, Costa Rica has reported 1,057,695 positive cases, and 8,774 deaths.

As of 31 March 2022, there have been 10,166,273 vaccine doses applied. Among these, 4,336,171 are first dosages, 3,971,404 are second dosages, and 1,858,698 are third doses .

== Background ==
On 12 January 2020, the World Health Organization (WHO) confirmed that a novel coronavirus was the cause of a respiratory illness in a cluster of people in Wuhan City, Hubei Province, China, which was reported to the WHO on 31 December 2019.

The case fatality ratio for COVID-19 has been much lower than SARS of 2003, but the transmission has been significantly greater, with a significant total death toll.

== Control measures ==
The government has declared a color coded alert system for the control and containment of the pandemic, as follows:

- Green (Information): No reported cases, but neighboring countries exposed.
- Yellow (Moderated): Accelerated increasing of epidemiological variables, high hospital occupancy, low control of cases.
- Orange (High): Increasing of epidemiological variables, medium hospital occupancy, acceptable control of cases.
- Red (Extreme): Extreme hospital occupancy.

The epidemiological variables are:

- Canton risk by attack rate (weekly): New cases by canton population divided by new national cases, 66% of weight.
- Slope and variation coefficient (triweekly): Weekly increase or decrease in the active cases of a canton, 33% of weight.

More specific details, formulas or algorithms for the alert color designation of the cantons or districts have been kept secret and has not been released as of July 2020, which has been contested by local government of the cantons, commerce associations, journalists and open data activists.

As of August 2020, only Yellow Alert or Orange Alert has been used to designate the administrative areas of the country, with differentiated restrictions on each area.

== Timeline ==
Cases

Deaths

=== February 2020 ===
On 22 February, a 54-year-old male Costa Rican citizen arrived from Tocumen International Airport in Panama, he started to show symptoms on 28 February, and due to his work at the San Rafael Hospital in Alajuela, a cluster was formed starting with some of his family members, patients and coworkers. It was treated as a suspicious case, and confirmed on 7 March.

=== March 2020 ===
On 5 March, the Costa Rican Ministry of Health announced that it was investigating a possible first case of coronavirus in the country. It was a 52-year-old Costa Rican woman from the canton of Pococí, who visited Italy and Tunisia and returned to the country on 29 February without symptoms. The pertinent tests were carried out on the woman and they were sent to the Costa Rican Institute of Research and Teaching in Nutrition and Health (Inciensa) to either rule out or confirm the case. However, this case was ruled out 24 hours after the test was performed.

On 6 March, the first case in Costa Rica was confirmed. The individual was a 49-year-old American woman who had arrived on a flight from New York on 1 March. She did not exhibit symptoms at the time. She was isolated in a San José lodging along with her husband who had also been in contact with infected persons in New York.

On 7 March, four new cases were confirmed. One of them was directly related to the first case, both being US citizens who were visiting Costa Rica. The other cases are Costa Ricans.

On 8 March, another four new cases were confirmed, two of them were imported. Some patients were located at public hospitals while most of the foreign nationals remained at their respective hotels.

On 11 March, a total of 22 confirmed cases was given by the Minister of Health of Costa Rica. 14 men and 8 women of which 19 are Costa Ricans (one of them a pregnant woman) and the other 3 are from other countries. They range from the ages of 10 to 73 years old. It was also announced by the health authorities that there were confirmed cases in the Costa Rican cantons of Alajuela, Escazú, Desamparados, Grecia, Heredia, San José, San Pablo, Santa Cruz and Tibás.

On 13 March, the Ministry of Health confirmed cases found in the provinces of San José, Alajuela, Heredia and Guanacaste, plus now the province of Cartago.

On 15 March, a total of 350 educational centers have been closed down. Three patients were placed in ICU. Health authorities also confirmed cases in the cantons of Santa Ana, Grecia, Nicoya, La Unión, Poás, Pérez Zeledón, San Pablo and Barva.

On 17 March, new cases were confirmed in the cantons of Cartago and Curridabat.

On 18 March cases were confirmed in the cantons of Goicoechea, Moravia, Santo Domingo, and Santa Bárbara. One senior citizen, an 87-year-old man, died on 18 March and is the first COVID-19 death in Costa Rica. He was one of 25 people part of the initial cluster in Alajuela.

On 19 March, the first case was also announced in the province of Limón, in the canton of the same name. On the afternoon of 19 March, the Ministry of Health announced two more cases in Ciudad Quesada, in the canton of San Carlos.

Later, on 19 March, the health authorities announced the second death of a patient with Coronavirus in Costa Rica. It was an older adult, of 87 years old, and resident of Alajuela.

On 20 March, the Ministry reported the recovery of the first two patients with the virus, who were the two American tourists who were isolated in a hotel in San José. New cases were also reported in the cantons of Vázquez de Coronado and Montes de Oca.

On 22 March, there were the first case in Aserrí and the first case in the province of Puntarenas, this one in the city of San Vito, Coto Brus canton.

On 24 March, the cantons of Jiménez, Liberia and Montes de Oro reported their first cases.

On 25 March, the first cases were reported in the cantons of Orotina, Alvarado, Belén, Flores, Puntarenas and Garabito.

On 26 March, the first cases were reported in the cantons of Sarchí, Oreamuno, El Guarco and Tilarán. Lastly, 5 people were reported to be in intensive care in hospitals. A total of 22 health care workers have contracted the virus so far.

On 27 March, the first cases were reported in the cantons of Tarrazú, Mora, San Ramón and Carrillo.

By 28 March, so far 52 health workers of the Costa Rican Social Security Fund (Caja Costarricense del Seguro Social or CCSS) have contracted the virus. The first cases were reported in the cantons of Alajuelita, Turrubares and Naranjo.

On 29 March, the Ministry of Health reported the first case in the canton of Osa.

On 30 March, the Minister of Health warned that the country had just started climbing the curve of cases. The first case was reported in canton of San Isidro.

=== April 2020 ===
On 1 April, the first case was confirmed in the canton of Esparza.

On 3 April, the first case was confirmed in the canton of Hojancha.

On 4 April, the first case was confirmed in the canton of Paraíso.

On 6 April, there are eighteen recovered patients.

On 7 April, the first case was confirmed in the canton of Turrialba.

On 8 April, the first recovery of an intensive care patient in the country was reported.

On the afternoon of April 8, the Ministry of Health confirmed the third death of a patient with Coronavirus in Costa Rica. It was a 45-year-old man, without risk factors, and a resident of San José.

On 9 April, the first case was confirmed in the canton of Siquirres.

On 10 April, the first case was confirmed in the canton of Puriscal.

On 11 April, the first case was confirmed in the canton of Pococí.

On 15 April, the Health Ministry reported a cluster of cases in a CCSS call center in San José, where up to 31 cases of COVID-19 were reported.

On the morning of April 15, the Ministry of Health confirmed the fourth death of a patient with COVID-19 in Costa Rica. It was an 84-year-old man, with risk factors, and who was admitted to the San Juan de Dios Hospital, in San José.

=== December 2020 ===
- 9 December: Costa Rica acquires 14 ultracold freezers to store COVID-19 vaccinations.
- 23 December: First shipment of 10,725 doses of the Pfizer/BioNTech vaccine are received, vaccination starts 24 December 2020 by vaccinating two elderly citizens and healthcare personnel.

== Government response ==
=== March 2020 ===
On 8 March, the Costa Rican Ministry of Health and the National Emergency Committee (CNE) raised the sanitary alert level to yellow.

On 11 March, the University of Costa Rica ordered its teachers to suspend all face-to-face classes and implement a virtual teaching modality.

On 12 March, the Minister of Health stated Costa Rica will not close its borders to international visitors at that time. The CNE has launched the brand new 1322 COVID-19 help line. Leaders of Belize, Costa Rica, Guatemala, Honduras, Nicaragua, Panama, and the Dominican Republic signed an agreement for dealing with the coronavirus pandemic. It includes canceling the Costa Rican film festival.

On 15 March, the Ministry of Education of Costa Rica decided to temporarily suspend lessons in a total of 317 educational centers, representing 7% of Costa Rica's educational centers. Closures included educational centers with confirmed cases of COVID-19, all public schools for special education, educational centers belonging to the same school circuit as the educational center where a confirmed case was identified, and educational centers that have been affected by prolonged water rationing.

Moreover, an executive agreement between the President of the Republic, Carlos Alvarado Quesada, and the Minister of Health, Daniel Salas, granted health authority to the members of the Costa Rican Public Force (the police enforcement agency) for the surveillance and control of the virus, both to verify the closure of bars, clubs and casinos, as well as to ensure 50% of visiting capacity for the other meeting centers. Businesses that do not comply with the new sanitary policy will be subject of a 30 day long closure.

On 16 March, the government also decreed a state of national emergency, due to the threat of the virus after being present in the country for only 10 days. In addition, lessons were suspended in all public and private schools and colleges until 4 April. Access to the country was also reduced to only Costa Ricans and permanent residents, a measure that will start a minute after midnight on 18 March and last until 12 April. Those entering must remain in quarantine for at least 14 days.

On 20 March, after the school kitchen workers refused to serve students, the Ministry of Public Education (MEP) agreed on delivering food packages to the parents of their students.

On 23 March, the Ministry of Health and the Government announced new prevention measures against the virus, including the total closure of beaches in the country, the mandatory closure of temples and religious services, and vehicle restriction in the main cities of the country from 10 p.m. to 5 a.m.. All residents and refugees will lose their migratory status if they leave the country for any reason.

On 24 March, the government announced they will temporarily reduce their in person workforce by 80% and also void the salary raise approved last January for all public servants except for the police force.

On 26 March, the Finance Minister discussed a bill that the government would be presenting later on. This bill would mean the creation of a solidarity tax that would be deducted from all workers' salaries that earned more than ¢ 500.000. Its goal was helping people impacted by the COVID-19 crisis. Hours later president Carlos Alvarado published that he would not support that bill and stated that "Plan Proteger" consisted of protecting the unemployed and workers already impacted by salary reductions.

On 27 March, the Government announced the extension of the sanitary vehicle restriction on weekends from 8 p.m. until 5 a.m. In addition, the Government announced that it was evaluating the implementation of a temporary solidarity tax on wages above ¢ 1.1 million, a measure that would raise up to ¢ 25,000 million per month, however, the Government announced that other sources of income will be processed and that it will present an extraordinary budget of ¢ 225,000 million.

On 28 March, the Minister of Health Daniel Salas announced they would be imposing a new sanitary restriction for all businesses with sanitary permits that serve the public. This measure would begin at 8 p.m. weekends, starting that very same day.

On 30 March, the Ministry of Health sent a bill to the Asamblea Legislativa, the Costa Rican Congress. This bill pretended to reform the article 378 of the Ley General de Salud (General Health Act) in order to impose fines for violating the sanitary restriction or the quarantine, ranging from 1 through 5 base salaries.

On 31 March, the government announced the opening of the new Centro Especializado de Atención de Pacientes con COVID-19 (CEACO), a center specialized in COVID-19 patients at the facilities of CENARE. It reinforced the services provided by the Caja Costarricense de Seguro Social (CCSS) in Costa Rica by treating up to 88 COVID-19 patients in intermediate or continuing care units.

=== April 2020 ===
On 1 April, with Holy Week and Easter approaching, the government announced new measures to contain the spread of COVID-19 during this time when people are used to going out and vacationing. The main measure was to extend the night driving restriction from Friday, 3 April and until Tuesday, 7 April, from 5:00 p.m. to 5:00 a.m. throughout the country. Long-distance public transport will also be restricted, and establishments with sanitary operating permits and attention to face-to-face public will be closed.

In addition, the Legislative Assembly approved two bills to increase the fines for noncompliance with sanitary orders and vehicle restriction. Fines ranging from ₡450,000 (US$780) to ₡2.2 million (US$3,800) would be applied if a person having risk factors and being a suspected or confirmed case of the disease fails to comply with the isolation order. In the case of the traffic law reform, drivers could be subject to a fine of ₡107,000 (US$185), a loss of six points on their license, and removal of license plates if they violate the restriction.

On 9 April, the Government announced the launch of an economic bonus for those workers affected by the COVID-19 pandemic. The bonus varies between ₡125,000 (US$215) per month for people laid off or with a workday reduced to 50% or more, and ₡62,500 (US$108) per month for those who have reduced their workday by 50% or less.

The first week of April, the Clodomiro Picado Research Institute of the University of Costa Rica, together with the Costa Rican Social Security Fund, announced the initiative that they were preparing a treatment for the new coronavirus from the blood donated by people whom recovered from COVID-19. Three options were announced; the first would refer to using convalescent plasma, which is to take blood from a recovered patient to fractionate from their plasma the part where the antibodies that released the virus are found and transfuse to a patient who is COVID-19 positive.

The second investigation would be to use the blood of a recovered person, but also to purify the antibodies produced, isolate those and apply to a patient. The third option is to create antifidical serum in horses, generating only the antibodies against virus proteins.

The government made the first deposit of the Bono Proteger bond to more than 30,000 beneficiaries from 18 April to 21 April.

On 21 April, the Ministry of Public Education announced the cancellation of the application of the FARO national standardized tests, which would begin to be applied this year to eleventh-year students of academic schools, in the face of the coronavirus crisis.

On 23 April, the Government announced that, due to the high demand for coronavirus test kits, the Costa Rican Social Security Fund together with the National Center for High Technology (CeNAT-Conare) through the CENIBiot Laboratory would begin to produce its own coronavirus tests for the country's population.

=== May 2020 ===
On 1 May, the Ministry of Health announced the reopening of cinemas, theaters, gyms, bicycle rentals and swimming schools, but with measures to prevent the virus, such as the opening of these only between 5 am and 7 pm and with a reduced capacity of people.

On 11 May, the Ministry of Public Education announced that regular attendance lessons would return after the summer holidays, scheduled between 29 June and 10 July, as long as the situation of the pandemic allows it.

The Ministry of Environment and Energy, announced a plan to reopen twelve National Parks in the country, with health measures to prevent the spread of the virus, such as the limited entry of people. It was also announced the reopening of all the country's beaches between 5 and 8 in the morning, during the week, and for sports only, excluding leisure purposes. Also, the Ministry of Health announced that it will allow the return of physical recreational activities that do not involve direct physical contact between people, while the return of activities such as the soccer championship and other high-performance disciplines will be allowed, which must always operate behind closed doors. Lastly, the Costa Rican Tourism Institute announced the reopening of hotels, but only with 50% of its total capacity and with a maximum of 20 rooms reserved at the same time.

The Ministry of Public Works and Transport announced new measures regarding the sanitary vehicle restriction, where the restriction will be exercised from Monday to Friday from 10 at night to 5 in the morning of the following day, and the ends of week from 7 pm to 5 am the following day. In addition, the national restriction by number of plates is maintained.

On 14 May, 52 deputies of the Legislative Assembly of Costa Rica signed a letter addressed to the Pan American Health Organization (PAHO), requesting "urgent and forceful" actions in the face of the COVID-19 situation in Nicaragua, since, according to the legislators, "the Nicaraguan government has recklessly handled the health crisis due to COVID-19", for which they denounce that it could have negative effects in neighboring countries, including Costa Rica.

=== June 2020 ===
On 1 June the Ministry of Health reported On 9 July Costa Rica got to 649 new cases which is, maybe, the biggest number of cases in one day. Also, the health ministry declared that in GAM (Gran Area Metropolitana) there was community contagion. And in cantons that were in orange zone would have different vehicular restriction

=== July 2020 ===
On 17 July the Garabito local government announced they would not follow the central government orders on shops and commercial closures for an Orange Alert area due to the data showing that the canton was in good conditions for commercial operations as in a Yellow Alert area. The next day the central government conceded that the Garabito canton in good conditions to be in Yellow Alert.

=== August 2020 ===
On 3 August 2020, the Constitutional Chamber ordered the Ministry of Health to release an anonymized data set of confirmed cases as requested by journalists and open data activists, the next day there was an unexpected jump in the recovered cases data.

== Impact ==
By 25 March, the Chamber of Commerce and the Federation of Business Chambers of the Central American Isthmus reported that around 3% of the companies have reduced their workforce, with such figure projected to grow to 55% in a month. Other projections forecast an 18% of suspended operations and 11% of definitive closures.

=== Hospitality businesses ===
On 25 March, the Costa Rica Institute of Tourism declared the tourism sector in a total emergency and calamity state; a zero visitors season is expected for at least three months.

On 26 March, the Chamber of Restaurants and Bars of Costa Rica (CACORE) reported 109,000 laid off workers, and 42% (7,980) of the affiliated businesses were closed.

=== Agricultural sector labor exploitation ===
On June a severe increase in positive cases the northern cantons of the country, neighboring Nicaragua, where the main production of pineapple occurs in the country, exposed the exploitation of migrant workers and a working rights and health crisis ensued.

== Vaccination ==
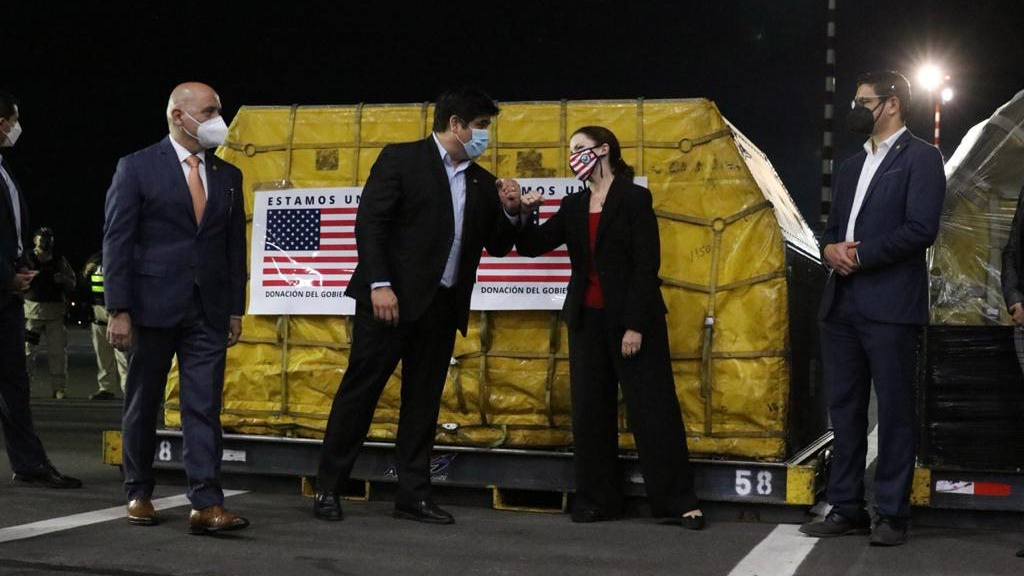
The US delivers Pfizer–BioNTech COVID-19 vaccines to Costa Rica as part of the COVAX initiative in 2021

Costa Rica's vaccine priority is divided into six groups: (1) staff and residents at retirement or nursing homes, first responders and health personnel, (2) Costa Rica's older population, defined here as those ages 58 and up, (3) people from 16 to 58 with risk factors (4) teachers and other staff within the Education Ministry, people employed in hospitality such as resorts and hotels, imprisoned people and judicial staff (5) health science students and related technicians in clinical fields, people ages 40–57 without any of the aforementioned risk factors but whose work puts them in contact with others, (6) all remaining adults. Costa Rica, along with Panama and El Salvador, is leading the race for vaccination against COVID-19 in Central America. By the end of May 2021, Costa Rica has administered 28.37 doses per 100 people or a total of 1,457,802 administered doses. Costa Rica has a vaccine supply of five million doses which covers 49.1% of the population. The nation has purchased four million doses of the BioNTech/Pfizer vaccine and received one million doses of AstraZeneca/Oxford of which 132,000 doses have been allocated through the COVAX mechanism, a worldwide initiative that aims at equitable access for COVID-19 vaccines. Contrarily to many Latin American countries, Costa Rica has not received vaccine donations by China. Although China has exercised vaccine diplomacy with its allies in the region, Costa Rica does not rely on Chinese vaccines in spite of intact diplomatic ties. As of December 8, 2022, mandatory Covid-19 vaccination for children under the age of 12 has been suspended by an Administrative Court which ordered the suspension of executive decree No. 43364 of 13 December 2021, which imposed compulsory COVID-19 vaccination on children of pediatric age. Among others, the plaintiff claimed that the measure is not valid because the vaccine has not yet been approved in its country of origin (the United States) by the Food and Drug Administration (FDA) and it is still in a study phase, a situation that is also accredited by the so-called BLA APPROVAL, issued by the FDA on 23 August. Furthermore, the plaintiff submitted that studies to demonstrate the possible adverse effects of inoculation in a population as vulnerable as children are currently pending, thus suggesting the need for the interim suspension of the measures. By decision no. 439-2022-I, the Administrative Court of San José upheld the claim. In particular, the Court first considered that children have a reinforced protection, not only by the national legal system (best interests of the child, article 5 of the Childhood and Adolescence Code), but also internationally (Convention on the Rights of the Child, Law 7184), due to their vulnerability. Hence, it is of utmost importance to assess whether the mandatory nature of the vaccine could imply a potential harm to them. In this regard, it must be considered that children vaccine has only received an emergency authorization in its country of origin and the administrative process that will lead to its full authorization is still pending. The evidence submitted by the plaintiff, namely the so-called "COVID-19 and compulsory vaccination. Ethical Considerations and Warnings. Policy Summary", issued by the World Health Organization (WHO) on 13 April 2021, also suggests that the WHO itself does not ethically recommend that the vaccine should be compulsory for children due to the lack of data on the safety and efficacy of vaccines in this population. Furthermore, imposing mandatory vaccination on children appears to be disproportionate at present since most countries have lifted various restrictions, including compulsory vaccination on other vulnerable categories, as well as external restrictions, such as vaccination requirements for foreigners entering the country. Based on the above, the Court concluded that, given the legal interest protected, since the possibility of serious effects on children's health has not been scientifically ruled out yet, it is appropriate to suspend the measure imposing mandatory vaccination on children.https://www.covid19litigation.org/news/2022/12/costa-rica-administrative-court-san-jose-provisionally-suspends-application-measures

== Statistics ==
=== Cumulative cases ===
==== Nationwide ====
View source data.
View source data.

=== Daily cases ===
View source data.
View source data.
View source data.
View source data.

=== Medical care ===
View source data.

=== By region ===
Province	Canton	Date first confirmed	Confirmed	Active	Deaths	Recovered
San José	San José	March 15, 2020	42062	6848	619	34595
San José	Escazú	March 15, 2020	6335	1095	67	5173
San José	Desamparados	March 15, 2020	22433	2753	289	19391
San José	Puriscal	March 27, 2020	2267	486	32	1749
San José	Tarrazú	March 27, 2020	547	39	4	504
San José	Aserrí	March 22, 2020	4925	788	43	4094
San José	Mora	March 27, 2020	2988	277	33	2678
San José	Goicoechea	March 18, 2020	12103	1796	201	10106
San José	Santa Ana	March 15, 2020	6292	853	59	5380
San José	Alajuelita	March 28, 2020	11163	2137	125	8901
San José	Vázquez de Coronado	March 20, 2020	6525	944	74	5507
San José	Acosta	June 17, 2020	1856	453	12	1391
San José	Tibás	March 15, 2020	7162	1218	126	5818
San José	Moravia	March 18, 2020	4811	888	65	3858
San José	Montes de Oca	March 20, 2020	4138	340	52	3746
San José	Turrubares	March 28, 2020	269	64	1	204
San José	Dota	August 12, 2020	249	11	4	234
San José	Curridabat	March 17, 2020	7268	535	102	6631
San José	Pérez Zeledón	March 15, 2020	9883	661	163	9059
San José	León Cortés Castro	July 10, 2020	522	30	1	491
Alajuela	Alajuela	March 15, 2020	32420	11604	407	20409
Alajuela	San Ramón	March 27, 2020	5836	1222	70	4544
Alajuela	Grecia	March 15, 2020	6683	2189	84	4410
Alajuela	San Mateo	June 2, 2020	471	31	4	436
Alajuela	Atenas	March 16, 2020	2518	1023	24	1471
Alajuela	Naranjo	March 28, 2020	4519	520	38	3961
Alajuela	Palmares	March 23, 2020	4150	253	48	3849
Alajuela	Poás	March 15, 2020	3398	693	36	2669
Alajuela	Orotina	March 25, 2020	2094	119	20	1955
Alajuela	San Carlos	March 20, 2020	17380	3750	206	13424
Alajuela	Zarcero	May 28, 2020	1442	431	23	988
Alajuela	Sarchí	March 26, 2020	1949	276	11	1662
Alajuela	Upala	May 10, 2020	3382	1337	35	2010
Alajuela	Los Chiles	May 22, 2020	2496	675	44	1777
Alajuela	Guatuso	June 3, 2020	1566	396	21	1149
Alajuela	Río Cuarto	June 16, 2020	909	323	6	580
Cartago	Cartago	March 17, 2020	14192	2711	108	11373
Cartago	Paraíso	April 4, 2020	3659	608	33	3018
Cartago	La Unión	March 15, 2020	9804	792	94	8918
Cartago	Jiménez	March 24, 2020	779	307	11	461
Cartago	Turrialba	April 7, 2020	3183	911	39	2233
Cartago	Alvarado	March 25, 2020	823	158	8	657
Cartago	Oreamuno	March 26, 2020	4481	733	29	3719
Cartago	El Guarco	March 26, 2020	4310	465	20	3825
Heredia	Heredia	March 15, 2020	14707	4171	189	10347
Heredia	Barva	March 15, 2020	4227	718	48	3461
Heredia	Santo Domingo	March 18, 2020	5038	1163	71	3804
Heredia	Santa Bárbara	March 18, 2020	3673	960	43	2670
Heredia	San Rafael	March 21, 2020	4676	692	58	3926
Heredia	San Isidro	March 30, 2020	2468	226	33	2209
Heredia	Belén	March 15, 2020	2678	605	32	2041
Heredia	Flores	March 18, 2020	2696	646	33	2017
Heredia	San Pablo	March 15, 2020	2913	243	41	2629
Heredia	Sarapiquí	May 22, 2020	3696	454	43	3199
Guanacaste	Liberia	March 24, 2020	6158	2743	83	3332
Guanacaste	Nicoya	March 15, 2020	4554	967	61	3526
Guanacaste	Santa Cruz	March 15, 2020	5575	1554	62	3959
Guanacaste	Bagaces	April 30, 2020	1300	311	12	977
Guanacaste	Carrillo	March 27, 2020	3347	1290	46	2011
Guanacaste	Cañas	May 8, 2020	1914	136	31	1747
Guanacaste	Abangares	April 28, 2020	1411	468	10	933
Guanacaste	Tilarán	March 26, 2020	1022	141	10	871
Guanacaste	Nandayure	June 14, 2020	629	38	8	583
Guanacaste	La Cruz	May 4, 2020	1893	279	17	1597
Guanacaste	Hojancha	April 3, 2020	556	50	6	500
Puntarenas	Puntarenas	March 25, 2020	13432	3847	143	9442
Puntarenas	Esparza	April 1, 2020	3559	865	35	2659
Puntarenas	Buenos Aires	June 25, 2020	2399	443	68	1888
Puntarenas	Montes de Oro	March 24, 2020	1277	278	19	980
Puntarenas	Osa	March 29, 2020	2285	177	42	2066
Puntarenas	Quepos	May 10, 2020	3647	676	34	2937
Puntarenas	Golfito	May 1, 2020	3385	237	37	3111
Puntarenas	Coto Brus	March 22, 2020	2186	243	14	1929
Puntarenas	Parrita	June 23, 2020	1740	143	23	1574
Puntarenas	Corredores	May 9, 2020	5013	265	69	4679
Puntarenas	Garabito	March 25, 2020	3268	429	25	2814
Limón	Limón	March 19, 2020	9882	298	110	9474
Limón	Pococí	April 11, 2020	11115	914	104	10097
Limón	Siquirres	April 9, 2020	5466	337	50	5079
Limón	Talamanca	May 7, 2020	2639	77	48	2514
Limón	Matina	June 14, 2020	3126	118	27	2981
Limón	Guácimo	May 14, 2020	4180	245	33	3902
Other		March 18, 2020	675	135	3	537
Total			440647	81325	5312	354010

== See also ==
- COVID-19 pandemic in North America
- COVID-19 pandemic by country and territory
- 2020 in Central America
- History of smallpox in Mexico
- HIV/AIDS in Latin America
- 2013–2014 chikungunya outbreak
- 2009 swine flu pandemic
- 2019–2020 dengue fever epidemic
