= Stephan Brunner =

Costa Rican economist and politician (born 1961)

- Official portrait, 2026

First Vice President of Costa Rica
- In office 8 May 2022 – 30 July 2025 Serving with Mary Munive
- President: Rodrigo Chaves Robles
- Preceded by: Epsy Campbell Barr
- Succeeded by: Mary Munive

Deputy of the Legislative Assembly of Costa Rica
- Incumbent
- Assumed office 1 May 2026
- Preceded by: Danny Vargas Serrano
- Constituency: San José (3rd Office)

Personal details
- Born: Stephan Lars Andreas Brunner Neibig; 28 February 1961 (age 65) San José, Costa Rica
- Party: PPSD (2022–2025); PPSO (2025–present)
- Education: University of Kiel (BA, PhD); Indiana University; Bloomington (MA)

Stephan Lars Andreas Brunner Neibig (born 28 February 1961) is a Costa Rican economist and politician who served as the first vice president of Costa Rica from 2022 to 2025. He assumed office on 8 May 2022.

Brunner earned a Bachelor of Arts degree in cultural economics from the University of Kiel, a Master of Arts in economics from Indiana University Bloomington, and a PhD in economics from the University of Kiel.

On 30 July, Brunner resigned alongside six other cabinet members in order to run in the 2026 Costa Rican general election.
