= Mary Munive =

Costa Rican politician

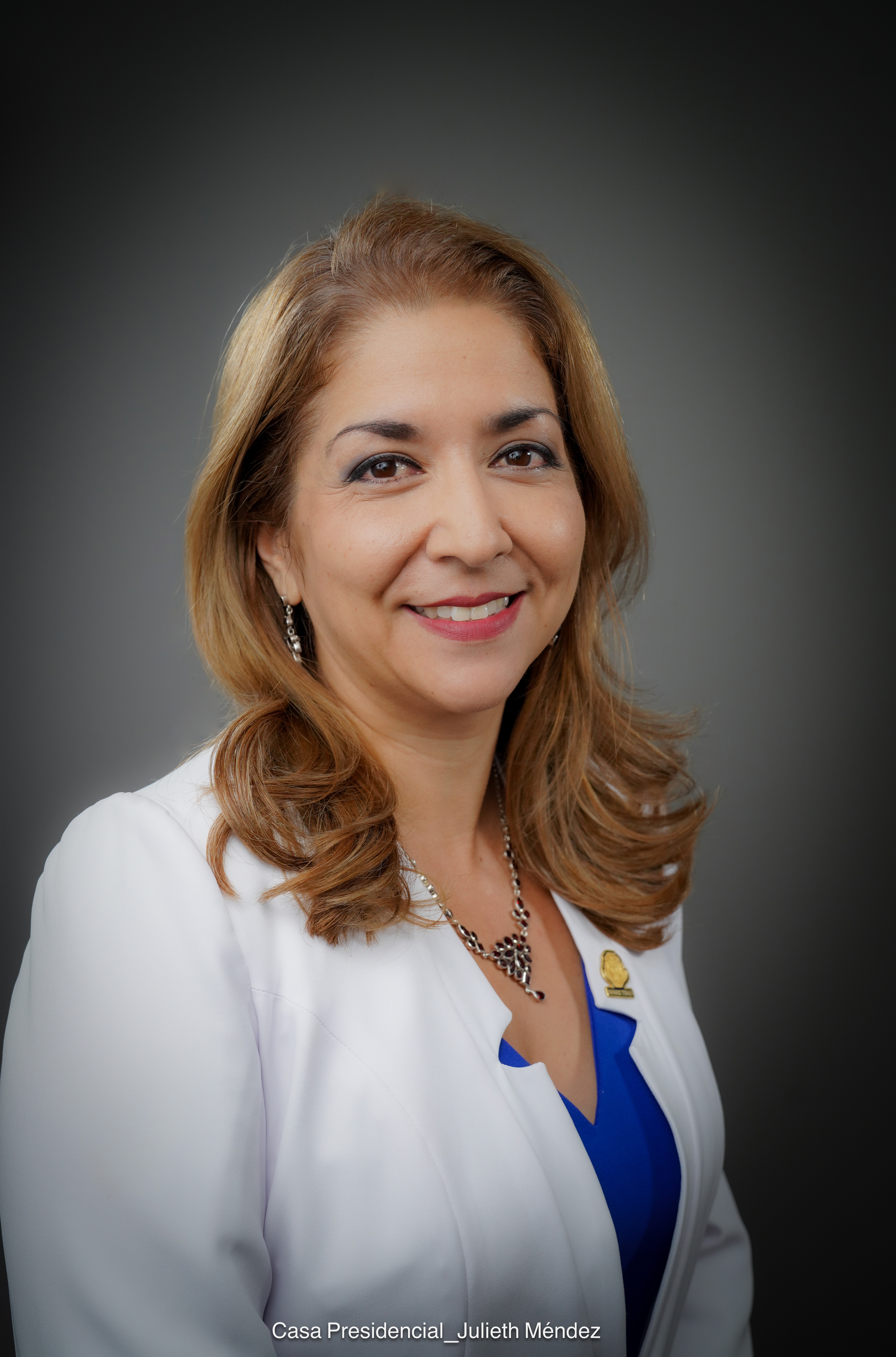

First Vice President of Costa Rica
- In office 31 July 2025 – 8 May 2026
- President: Rodrigo Chaves Robles
- Preceded by: Stephan Brunner
- Succeeded by: Francisco Gamboa (First Vice President); Douglas Soto (Second Vice President)

Second Vice President of Costa Rica
- In office 8 May 2022 – 31 July 2025 Serving with Stephan Brunner
- Preceded by: Marvin Rodríguez Cordero
- Succeeded by: Francisco Gamboa (First Vice President); Douglas Soto (Second Vice President)

Personal details
- Born: Mary Denisse Munive Angermüller; 10 April 1981 (age 45) San José, Costa Rica
- Party: PPSD
- Children: 2
- Education: University of Costa Rica

Mary Denisse Munive Angermüller (born 10 April 1981) is a Costa Rican physician and politician who served as the Second Vice President of Costa Rica under First Vice President Stephan Brunner and President Rodrigo Chaves Robles from 2022 to 2026. She also served as the Minister of Health from 2023 to 2026, and was also the Minister of Sports.

== Early life and education ==
Mary Denisse Munive Angermüller was born in San José, Costa Rica, on 10 April 1981. Her parents were immigrants from Peru and she has German ancestry. She was raised in Tibás. She graduated from the University of Costa Rica (UCR).

== Career ==
Munive became a postgraduate professor of family and community medicine at UCR in 2018. She is the president of the Association of Family and Community Medicine Specialists of Costa Rica.

Rodrigo Chaves Robles selected Stephan Brunner and Munive as his vice presidential running mates for the 2022 election. Their campaign won the election. She is a member of the Social Democratic Progress Party. Munive was placed in charge of Chaves' economic team while Stephan Brunner was placed in charge of the economic team.

Munive was Minister of Sports. Joselyn Chacón Madrigal left her position as Minister of Health and three months later she was succeeded by Munive on 10 May 2023.

The National Medical Union filed a complaint against Munive to the Office of the Public Ethics Ombudsman stating that she broke public integrity as the second part of the salary for 800 doctors in the Ministry of Health was not paid in 2023.

Munive opposes restricting abortion rights. Fabricio Alvarado Muñoz called for Munive to be dismissed as Health Minister in 2025, as she had not implemented restrictions placed on abortions in 2019.

The Responsible Paternity Law allows mothers to declare who the father is and mandates DNA testing paternity disputes. Funding for paternity tests is managed by the Health Ministry. The budget for the paternity tests fell from 1 billion colones to 194 million colones between 2023 and 2025.

== Political stances ==
=== Abortion ===
Munive opposes further restrictions on abortion and supported the 2019 therapeutic abortion regulation. Her position drew criticism from pro-life groups, who questioned her commitment to their cause and called for her removal. However, she did not prevent the implementation of the October 2025 decree, which was issued while she was on vacation. She faced criticism over the government’s delay in modifying those guidelines, with critics accusing her of obstructing a campaign promise.

The October 2025 decree significantly restricted access to abortion in Costa Rica, permitting the procedure only when the mother’s life is in “real and imminent danger,” and removing exceptions related to health risks or fetal inviability.

=== Crime ===
Costa Rica is facing a growing security and homicide crisis, largely attributed to organized crime and drug trafficking. In response, the Chaves administration has shifted toward a more punitive, incarceration-focused approach. Munive has publicly supported this shift, advocating for increased security cooperation with El Salvador and endorsing the construction of a large-scale prison modeled on those promoted by President Nayib Bukele.

=== Public health care ===
The Costa Rican Social Security Fund (CCSS) has faced corruption scandals, severe financial difficulties, and prolonged waiting times for surgical procedures and specialist care. Munive has attributed the crisis to legislative obstruction, a shortage of medical specialists, and institutional inefficiency. In her roles as vice president and minister of health, she has promoted a specific reform package and criticized those she claims are hindering efforts to address the issues.

Munive has promoted Bill 24.015, titled Fortalecimiento de la Salud Pública, as her main proposal to address the shortage of medical specialists and long waiting lists. The bill would allow the hiring of specialists under a legal provision known as “inopia,” intended to fill vacancies affecting services within the Costa Rican Social Security Fund.

=== Waste management ===
In September 2025, Munive signed a decree mandating regionalized waste management, which drew strong opposition from municipalities. The Ombudsman intervened following concerns about increased costs, inadequate planning, and possible environmental and health risks.

== Personal life ==
Munive is married and is the mother of two children.

== Works cited ==
=== News ===
- "Cuestionan recortes de ministra Munive a pruebas de paternidad en Costa Rica". Costa Rica Cronica. 2 October 2025.
- "Denuncian a Munive por faltas al deber de probidad". Diario Extra. 16 February 2024. Archived from the original on 16 February 2025.
- "La Nación reports on World Cup playoff outlook and Costa Rican abortion policy reversal". Costa Rica Cronica. 16 October 2025. Archived from the original on 12 January 2026.
- ""La transparencia es la cura de la corrupción"". Diario Extra. 30 March 2022. Archived from the original on 1 July 2025.
- "¡Tres meses después! Chaves anuncia a Mary Munive como la nueva ministra de Salud". AM Prensa. 10 May 2023. Archived from the original on 1 July 2025.
- "Presidente Chaves modificará por decreto la norma sobre aborto impune y terapéutico". Costa Rica Cronica. 3 October 2025. Archived from the original on 12 January 2026.
- Madrigal, Rebecca (4 April 2022). "Chaves anuncia a Stephan Brunner como coordinador económico y a Mary Munive en lo social". La Nación. Archived from the original on 26 September 2022.

=== Web ===
- "Costa Rica". OECD. Archived from the original on 21 April 2025.
- "Paraguay congratula a las autoridades electas de Costa Rica". Ministry of Foreign Relations. Archived from the original on 10 March 2023.
- "Second Vice President of the Republic". President of Costa Rica. Archived from the original on 1 July 2025.
