= List of mass media in Costa Rica =

This is a list of mass media in Costa Rica.

Costa Rica is ranked fifth in the World Press Freedom Index (2021 edition). This ranking is prepared by the freedom of information organization Reporters Without Borders (RSF), and was published on April 20, 2021. In addition, at the continental level, Costa Rica is in first place among the American countries. In previous years, the country has been ranked number 10 in the 2019 edition; while in 2020 it reached seventh place. Therefore, there has been a slight improvement in the country's situation regarding freedom of the media in recent years, showing a growth rate.

== Television news ==
- Noticias Repretel, Canal 6
- Telenoticias, Canal 7
- NC 11, Canal 11
- Telediario, Canal 8
- Extra Noticias 42, Canal 42
- Anexión TV, Canal 36
- Costa Rica Traveler Magazine
- Noticias Telenorte, Canal 14
- El Heraldo TV, canal 44

== Newspapers ==
- La Gaceta Government Official Newspaper
- La Nación
- La República
- The Costa Rica News (English).
- Diario Extra
- Al Día
- La Prensa Libre
- El Financiero Weekly
- Semanario Universidad Weekly
- The Tico Time (English).
- Tiempos del Mundo Weekly. Hemispheric Edition

== Magazines ==
- Revista Perfil
- EKA
- Actualidad Económica
- Apetito
- Costa Rica Guest Magazine
- Costa Rica Real Estate Guide
- Summa
- Where In Costa Rica
- Casa Galeria

== Radio ==
- Radio U
- Beatz106

== Internet ==
- CRHoy
- PZ Actual
- Ameliarueda
- Costa Rica Business News
- Costa Rica Star
- InformaTico
- El Pregon
- Futbol Costa Rica
- Q Costa Rica
- NAICR https://naicr.digital/
- The Ticonews post (English).
