= Juan Santamaría =

Costa Rican national hero; drummer in the Second Battle of Rivas (1856)

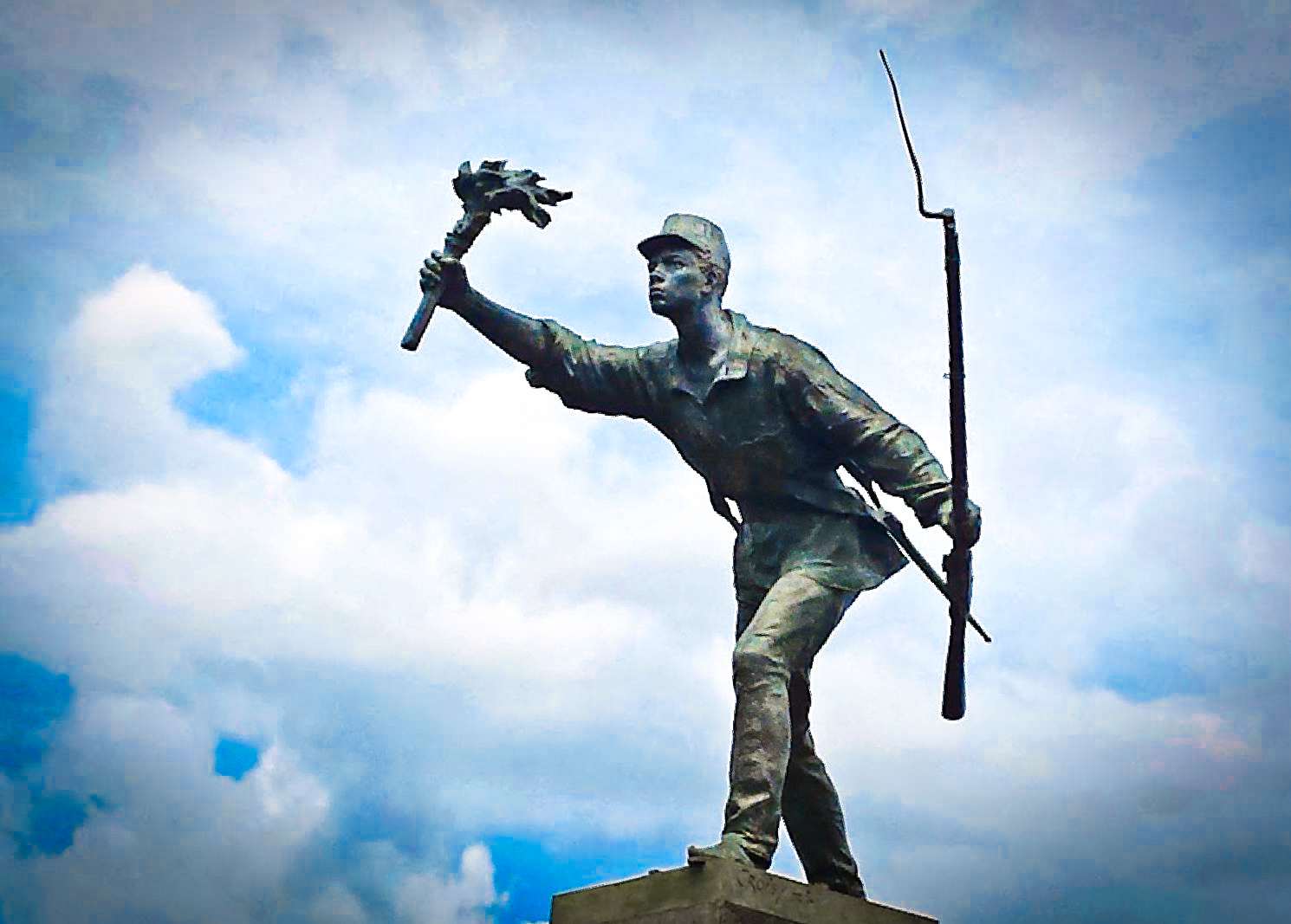
- Statue of Juan Santamaría in Alajuela.
- Born: Juan Santamaría Rodríguez; August 29, 1831; Alajuela, Federal Republic of Central America
- Died: April 11, 1856 (aged 24); Rivas, Nicaragua
- Cause of death: Gunshot wounds
- Occupation: Drummer
- Known for: National hero of Costa Rica
- Military career
- Allegiance: Costa Rica
- Conflicts: Filibuster War; Second Battle of Rivas †

Juan Santamaría Rodríguez (August 29, 1831 – April 11, 1856) was a drummer in the Costa Rican army, officially recognized as the national hero of his country for his actions in the 1856 Second Battle of Rivas, in the Filibuster War. He died in the battle carrying a torch he used to light the enemy stronghold on fire, securing a victory for Costa Rica against American mercenary William Walker and his forces. Thirty five years after his death, he began to be idolized and was used as a propaganda tool to inspire Costa Rican nationalism. A national holiday in Costa Rica, Juan Santamaría Day, is held annually on April 11 to commemorate his death.

On September 15, 1891, a huge bronze statue of the hero was erected in Juan Santamaría de Alajuela Park in his home town, Alajuela. Later, the main airport of Costa Rica, and the historical museum of Alajuela were named after him, and many literary, musical, and art works have been created in his honor. Along with commemorating his heroic acts, many historical studies have been done to investigate the true identity and actions of Juan Santamaría.

== Life ==
Santamaría was born in the city of Alajuela on August 29, 1831. His mother was María Manuela Santamaría, and his father was unknown. He went to elementary school in Alajuela before working from a young age. Santamaría had many jobs in Alajuela such as a sweets vendor, laborer, coffee picker, and, finally, a drummer in the military band of Alajuela, which lead him to become a drummer for the Costa Rican Army. He was a drummer in the Costa Rican army until his death in the Second Battle of Rivas while completing the heroic deed for which he is remembered.

== Participation in the Filibuster War ==
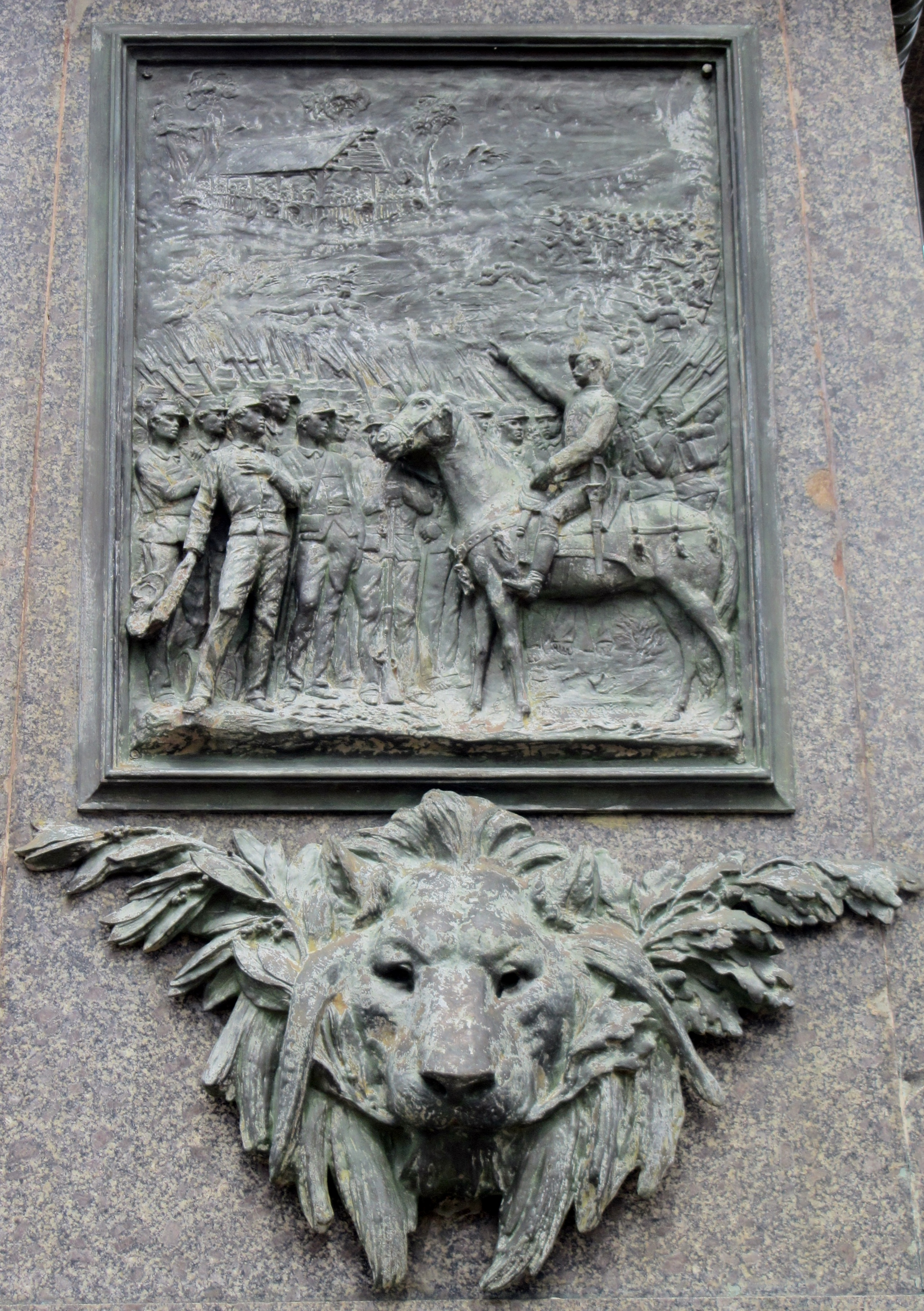
A depiction of the Second Battle of Rivas under the statue of Santamaría in Alajuela

The war began when William Walker, a United States filibuster, or person engaged in unauthorized warfare against a foreign country, overthrew the government of Nicaragua in 1856 and attempted to conquer the other nations in Central America, including Costa Rica, in order to form a private slaveholding empire. Costa Rican President Juan Rafael Mora Porras called upon the general population to take up arms and march north to Nicaragua to fight against the foreign invader. This started the Filibuster War. Santamaría, a poor laborer and the illegitimate son of a single mother, joined the army as a drummer. The troops nicknamed him "el erizo" ("the hedgehog") on account of his spiked hair.

After routing a small contingent of Walker's soldiers at an hacienda called Santa Rosa, Guanacaste, the Costa Rican troops continued marching north and reached the city of Rivas, Nicaragua, on April 8, 1856. The battle that ensued is known as the Second Battle of Rivas. Combat was fierce and the Costa Ricans were not able to drive out Walker's men, entrenched in a building near the town center, from which they commanded an advantageous firing position.

According to the traditional account, on April 11, Salvadoran General José María Cañas suggested that one of the soldiers advance towards the hostel with a torch and set it on fire. Some soldiers tried and failed, but Santamaría finally volunteered on the condition that in the event of his death, someone would look after his mother. He then advanced and was mortally wounded by enemy fire. Before expiring, however, he succeeded in setting fire to the building, thus contributing decisively to the Costa Rican victory at Rivas.

This account is supported by a petition for a state pension filed in November 1857 by Santamaría's mother, as well as by government documents showing that the pension was granted. Various historians, however, have questioned whether the account is accurate and whether Santamaria died under different circumstances. At any rate, towards the end of the nineteenth century, Costa Rican intellectuals and politicians seized on the war against Walker and on the figure of Santamaría for nationalist purposes.

== National symbolism ==
=== Santamaría's initial fame ===
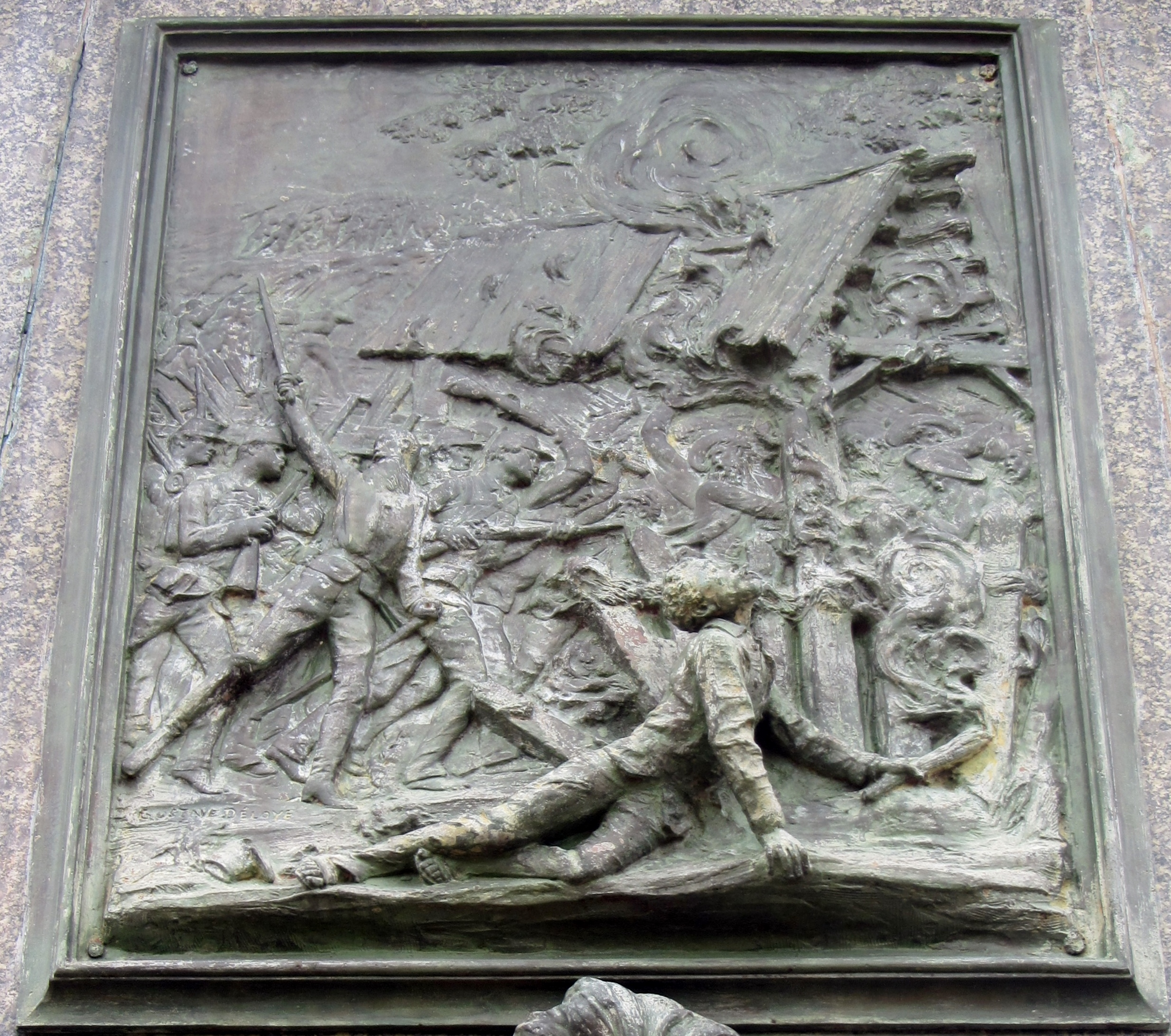
Another feature of the statue in Alajuela depicting Santamaría's death.

Following his death, the Filibuster War raged on, eventually ending in the defeat of William Walker and his forces. Juan Santamaría's actions, however, were not mentioned in Costa Rican national discourse until 1885, 29 years after his death. His name was first mentioned in an article in El Diario de Costa Rica, a national newspaper, titled "Un Héroe Anómino". This article was written in response to the threats to Costa Rican independence from Guatemala's dictator at the time, Justo Rufino Barrios; Barrios declared he would use force to unite the countries of Central America in the Union of Central America if they did not consent on their own to unity. "Un Héroe Anónimo" was written about Santamaría's sacrifice and two other generals from the Filibuster War to inspire and mobilize the population of Costa Rica against the threat to their sovereignty. This call to arms was repeated as the article was published in other official newspapers, and the President of Costa Rica at the time declared a new national steamship would bear the name The Juan Santamaría in the hero's honor. Juan Santamaría was used as a figurehead around which Costa Rican leaders developed a national identity to rally support in defending Costa Rican sovereignty. While Costa Rican troops never even fought against Guatemalan forces due to the defeat of Barrios by troops from El Salvador, the story of Juan Santamaría remained a central feature of Costa Rican national identity, and he was soon declared a national hero. Through written press, festivals in his honor, and the promotion of his story by the education system, Juan Santamaría became a symbol of Costa Rica.

=== Becoming a symbol for Costa Rican independence ===
The coat of arms of the province of Alajuela, where Juan Santamaría was from.

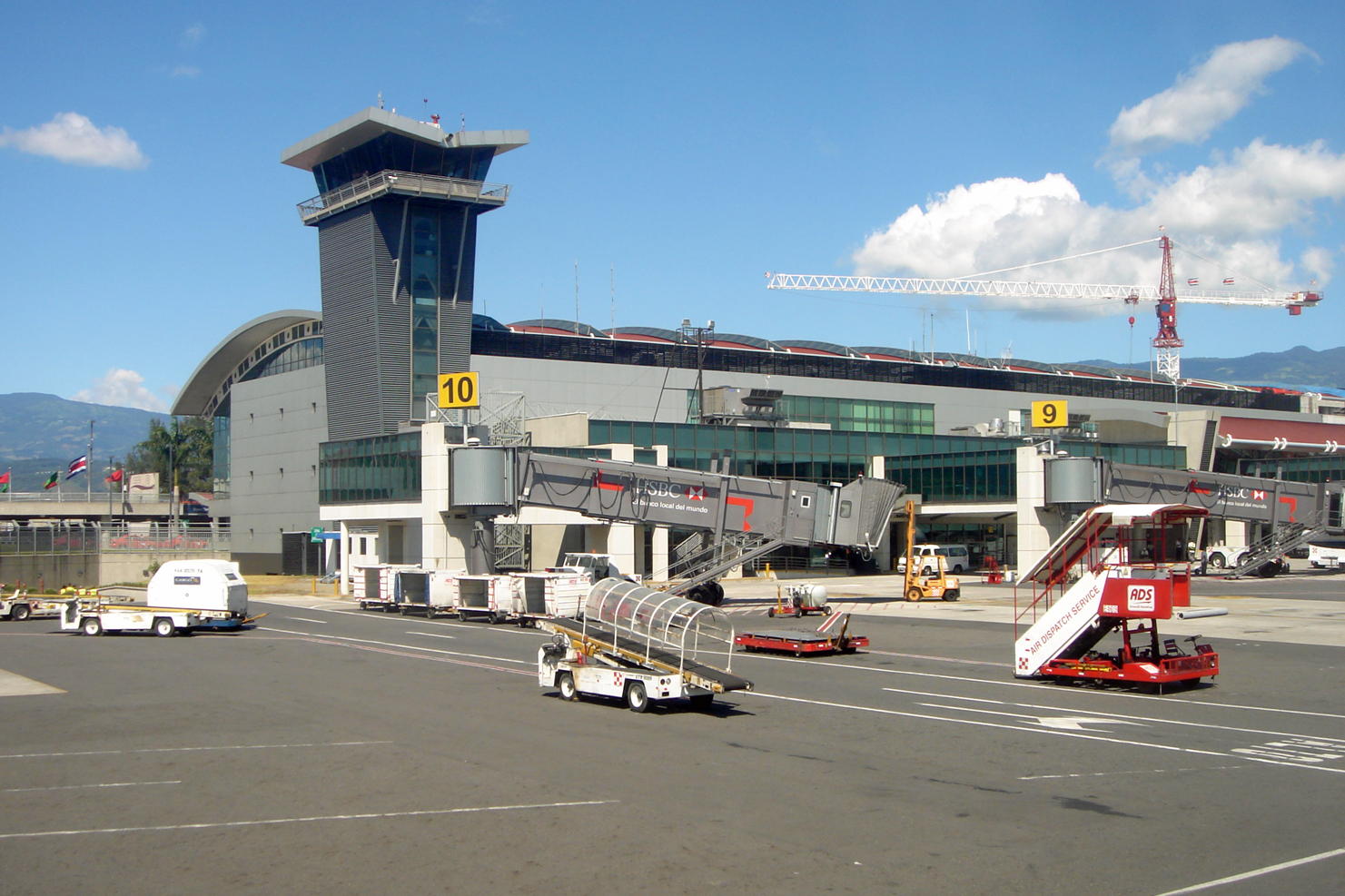
Juan Santamaría International Airport (SJO).

The nationally recognized independence day in Costa Rica is September 15, the anniversary of the day Central America declared independence from Spain in 1821. However Costa Rican independence has become synonymous with Juan Santamaría, the Second Battle of Rivas and the Filibuster War, because this was the only time the country fought to remain a sovereign nation. In 1891, on September 15, a statue of Juan Santamaría was erected in Alajuela to commemorate him, and on many later Independence Day celebrations the government further honored and celebrated Juan Santamaría for his heroism in the struggle against William Walker. Additionally, the anniversary of his death, April 11th, is a national holiday: Juan Santamaría Day.

== Memorials ==
On the 15th of September, 1891, the government unveiled the large bronze statue of Juan Santamaría in the park in Alajuela named after the hero. The statue was commissioned by the Costa Rican government and made by the French sculptor Aristide Croisy. Around the base of the statue are images depicting Santamaría volunteering himself to his leader to attempt to burn down the building, and him dying while setting the building alight. Beneath these images sit lion heads, symbolic of strength and courage. At the unveiling of the statue there was a parade in his honor with the President, prominent leadership from the Catholic Church, governors, foreign dignitaries, and the family of other prominent Costa Rican heroes. There were musical performances and speeches emphasizing his heroism and sacrifice, some even comparing him to Christ.

Other statues of Juan Santamaría can be found outside the Costa Rican Embassy in Spain, and in front of the Costa Rican National Congress in San José.

The coat of arms of Alajuela was changed in 1908 to feature a hand holding a torch, symbolic of Juan Santamaría's heroic act in carrying the torch to burn down the enemy stronghold in the Second Battle of Rivas.

The international airport, located in the city of Alajuela (Santamaría's place of birth), and which serves San José, the capital city of Costa Rica, was also named after him.

== Anthem ==
In 1891, Pedro Calderón Navarro and Emilio Pacheco Cooper composed an anthem, Himno Patriótico A Juan Santamaría, 11 De Abril, to Juan Santamaría. It was sung for the first time during the Juan Santamaria Statue inauguration on the 15 of September of 1891. The lyrics are as follows:

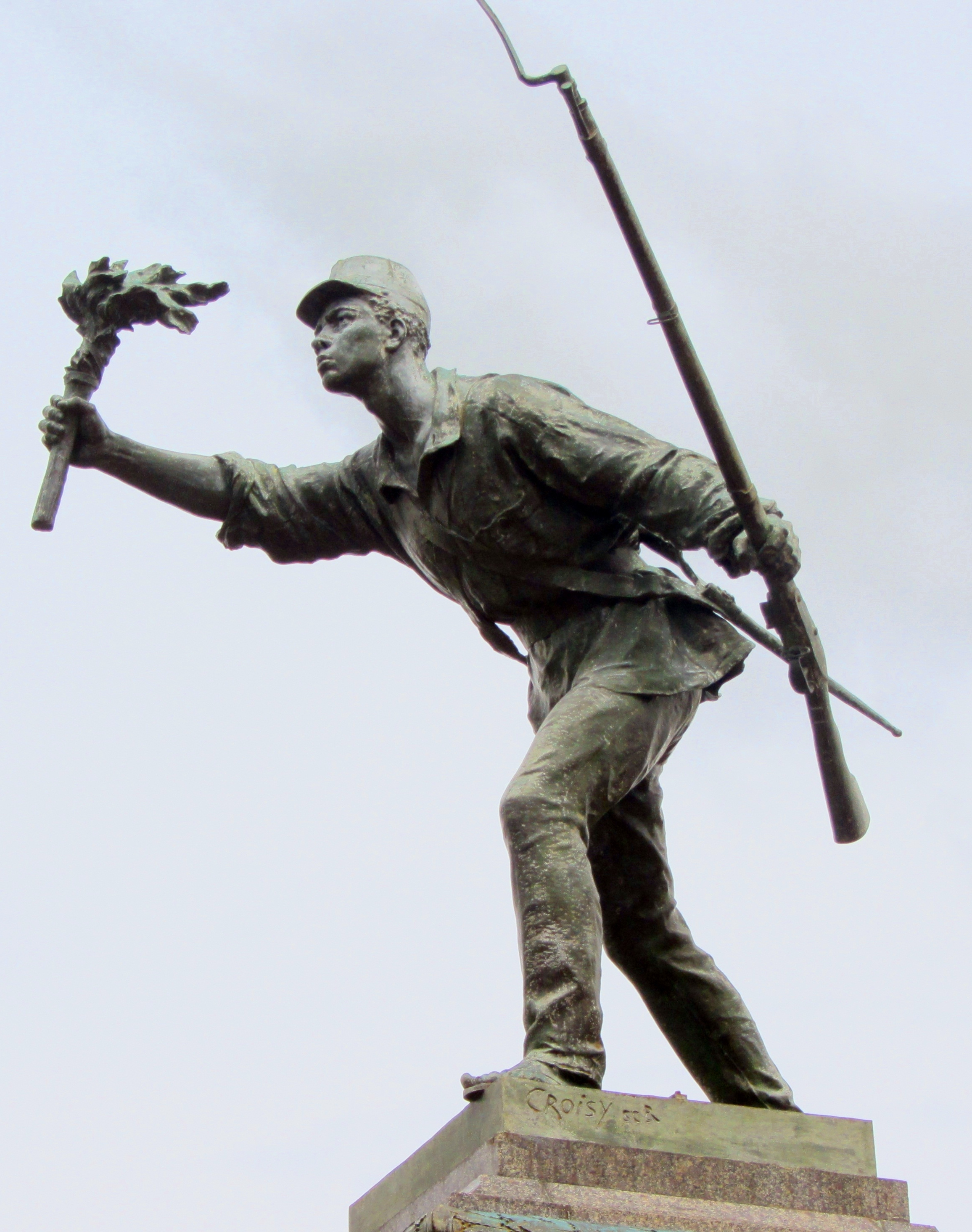
The bronze statue of Juan Santamaría in Alajuela.

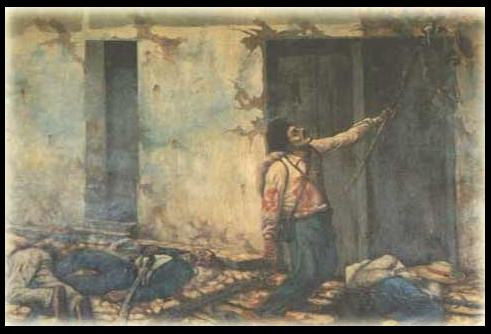
The painting titled "La Quema del Méson por Juan Santmaría" done by Costa Rican painter Enrique Echandi in 1896.

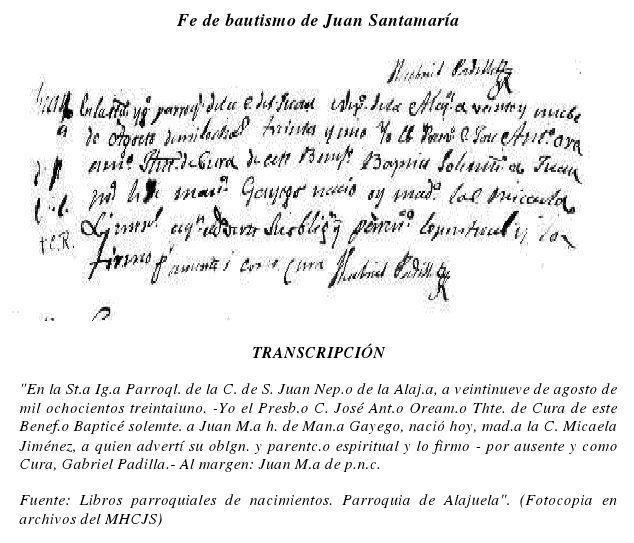
The baptismal certificate of Juan Santamaría. He was baptized in Alajuela, Costa Rica.

== Historical debate ==
No single or conclusive identity for Juan Santamaría has been agreed upon by scholars and historians, thus the debate over his existence continues to this day. They cite his baptismal certificate, documentation of his name on a list of soldiers from Alajuela, and his mother's pension filing.

The first writings about Juan Santamaría were by José de Obaldía and Álvaro Contreras Membreño; in their essays they referred to Santamaría as "glorious" and a "sublime martyr" who gave his life for Costa Rica. Their articles were not written just to tell Santamaría's story, but to unify the population against a threat to their sovereignty. This motivation is important to remember because it influenced how Santamaría was portrayed. Despite being a mulatto, or of mixed race, as his story was popularized, he was significantly white-washed. Even in the famous bronze statue of Santamaría, he looks white and is wearing a French soldier's uniform, further reinforcing the description that he was white. When Santamaría was first glorified, Costa Rican leaders wanted to unify the country as a homogenous and white nation, which caused them to depict Juan Santamaría as white. This misrepresentation caused many historians to question the authenticity of Santamaría as a real person. The municipality of Alajuela, in order to prove Santamaría was real, compiled witnesses and fellow soldiers to attest that he was real, and that he died burning down the enemy stronghold in Rivas. The municipality of Alajuela also provided materials such as his birth certificate, and his mother's request for pension from the government. These documents and statements were all assembled in the book called El Libro del Héroe, or The Book of Hero. Furthermore, Santamaría's baptismal certificate from a church in Alajuela was found, and along with his own name, it also has his mother's name, María Manuela Santamaría. The certificate listed his father's name as unknown, supporting the story that Santamaría was raised by a single mother. Two more documents that historians use to prove his existence can be found in the Costa Rican national archives. These documents are two separate lists of soldiers from Alajuela; the name Juan Santamaría can be seen on both.

A document listing the names and causes of death for soldiers in the Costa Rican army, however, is one of the reasons some doubt the story of Juan Santamaría's actions in the Second Battle of Rivas. This document written in 1858 by the chaplain of the Costa Rican army, Priest Rafael Francisco Calvo, listed a man named Juan Santamaría from Alajuela who died from cholera, a common deadly illness at the time. A doctor who lived with Calvo later in his life named Rafael Calderón Muñoz claims when he asked the priest about the man who died of cholera, Calvo claimed it was a different Juan Santamaría than the hero. Other documents brought forward that support Calvo's claim that it was a different Juan Santamaría include a military census listing five different people named Juan Santamaría from Alajuela, and a different report of people who died between April and May of 1856 that listed the death of a Juan Santamaría who died in Rivas. Despite lacking proof of details, there is a strong and consistent oral tradition that Juan Santamaría existed, he was present at the Second Battle of Rivas, he was one of the people who participated in burning down the building, and he died in the act.
