= Guanacaste Day =

Holiday in Costa Rica

- Observed by: Costa Rica
- Type: Historical
- Significance: Celebration of Costa Rican annexation
- Date: July 25th
- Next time: July 25, 2027
- Frequency: annual

Guanacaste Day is a Costa Rican holiday celebrating Costa Rica's annexation of the Guanacaste province in 1824. It is celebrated on July 25.

== History ==
Also known as Nicoya´s annexation to Costa Rica in 1824.

The land had three major cities: Nicoya, Santa Cruz, and Liberia. After a few negotiations in open meetings, the three cities decided to call a referendum, which took place in Nicoya.

It was a divided decision, with Nicoya and Santa Cruz voting yes and Liberia voting no. So the annexation won.

The Central American Federal Republic passed the law and signed it on July 25, 1824, allowing the Guanacaste province to become part of Costa Rican territory.
