= 2013 in Costa Rica =

- Decades: 1990s; 2000s; 2010s; 2020s
- See also: Other events of 2013; Timeline of Costa Rican history

Events in the year 2013 in Costa Rica.

== Incumbents ==
- President – Laura Chinchilla Miranda (Partido Liberación Nacional – PLN)
- First Vice President – Alfio Piva Mesén (PLN)
- Second Vice President – Luis Liberman Ginsburg (PLN)
- President of the Legislative Assembly – Victor Emilio Granados Calvo (Partido Accessibilidad Sin Exclusión) until 1 May; succeeded by Luis Fernando Mendoza Jiménez (PLN).

== Events ==
=== January ===
- 1 January – New Year's Day, a national holiday celebrated with a big dance in Parque Central in San José.
- 9–21 January – The Palmares Festival was held. The fiestsas included concerts, fairgrounds, eating and drinking, and parades on horseback known as topes. There were also so-called bullfights (corridas) which are really a rodeo with bull riders (montadores) and dozens of members of the public in the ring called improvisados who stand around until the bull chases them, and then they run away. Bulls are not killed but people sometimes are.
- 21 January – The National Biosecurity Technical Commission (CTNBio) granted the American company Delta & Pine Land, a subsidiary of the multinational biotechnology company Monsanto, permission to grow genetically modified corn in Costa Rica. There are 443 hectares of biotech crops in Costa Rica, including cotton, soybeans, pineapple, and banana, which are being grown by the companies Semillas Olson, D & PL Semillas, Bayer, Semillas del Trópico, and Del Monte.
- 31 January – A new law prohibiting hunting for sport was signed by President Laura Chinchilla. The law set fines of up to ₡1.5 million for sport hunting and up to ₡900,000 for wildlife trafficking.

=== February ===
- 1–3 February – Annual Puntarenas Carnival.
- 5 February – The Municipal Council of San José passed a motion banning the growth, sale, and consumption of genetically modified food within the canton.
- 20 February–3 March – The Fiestas Cívicas Liberia took place, an annual festival in Liberia, which included a parade of 3,000 riders, bullfights, and the election of a festival queen.

=== March ===
- 10 March – The National Oxherds Day (Día Nacional del Boyero) was celebrated when hundreds of oxcarts paraded from Escazú to San Antonio. The holiday has fallen on the second Sunday of March since 1984. This year, an extended festival with a daily programme of events began on the second of March because it was the 30th anniversary of the event and included a folklore festival, traditional music, dance, and costumes, parades, and fireworks.
- 19 March – Saint Joseph's Day, celebration of the patron saint of San José.
- 22 March – Controversy followed the loss by the national football team of a World Cup qualifying match against the United States during a heavy snow storm in Denver that covered the playing pitch in snow during the game. The referee, Joel Aguilar of El Salvador, paused the game and consulted both teams, who agreed to play on. Nevertheless, Costa Rica complained of the decision afterwards following their 1–0 defeat to the Usonians.
- 24 March – A magnitude 4.0 earthquake occurred at 7.14 am at a depth of two kilometres, 13 km southeast of Pavón in Golfito.
- 28 March – Holy Thursday, a national holiday.
- 29 March – Good Friday, a national holiday.

=== April ===
- 11 April – Battle of Rivas Day or Juan Santamaría Day, a national holiday that commemorates the national hero who fought at the Second Battle of Rivas against the American invader William Walker in 1856.
- 15 April – Laura Chinchilla, with an approval rating of 26 percent, was found to be the least popular president in the Western Hemisphere, by a Mexican consultancy ranking of the leaders of 19 countries. Chinchilla later dismissed the finding as "aberrant" and like comparing "pears and oranges".
- 19 April – Aboriginal Day.

=== May ===
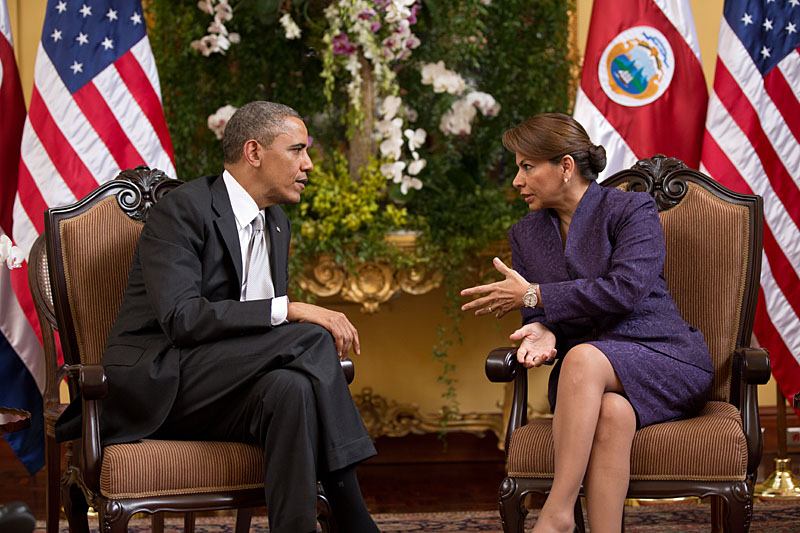
Barack Obama and Laura Chinchilla

- 1 May – Labour Day (May Day), a national holiday.
- 3 May – The President of the United States, Barack Obama, arrived for a 24-hour visit, his first to Costa Rica. He held a bilateral meeting, a joint press conference, and a working dinner with President Chinchilla.
- 4 May – The Central America Forum on Sustainable Economic Development was addressed by Barack Obama at the Old Customs House in San José.
- 11 May – President Chinchilla made a sudden trip to Lima, Peru, to attend the wedding of the son of her second Vice President, Luis Liberman. She did not inform Congress beforehand as mandated by Article 139.5 of the Constitution. She was accompanied by her husband, José María Rico; her assistant, Irene Pacheco; the Minister of Communication, Francisco Chacón; and Chacón's wife, the Minister of Foreign Trade, Anabel González. They flew in a private plane owned by Gabriel Morales Fallon which had also taken her in March to the funeral of Venezuelan president, Hugo Chávez. The plane and its owner were under investigation by Costa Rica and Colombia for drug trafficking. The incident led to the resignations of Francisco Chacón, Irene Pacheco, and the head of the Office of Intelligence and Security, Mauricio Boraschi.
- 23 May – The Costa Rica-based Liberty Reserve digital currency business was shut down by United States authorities on suspicion of criminal activity, including the biggest money laundering operation in history. Liberty was operated in Costa Rica for seven years by expatriates from the U.S. before it was dismantled by the biggest money laundering investigation ever conducted, in which at least 17 countries participated.
- 31 May – An environmentalist, Jairo Mora Sandoval, was murdered by poachers near Limón while attempting to protect the nests of leatherback sea turtles.

=== June ===
- 16 June – Father's Day (third Sunday of June).

=== July ===
- 3 July – Minister for the Environment René Castro signed a decree making July 4 the National Wild Cat Day (Día Nacional del Felino Silvestre). There are six species of wild cat in Costa Rica: the jaguar, puma, ocelot, margay, jaguarundi, and oncilla.
- 4 July – The inaugural Día Nacional del Felino Silvestre was celebrated.
- 24 July – Costa Rica was blocked from ratifying the European Union Central American Association Agreement (EU-CAAA) when Italy protested against the use of geographical indication (GI) trademarks by Tico cheese manufacturers.
- 25 July – Guanacaste Day, a national holiday marking the annexation of Guanacaste from Nicaragua in 1824.

=== August ===
Basilica of Nuestra Señora de los Ángeles

- 1 August – National Science and Technology Day (August is Science and Technology Month).
- 2 August – Feast of Nuestra Señora de los Ángeles, patron saint of Costa Rica.
- 15 August – Mother's Day, a national holiday.
- 24 August – National Parks Day.
- 31 August – Day of the Black Person and Afro-Costa Rican Culture (Día de la Persona Negra y La Cultura Afro Costarricense).

=== September ===
- 5 September – A magnitude 6.0 earthquake occurred at a depth of 41.7 kilometres, at 6.29 am, 44 km west of Sardinal in Guanacaste.
- 9 September – Children's Day.
- 14 September – Annual Parade of Lanterns (Desfile de faroles) to celebrate El Grito de la Independencia.
- 15 September – Independence Day, a national holiday, preceded by Semana Cívica (Civic Week).

=== October ===
- 2 October – The 2014 election season was opened in an official ceremony at the Tribunal Supremo de Elecciones de Costa Rica in San José. Tribunal President Luis Antonio Sobrado González addressed civic comments to citizens, lawmakers, and the media. Several presidential candidates attended the event. The number registered to vote was 3,078,321, an increase of 7.4% compared to the 2010 election. For the first time in 2014, expatriate Ticos will be able to cast absentee ballots, through their nearest consulate, in the presidential and vice-presidential elections, but not for the assembly. The number of Ticos abroad registered to vote was 12,654, with 8,316 in the United States, 484 in Canada, 418 in Mexico, and 368 in Spain. There were nearly 50,000 naturalised Costa Ricans eligible to vote. Voting is obligatory in Costa Rica, nevertheless abstentionism was 35 percent in 2006 and 32 percent in 2010.
- 11–19 October – The second annual Costa Rica International Film Festival presented 140 films from around the world.
- 12 October – Día de las Culturas (formerly Columbus Day).
- 15 October – The Episcopal Conference of Costa Rica released its 2013–14 voter guide, Rehabilitation of Politics, containing principles for Catholics to consider when voting in the forthcoming parliamentary and presidential elections on 2 February 2014. Catholics were urged to vote against candidates who support the legalization of abortion, in-vitro fertilization, and same-sex unions.
- 18 October – Bicentenary of San José. The city was founded before 1813, but the Spanish Crown officially declared it a city in that year.
- 26 October
  - The President of Ireland, Michael D. Higgins, arrived in Costa Rica. He was the first Irish president to visit the country.
  - A magnitude 4.5 earthquake occurred at 4.34 pm at a depth of 7.6 kilometres, 15 km south of Pavón in Golfito.
- 27 October – A strong magnitude 5.3 earthquake shook most of the country at 9.28 am. The epicentre was 40 kilometres southeast of La Cuesta de Corredores near the Panamanian border.
- 28 October – The Irish president began the official work of his state visit by meeting President Laura Chinchilla at the Casa Presidencial.
- 30 October – President Michael D. Higgins rode an aerial tram through the rain forest canopy in Braulio Carrillo National Park with the Minister for the Environment, René Castro, before departing for Ireland.

=== November ===
National Flag Day on 12 November

- 2 November – All Soul's Day.
- 3–7 November – President Laura Chinchilla travelled to Paris accompanied by the Minister of Communications, Carlos Roverssi; the Minister of Foreign Trade, Anabel González; the Foreign Minister, Enrique Castillo; and a group of officials.
- 4 November – The Costa Rican Insurance Superintendency announced a 12.4 percent increase in the price of mandatory vehicle circulation permits (marchamos) in 2014.
- 8 November – President Chinchilla met Pope Francis in the Apostolic Palace Library in the Vatican, accompanied by a presidential delegation of thirteen people including the Minister of Communications, Carlos Roverssi; the Foreign Minister, Enrique Castillo; foreign policy chief, Javier Díaz; Deputy Ileana Brenes Jiménez of the National Liberation Party; the Costa Rican ambassador to the Vatican, Fernando Sánchez; the President's personal assistant, Alejandra Fonseca; Secretary of the Governing Council, Marta Monge; the chief of protocol, Ludwig Sibaja; and the President's husband. During their 25-minute meeting, Chinchilla gave the Pope a handmade stole made by indigenous women from Costa Rica. He gave her a copy of the Aparecida Document (the master plan for the New Evangelization in Latin America), and a medal of his pontificate. The President told the Pope that she would not be attending the canonization of Pope John Paul II. Chinchilla, who visited Pope Benedict XVI on 28 May 2012, invited Pope Francis to visit her country (John Paul II visited Costa Rica in 1983).
- 11 November – A day of protests took place throughout the country when anti-government marches were conducted by public employees, teachers, union members, health workers, motorcyclists, and employees of the Instituto Costarricense de Electricidad. People were concerned about such diverse matters as tax reform, the increased price of vehicle circulation permits (marchamos), the high cost of basic goods, and the perceived privatization of health services. President Chinchilla called the protests "irresponsible" and "unjustified".
- 11 November – In the first ten months of 2013, 12.3 million smuggled cigarettes were seized in Costa Rica, five times more than in 2012. The Fiscal Control Police (PCF) attributed the increased confiscations to police efficiency and were unable to say if there had been a rise in smuggling. The cigarettes came from Canada, China, and Panama.
- 12 November – National Flag Day (Día del Pabellón Nacional).
- 15 November – Costa Rican scientist-engineer Sandra Cauffman (née Sandra María del Socorro Molina Rojas) participated in the American space agency NASA's first press conference in the Spanish language. The event was broadcast live on NASA TV and discussed the agency's mission to Mars called MAVEN (Mars Atmosphere and Volatile EvolutioN), of which Cauffman is the Deputy Project Manager.
- 15 November – Miguel Solis and Alexander Rivas, former bodyguards of the Brazilian model Gisele Bündchen and her husband, the American football player Tom Brady, were sentenced by a court in Puntarenas to five years in prison for attempted murder by shooting at photographers during the celebrity couple's wedding in Cóbano de Puntarenas on 4 April 2009.
- 17 November – A large crowd took part in a Catholic anti-abortion march, the Caminata por la Vida y la Familia, between Central Park and Sabana Park in San José. The march was organized by the Episcopal Conference of Costa Rica. The Archbishop of Alajuela, Angel Sancasimiro, demanded that presidential candidates in the 2014 election reject same-sex marriage initiatives and added, "We feel an obligation to show our current and future legislators, our current and future government, what we think, long for and want in crucial issues such as family, life and the whole culture."
- 19 November – The World Bank published Paying Taxes 2014, a report which identified Costa Rica as having the second-highest tax rates in Central America and the Caribbean, behind Nicaragua.
- 22 November – The International Court of Justice in The Hague ruled in favour of Costa Rican complaints by giving Nicaragua two weeks to remove all equipment and personnel, military and civilian, from Isla Calero on the San Juan River, and to repair Nicaraguan damage performed to the wetland by dredging canals. The dispute began in October 2010 when Costa Rica accused Nicaragua of invading its territory while the latter retorted that it was their country.
- 22 November – Teacher's Day.

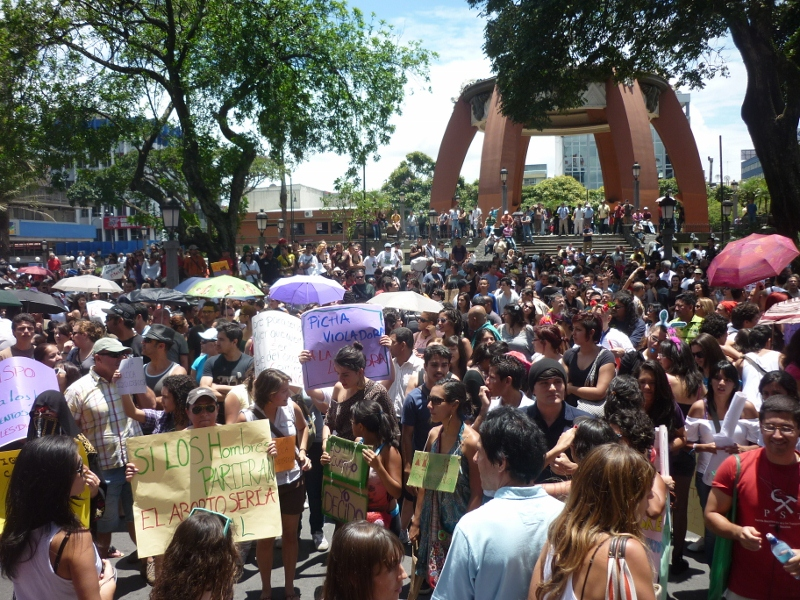
The first Marcha de las Putas in front of the Metropolitan Cathedral in San José in 2011, with Parque Central in the background

- 22 November – The second Costa Rican Marcha de las Putas (SlutWalk) was held in San José in reaction to a statement by presidential candidate Óscar López that "There is a fine line between rape and consent". The first Marcha de las Putas on 14 August 2011 was in reaction to remarks by Francisco Ulloa, a Costa Rican bishop, during a mass on the feast of Nuestra Señora de los Ángeles, urging women to dress "with modesty" and "with shame".
- 23 November – The sixteenth annual Fiesta de Música Boyera y Campesina was held. The first one took place on 21 November 1998.
- 24 November – The seventeenth Oxcart Parade (Entrada de Santos y Desfile de Boyeros por San José) took place in San José, an annual event on the last Sunday in November. The inaugural parade occurred in 1997.
- 26 November – Costa Rica became the second Latin American country after Mexico to sign a memorandum of understanding with the United States on the U.S. Foreign Account Tax Compliance Act. Finance Minister Édgar Ayales and the U.S. Chargé d'Affairs, Gonzalo Gallegos, signed the document at the Foreign Ministry to ratify the agreement that Costa Rican financial institutions will report to the United States the holdings of American citizens living in Costa Rica while U.S. banks will report similar information to Costa Rica about Tico expatriates in the U.S.
- 26–7 November – The seventh annual China-Latin America and Caribbean Business Summit took place in Escazú. Eight hundred business personnel took part from 20 countries including Argentina, Brazil, China, Colombia, Costa Rica, Mexico, and Peru. Trade between Costa Rica and China has grown by 70 percent since a free trade agreement signed in 2011 took effect.
- 29 November – Shoppers looking for bargains on Black Friday (Viernes Negro) found the discounts were not as competitive as they expected.

=== December ===
- 6 December – Costa Rica were placed in Group D with England, Italy, and Uruguay for the World Cup 2014 tournament in a draw which took place in Costa do Sauípe in Brazil.
- 8 December – Feast of the Immaculate Conception.
- 9 December – El Financiero newspaper revealed that the mayor of San José and presidential candidate Johnny Araya Monge wrongly claimed on his website to have a Harvard University degree. The claim was removed following the exposure.
- 11 December – Schoolchildren celebrated the Festival of Joy (Fiesta de la Alegría) and the closure of schools for the holidays until 10 February by playing, dancing, and bursting piñatas.
- 13 December – The International Court of Justice rejected a claim by Nicaragua that the construction by Costa Rica of the 130-kilometre Route 1856 along the Río San Juan border river was causing environmental damage.
- 14 December – The 18th annual Festival of Lights (Festival de la Luz) marked the start of Christmas in San José on the second Saturday of December with a parade of floats, bands, and fireworks from La Sabana to Plaza de la Democracia. It was first celebrated on 13 December 1996.
- 15–16 December – Route 32 from San José to Limón was closed by landslides after heavy rain, according to Consejo Nacional de Vialidad (CONAVI).
- 16 December – A legally-mandatory holiday from political campaigning began, until January 2. During this interval, enforced by the Supreme Elections Tribunal, political parties may not publish advertisements, and campaigning in person is tightly limited.
- 16 December – A survey of 131 countries between 2006 and 2012 revealed that the median Costa Rican per capita income was $2,232 per annum, lower than the global median of $2,920.
- 17 December – The 49th annual Vuelta Ciclista a Costa Rica (Tour of Costa Rica bicycle race) got underway in Limón. The 1,530 kilometre race ends in San José on 29 December.
- 19 December – Legislative Assembly deputies began their 46-day holiday, but without settling the future of the in vitro fertilisation (IVF) bill. Twelve congressmen blocked discussion by walking out of a plenary session of the Assembly to deprive it of a quorum, defying the latest deadline set by the Inter-American Court of Human Rights to legalize IVF. Costa Rica's Sala IV (Constitutional Court) banned it in 2000 under pressure from the Catholic Church and conservative lawmakers.
- 20 December – Holiday travel saw 20,000 people crossing the border into Nicaragua in two days with as many as 14,000 people per day expected on Saturday and Sunday, December 21 and 22. Last year, more than 200,000 people crossed the frontier in the second half of December and early January.
- 22 December – An earthquake struck Finca Georgina in Varablanca at 4.52 pm. The Red Sismológica Nacional (National Seismological Network) reported the strength of the tremor as magnitude 4.6, at a depth of 80 kilometres, while the Observatorio Vulcanológico y Sismológico de Costa Rica (Volcanological and Seismological Observatory of Costa Rica) described it as a magnitude 4.8 earthquake at a depth of 100 km.
- 25 December – Christmas Day, a national holiday.
- 25 December–5 January – Celebration of the annual Fiestas de Zapote (in Spanish) which takes place annually in the Zapote District, San José.
- December 26 – Día del Caballista Nacional (National Horse Rider's Day): 600,000 people attended the Tope Nacional de Caballos, an annual equestrian parade of 5,000 horse riders in San José, from 11.30 am until 6 pm from Plaza González Víquez along Paseo Colón and Second Avenue to La Sabana.
- December 27 – The annual Carnaval de Desamparados took place in the San José suburb of Desamparados with bands, floats, clowns, stilt-walkers, custom cars, musicians, dancers, cheerleading groups, and masquerades parading from Colegio Nuestra Señora de Desamparados to the Villa Olímpica.
- 29 December – Juan Carlos Rojas won the Vuelta Ciclista a Costa Rica, becoming the first rider to win three times. Elias Vega and Bryan Villalobos came second and third.
- 31 December – New Year's Eve.

== Sport ==
=== International football ===
==== Copa Centroamericana ====
- 18 January – Costa Rica 1–0 Belize
- 20 January – Costa Rica 2–0 Nicaragua
- 22 January – Costa Rica 1–1 Guatemala
- 25 January – Costa Rica 1–0 El Salvador (semifinal)
- 27 January – Costa Rica 1–0 Honduras (final)

==== World Cup Qualifiers ====
- 6 February – Panama 2–2 Costa Rica
- 22 March – United States 1–0 Costa Rica
- 26 March – Costa Rica 2–0 Jamaica
- 7 June – Costa Rica 1–0 Honduras
- 11 June – Mexico 0–0 Costa Rica
- 18 June – Costa Rica 2–0 Panama
- 6 September – Costa Rica 3–1 United States
- 10 September – Jamaica 1–1 Costa Rica
- 11 October – Honduras 1–0 Costa Rica
- 15 October – Costa Rica 2–1 Mexico

==== Gold Cup ====
- 9 July – Costa Rica 3–0 Cuba
- 13 June – Costa Rica 1–0 Belize
- 16 July – United States 1–0 Costa Rica
- 20 July – Honduras 1–0 Costa Rica (quarter final)

==== Friendly matches ====
- 28 May – Canada 0–1 Costa Rica
- 14 August – Dominican Republic 0–4 Costa Rica
- 19 November – Australia 1–0 Costa Rica
