= 2015 in Costa Rica =

- Decades: 1990s; 2000s; 2010s; 2020s
- See also: Other events of 2015; Timeline of Costa Rican history

Events in the year 2015 in Costa Rica.

== Incumbents ==
- President – Laura Chinchilla Miranda (Partido Liberación Nacional – PLN) until 8 May;

succeeded by Luis Guillermo Solís Rivera (Partido Acción Ciudadana – PAC).

- First Vice President – Alfio Piva Mesén (PLN) until 8 May;

succeeded by Helio Fallas Venegas (PAC).

- Second Vice President – Luis Liberman Ginsburg (PLN) until 8 May;

succeeded by Ana Helena Chacón Echeverría (PAC).

- President of the Legislative Assembly – Luis Fernando Mendoza Jiménez (PLN) until 1 May;

succeeded by Henry Mora Jiménez (PAC).

== Events ==
=== January ===
- January 8 – A Princess Tours catamaran, Pura Vida Princess, caught fire and capsized off the coast of Punta Leona while carrying 98 passengers and ten crew. The Red Cross confirmed that three tourists were killed.

=== March ===
- 12 March – Four eruptions of the Turrialba Volcano spread ash over San José and caused the closure at 16:00 of Juan Santamaría International Airport, 70 kilometres to the west.
- 14 March – Continuing eruptions of the Turrialba Volcano persuaded President Luis Guillermo Solís to announce the postponement of his planned trip to France, Spain, and Italy to ensure, as he put it, "that everything's being handled with the upmost transparency".
- 19 March – The famous fighting bull "Malacrianza" died of cardiac arrest in Guanacaste.

=== April ===
- 23 April – Continuing eruptions of the Turrialba Volcano 67 kilometres northeast of San José caused Juan Santamaría International Airport to close and flights to be cancelled. The airport reopened at 04:00 the following morning.
