= SIGLA =

States and Institutions of Governance in Latin America (SIGLA)
- Your gateway to governance in Latin America.
- Website: www.sigladata.org

States and Institutions of Governance in Latin America (SIGLA) is an online multilingual database that provides systematic information on legal and political institutions in Latin America. SIGLA is hosted by the Center for Latin American Studies (CLAS) within the Edmund A. Walsh School of Foreign Service at Georgetown University in Washington, D.C.

Launched in April 2022, the SIGLA database serves as a successor to the Political Database of the Americas (PDBA), also based at CLAS within Georgetown University's School of Foreign Service.

== History ==
SIGLA's icon.

The PBDA launched in 1995 as a joint project between Georgetown's Center for Latin American Studies and the Secretariat for Political Affairs at the Organization of American States. Developed soon after a wave of democratization in Latin America, the PDBA focused on constitutions and democratic institutions in the Americas. In 2010, new investment in the project ceased and the PDBA was decommissioned, leaving a vacuum for scholars and others interested in Latin American political institutions. SIGLA launched (beta version) in April 2022 as its successor.

SIGLA narrows the PDBA's geographic focus to 20 Latin American countries and expands its substantive focus to include data on legal as well as political institutions, reflecting the importance of the rule of law and the quality of democratic governance, as well as political stability, in the region of Latin America. The beta version of the SIGLA database, at launch, included current information in English on the Constitution, Codes, the Legislature, the Executive, and Elections in Brazil, Colombia, and Mexico, as well as on a range of Latin American and Latin America-focused International Institutions.

== Mission ==
Free to use, SIGLA democratizes access to systematic and comparable data about states and institutions of governance in the Latin American region. In so doing, SIGLA aims to enhance government transparency and empower scholars, government actors, business leaders, and civil society organizations in the region and around the world to conduct empirical research and make well-informed policy, commercial, and advocacy decisions.

== Objective ==
SIGLA seeks to provide accurate and authoritative information on key aspects of political and legal institutions in Latin America. In addition, SIGLA identifies the key laws, decrees, and other elements of the legal framework governing the actions and procedures of each institution.

Ultimately, SIGLA will provide cross-nationally comparable, current and historical, qualitative and quantitative data on dozens of institutions of governance. The database will include information on 20 Latin American countries in English, Spanish, and Portuguese. Over time, SIGLA will also identify institutional partners in Latin America with which to collaborate on data collection and interpretation.

== Usage and methodology ==
Through an iterative process, SIGLA established a list of basic variables relevant for each institution included in the database relating to general characteristics, functioning, institutional positioning and interaction within the state, members, and leaders. Each institution also includes customized variables to capture additional data that are critical to understanding the institution's structure or functioning.

The SIGLA research team manually collects and curates all of the data that SIGLA provides. The information SIGLA offers for each variable in the database is structured in “triples,” i.e., matrices with three components: SIGLA’s Answer (information corresponding to the variable composed by a SIGLA researcher), Original Text (excerpt(s) from official source(s) pertaining to the variable), and Source (references to the official source(s) used). The research team keeps SIGLA data current through periodic review, updating, and verification. More details about SIGLA's methodology and data can be found in SIGLA's Research Methodology and Technical Codebook, published on the SIGLA website.

Users can view SIGLA data by country or by institution. They also can compare a given institution across countries. The site also includes a custom browse feature allowing users to view and download data associated with any combination of variables across countries and institutions.

== Funding ==
SIGLA is supported by funding from various units of Georgetown University, including the Office of the Provost, the Office of the Vice-President for Global Engagement, the Georgetown Americas Institute, the School of Foreign Service, Georgetown College, the Massive Data Institute, and the Latin America Initiative. SIGLA has also received funding from the Institute for Humane Studies through its Hayek Fund for Scholars.
