= 2014 in Costa Rica =

- Decades: 1990s; 2000s; 2010s; 2020s
- See also: Other events of 2014; Timeline of Costa Rican history

Events in the year 2014 in Costa Rica.

== Incumbents ==
- President – Laura Chinchilla Miranda (Partido Liberación Nacional – PLN) until 8 May;

succeeded by Luis Guillermo Solís Rivera (Partido Acción Ciudadana – PAC).

- First Vice President – Alfio Piva Mesén (PLN) until 8 May;

succeeded by Helio Fallas Venegas (PAC).

- Second Vice President – Luis Liberman Ginsburg (PLN) until 8 May;

succeeded by Ana Helena Chacón Echeverría (PAC).

- President of the Legislative Assembly – Luis Fernando Mendoza Jiménez (PLN) until 1 May;

succeeded by Henry Mora Jiménez (PAC).

== Events ==
=== January ===
- 1 January – New Year's Day, a national holiday.
- 5 January – The annual Fiestas de Zapote (in Spanish) which began on Christmas Day came to an end, but not before an improvisada was thrown into the air by a 500 kilogram bull, but she was unhurt. Between Christmas Day and New Year's Day alone, 135 improvisados required hospital treatment at an average cost to the Caja Costarricense de Seguro Social of ¢660,938 each.
- January 15–27 – The annual Palmares Festival took place offering "bullfights" (which involve improvisados running from bulls), carnival rides, a famous tope (horse parade) lasting for hours and involving thousands of riders on 16 January, concerts, a carnival parade with bands and costumed salsa, merengue, cumbia, and mambo dancing troupes, lots of drinking, and a closing fireworks display. About a million people or roughly one fifth of the population were expected to attend.
- 23 January – Twelve cantons banned the sale of alcohol on the day of the forthcoming elections on 2 February in accordance with Article 26 of Law 9047. The cantons were Alajuelita, Aserrí, Athens, Brokers, Cartago, Dota, Guácimo, Los Chiles, Poas, San Ramon, and Upala. San José imposed an even longer ban, from 1 to 3 February. Other cantons decided against the prohibition: Buenos Aires, Desamparados, Garabito, Golfito, La Cruz, León Cortes, Naranjo, Parrita, Talamanca, Tibás, and Turrialba; while yet others remained undecided. Nevertheless, San José decided not to enforce its own ban because placing closure notices on bars on a previous occasion was tedious and cost ₡6 million.
- 27 January – President Laura Chinchilla Miranda attended the presidential inauguration ceremony of Juan Orlando Hernández of Honduras. Afterwards, she became the first Costa Rican president to visit Cuba in 52 years when she attended a meeting of the Community of Latin American and Caribbean States. Costa Rica broke diplomatic relations with Cuba on 10 September 1961. President Óscar Arias Sánchez resumed bilateral relations on 18 March 2009 following the Cold War political and ideological differences between the two nations.
- 29 January
  - During her visit to Havana, President Chinchilla avoided direct criticism of Cuba but, during a speech in the presence of Raúl Castro, called on governments to be more open to initiatives by civil society. She also referred to the commitment of the Community of Latin American and Caribbean States to democracy and human rights. Meanwhile, her Director of Foreign Policy, Linyi Baidal, met with Cuban dissidents at the Costa Rican embassy in Havana. In another pleasing gesture to Cuban opposition leaders, Chinchilla spoke of the forthcoming "free and competitive" general election in Costa Rica.
  - At a service including religious figures gathered at the Metropolitan Cathedral in San José, the Bishop of Cartago, Francisco Ulloa, reminded voters in the forthcoming election to support candidates who were anti-abortion and anti-gay marriage. Juan Luis Calvo, president of the Evangelical Alliance called on the government to rethink guidelines on sexuality published by the Ministry of Public Education.

=== February ===
- 2 February – First Sunday in February: Costa Ricans cast their ballots for a new president, two vice presidents, and 57 Legislative Assembly lawmakers. No presidential candidate won 40 percent of the vote so the two leading candidates, Luis Guillermo Solís (30.64%) and Johnny Araya Monge (29.71%), proceeded to a second round vote to take place on 6 April. In the Legislative Assembly elections, the Partido Liberación Nacional won 18 Assembly seats (a loss of five); Partido Acción Ciudadana won 14 (a gain of three); Frente Amplio won nine (+8); Partido Unidad Social Cristiana won eight (+2); Movimiento Libertario won three (−6); Renovación Costarricense won two (+1); and the parties Partido Accesibilidad Sin Exclusión (−3), Alianza Demócrata Cristiana (+1), and Restauración Nacional (no change) won a single seat each.
- 4 February – A manual recount began of votes cast in the presidential election because the difference between the two leading candidates did not exceed two percent. The latest count showed Luis Guillermo Solís with 30.95 percent of the vote, and Johnny Araya having 29.59 percent. By law, the ballot count must be completed within 30 days of the election.
- 5 February – Award-winning investigative editor and pioneer of data journalism at La Nación, Giannina Segnini, resigned after 20 years working at the newspaper. She said that opportunities to conduct independent journalism had been reduced consistently in the past two years, while editorial decisions she described as unjournalistic made it impossible for her to continue.
- 6 February – The new school year began with children returning from holidays on the 6th (Wednesday) and 10th (Monday) of February. The school year will be 200 days long (41 teaching weeks) until 11 December, with a break from 1 to 12 July.
- 8–10 February – Laura Chinchilla attended the final international summit of her presidency when she took part in the eighth summit of the Pacific Alliance in Cartagena de Indias, Colombia. She signed a protocol at a plenary session on the 10th finalising the process of Costa Rica's accession to full membership of the Alliance.
- 14–23 February – The annual Puntarenas Carnival was celebrated, consisting of concerts, street dancing, band and horse parades, a national beach volleyball competition, cimarrona band and clown performances, bullfights, street theatre, a fashion show, illuminations, and fireworks.
- 17 February – The Tribunal Supremo de Elecciones announced the final result in the first round vote of the presidential election held on February 2: Luis Guillermo Solís won 30.6% of the vote while Johnny Araya won 29.7%, with 19,232 votes separating them. José María Villata received 17.24%; Otto Guevara won 11.33%; and Rodolfo Piza gained 6.01%.
- 22 February–2 March – The Fiestas Cívicas Liberia took place, an annual festival in Liberia, including such diverse activities as horseriders parades, parades of bulls, bull riding, concerts, dances, free fairground rides for poor children and residents of old peoples' homes, drama performances, and fireworks displays.
- 25 February – Editor-in-Chief of La Nación, Yanancy Noguera, resigned after 24 years working at the newspaper. She said that recent "integrated newsroom" work flow changes had reduced her role and relevance, and introduced differences of vision between her and corporate management.
- 25 February – A phreatic explosion occurred at Poás Volcano sending a column of steam, water, ash, and small rocks 300 metres into the air. It occurred when magma reacted with water in the lake inside the crater. A spokeswoman for Observatorio Vulcanológico y Sismológico de Costa Rica said the activity was normal although the height of the column was unusual.

=== March ===
- 5 March – A candidate in the presidential election second round, Johnny Araya Monge, withdrew from his election campaign and was designated leader of his political party by Partido Liberación Nacional deputies, to form an opposition to a new government led by Partido Acción Ciudadana. Araya's withdrawal followed the publication of an opinion survey by Semanario Universidad showing his opponent Luis Guillermo Solís leading the poll at 64.4 percent, with Araya trailing at a distant 20.9 percent. The political campaign continued as mandated by the constitution, but without electoral activity by Araya.
- 9 March – National Oxherds Day (Día Nacional del Boyero).
- 19 March – Saint Joseph's Day.
- 30 March – The presidential election runoff campaign ended a week before polling day with leading candidate Luis Guillermo Solís of the Citizen Action Party holding a rally at the Plaza de Guarantías Sociales in San José to encourage his supporters to get out the vote. This Sunday was the final day when political parties could distribute or pay for election advertising.

=== April ===
- 6 April – First Sunday in April: In accordance with Article 138 of the constitution, a second round of voting took place in the presidential election, only the second time a run-off has occurred in the nation's history. The first was in 2002. Voting took place from 6am to 6pm, and turnout was low, at around 57 percent. Luis Guillermo Solís Rivera was elected in a landslide, winning 77.88 percent of the vote.
- 11 April – Battle of Rivas Day, a national holiday.
- 17 April – Maundy Thursday, a national holiday.
- 18 April – Good Friday, a national holiday.
- 19 April – Aboriginal Day.

=== May ===
- 1 May
  - Labour Day (May Day), a national holiday.
  - In accordance with Article 11 of the Rules of the Legislative Assembly, newly elected legislators conducted their first parliamentary session. Henry Mora Jiménez was sworn in as the new president of the Directory of the Legislative Assembly with 13 votes from Partido Acción Ciudadana (PAC), nine from Frente Amplio, and eight from the Partido Unidad Social Cristiana (PUSC), a total of 30 votes, one more than the minimum required to win a seat on the Directory. Earlier, Renovación Costarricense withdrew their support because the PAC refused to delay for one year discussions of bills on homosexual civil unions and on abortion. Mora Jiménez was joined by Marcela Guerrero Campos (PAC) as vice president; Nidia María Jiménez Vásquez (PAC), first pro-secretary; Laura María Garro Sánchez (PAC), second pro-secretary; Luis Vásquez (PUSC), first secretary; and Jorge Rodríguez Araya (PUSC), second secretary.
  - The Banco Nacional introduced a 1.5 percent charge for deposits made in coins.
- 8 May
  - In accordance with Articles 136 and 137 of the Constitution, Luis Guillermo Solís Rivera was sworn in as the 47th President of Costa Rica following the swearing-in of Vice Presidents Helio Fallas Venegas and Ana Helena Chacón Echeverría. The 90-minute ceremony began at 10am, with the swearing of oaths before the Legislative Assembly at noon in the Estadio Nacional during which Laura Chinchilla Miranda delivered the presidential sash to her successor.
  - San José was cut off from the Caribbean Sea for more than twelve hours following a landslide at 8pm at the 39 kilometre mark on Route 32. Forty drivers were trapped for more than 12 hours and a traffic jam extended all the way back to the capital. The route was finally opened to traffic at noon the following day.
- 23 May – The annual Day of the Farmer (Día del Agricultor) was celebrated, having been postponed by the government's Department of Agriculture from 15 May, the traditional date since 1968, which is the feast day of Isidore the Farmer (Isidro Labrador), the Spanish patron saint of farmers.

=== June ===
- 15 June – Father's Day (third Sunday of June).

=== July ===
- 4 July – Día Nacional del Felino Silvestre.
- 25 July – Guanacaste Day, a national holiday.

=== August ===
- 1 August – National Science and Technology Day (August is Science and Technology Month).
- 2 August – Feast of Nuestra Señora de los Ángeles, patron saint of Costa Rica.
- 15 August – Mother's Day, a national holiday.
- 24 August – National Parks Day.
- 31 August – Day of the Black Person and Afro-Costa Rican Culture (Día de la Persona Negra y La Cultura Afro Costarricense).

=== September ===
- 9 September – Children's Day.
- 14 September – Annual Parade of Lanterns (Desfile de faroles) to celebrate El Grito de la Independencia.
- 15 September – Independence Day, a national holiday.

=== October ===
- 12 October – Columbus Day.

=== November ===
National Flag Day on 12 November

- 2 November – All Soul's Day.
- 12 November – National Flag Day (Día del Pabellón Nacional).
- 22 November – Teacher's Day.
- 23 November – The seventeenth annual Fiesta de Música Boyera y Campesina.
- 30 November – The eighteenth Oxcart Parade (Entrada de Santos y Desfile de Boyeros por San José) takes place in San José, an annual event on the last Sunday in November.

=== December ===
- 8 December – Feast of the Immaculate Conception.
- 10 December – Schoolchildren celebrate the Festival of Joy (Fiesta de la Alegría) and the closure of schools for the holidays until 10 February by playing, dancing, and bursting piñatas.
- 13 December – The 19th annual Festival of Lights (Festival de la Luz) marks the start of Christmas in San José on the second Saturday of December with a parade of floats, bands, and fireworks from La Sabana to Plaza de la Democracia.
- 25 December – Christmas Day, a national holiday.
- 25 December–1 January – Celebration of the annual Fiestas de Zapote (in Spanish).
- 26 December – The annual equestrian parade, the Tope Nacional de Caballos, is held in San José.
- 27 December – The annual Carnival Nacional street festival is held in San José with live music, food, traditional costumes, decorations, fireworks, and parades.
- 31 December – New Year's Eve.

== Sport ==
=== International football ===
Friendly matches

- 22 January – Chile 4–0 Costa Rica.
- 25 January – Costa Rica 0–1 South Korea.
- 5 March – Costa Rica 2–1 Paraguay.
- 2 June – Costa Rica 1–3 Japan.
- 6 June – Costa Rica 1–1 Ireland.
- 10 October – Oman 3–4 Costa Rica.
- 14 October – South Korea 1–3 Costa Rica.
- 13 November – Uruguay 3–3 (PSO: 6–7) Costa Rica.

World Cup 2014

Group stage

- 14 June – Uruguay 1–3 Costa Rica.
- 20 June – Italy 0–1 Costa Rica.
- 24 June – Costa Rica 0–0 England.

Second round

- 29 June – Costa Rica 1–1 Greece (Costa Rica won 5–3 in penalties after extra time).

Quarter finals

- 5 July – Netherlands 0–0 Costa Rica (Netherlands won 4–3 in penalties after extra time).

Copa Centroamericana 2014

- 3 September – Costa Rica 3–0 Nicaragua.
- 7 September – Costa Rica 2–2 Panama.

Final

- 13 September – Guatemala 1–2 Costa Rica.
