= Murder of Jairo Mora Sandoval =

Costa Rican environmentalist

Jairo Mora Sandoval
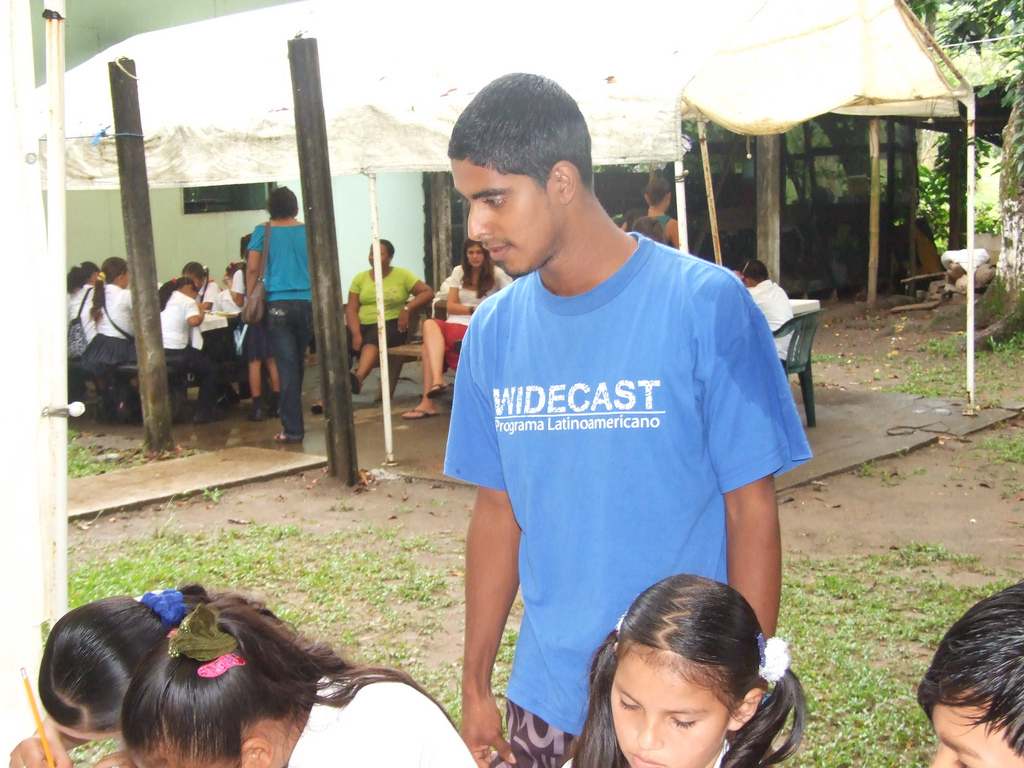
- Mora supervising a WIDECAST event in 2010
- Born: March 22, 1987; Limón, Costa Rica
- Died: May 31, 2013 (aged 26); Moín Beach, Limón province, Costa Rica
- Cause of death: Murder by asphyxiation and head trauma
- Occupation: Environmentalist
- Employer: Paradero Eco-Tour
- Organization: Wider Caribbean Sea Turtle Conservation Network

Jairo Mora Sandoval (March 22, 1987 – May 31, 2013) was a Costa Rican environmentalist who was murdered while attempting to protect leatherback turtle nests. Just before midnight on May 30, 2013, Mora and four female volunteers were abducted by a group of masked men. The women eventually escaped and informed the police. Mora's bound and beaten body was found on the beach the next morning. An autopsy determined he died by asphyxiation after suffering a blow to the head.

Sea turtles are protected by law in Costa Rica, but poaching remains common. Locals take eggs, which are believed to be an aphrodisiac, and sell them on the black market. The egg trade has been linked to drug trafficking and organized crime. Environmentalists working in Limón say they are often threatened for trying to protect turtle eggs. Jairo Mora was one such environmentalist working in the area.

In the wake of Mora's death, the organization he worked with cancelled beach patrol efforts in Costa Rica. His death attracted international attention, including a statement from the United Nations and multiple rewards for information on the case. In Costa Rica, his death led to calls for reform of environmental policy. On June 4, the government met with environmentalists to discuss potential changes to policy. A plan submitted by environmentalists and endorsed by Environment Minister René Castro would set up a new protected area and grant park rangers more authority to stop poachers, among other changes. On June 5, vigils were held across Costa Rica in honor of Mora. On June 18, the government announced the allocation of ₡20 million (US$40,000), which was later upped to ₡30 million (US$60,000), to memorialize Mora.

== Background ==
Costa Rica has a good reputation for wildlife conservation in general, and sea turtles have been protected by national legislation in Costa Rica since 1966. The country prides itself on its natural beauty and the nation's economy depends heavily on ecotourism. Tens of thousands of people visit the country every year to observe its sea turtles. The turtles of Costa Rica include the leatherback turtle, a critically endangered species.

The Marine Turtle Population Law of 2002 assigns a three-year prison sentence to anyone who "kills, hunts, captures, decapitates, or disturbs marine turtles". Even so, it is common for locals to harvest eggs for personal use or for sale in local bars due to supposed aphrodisiac qualities. A poacher can make up to $300 in one night, selling eggs for about $1 each on the black market. Eggs obtained from poaching are often sold to drug dealers or traded for drugs. Poachers are often armed, usually with knives, but sometimes with assault rifles. In the impoverished Limón area, locals claim that police are either colluding with, or afraid of, drug traffickers and poachers. Poaching has been cited as a major reason for declining sea turtle populations around the world.

Although poaching is not new, conservationists report that it is on the rise in Costa Rica. In the period leading up to Mora's death, poaching became an attractive side income for drug traffickers. In 2012, a group of six men used assault rifles and hand guns to break into a protected nursery run by the nonprofit environmentalist group Wider Caribbean Sea Turtle Conservation Network (WIDECAST). The men tied up and gagged the volunteers, then smashed or stole a total 1520 sea turtle eggs. After the incident, police began accompanying environmentalists on their nightly beach walks. It was later revealed that the incident was intended as a warning for environmentalists to stay off the beaches, according to WIDECAST's Latin American director Didiher Chacón. According to Limón police chief Erick Calderón, 21 people were arrested in 2012 on charges related to turtle poaching.

== Life and career of Jairo Mora ==
Jairo Mora was a research assistant who worked for Paradero Eco-Tour, a state-sponsored animal rescue group run by Vanessa Lizano. He was born in Limón on March 22, 1987, to a Nicaraguan father and a Costa Rican mother. From an early age, he was involved in volunteer work.

Mora regularly volunteered with WIDECAST, which coordinates efforts to protect turtle eggs across Central America. Mora and other WIDECAST volunteers walked Costa Rican beaches nightly to ward off egg thieves. In 2011, the group protected about 3% of all turtle nests laid at Moín Beach in Costa Rica; in 2012, it increased to 30%. Conservation efforts on Moín Beach, which Mora headed, collected 1,500 leatherback turtle nests, the most from any beach in Costa Rica.

According to the owner of Paradero Eco Tours Vanessa Lizano, her organization often received threats from poachers because of its conservation efforts. In 2012, Mora was personally threatened at gunpoint "to back off and stop the walks". He and Lizano were also subject to intimidation efforts throughout the 2012 nesting season. "Both Jairo and I were being followed by motorbikes with guys carrying AK-47s," Lizano recalled. After a threat against her family, Lizano relocated from Limón to San José.

At the start of the 2013 leatherback turtle nesting season in April, police decreased their involvement with conservation efforts. Guards were on duty four days a week, but no longer personally escorted volunteers. On April 23, 2013, Mora asked supporters on Facebook to petition the police for more help. "Send messages to the police so they come to Moín Beach", he wrote. "Tell them not to be afraid but to come armed ... we need help and fast." On April 28, Mora told La Nación that environmentalists were being threatened "by a mafia that was looting the nests for eggs". According to friends, Mora received frequent death threats, including an incident just weeks before his death where he was threatened at gunpoint.

On May 5, La Nación accompanied Mora and Lizano on a typical night's work. Mora spoke about feeling alone and unprotected in his struggle to save the turtles. Denying reports that police had stepped up their efforts he said: "If a guard or policeman says he supports us, he is lying." La Nación confirmed that no police were assigned to patrol the beach that evening. When asked if he was afraid, Mora said "Yes, it's scary, the worst could happen at any time." After a May 6 incident where poachers stole a large number of nests, Limón police and the Coast Guard began patrolling Moín Beach more thoroughly.

== Death ==
On the evening of May 30, 2013, Mora and four female volunteers – three from the United States and one from Spain – were patrolling Moín Beach in Limón province, Costa Rica. At approximately 11:30 pm Mora stepped out of his jeep to move a tree trunk and was ambushed by at least five masked men carrying guns. The men drove the car with the four women to a nearby abandoned house and took their phones, money, and other belongings. Three of the men drove off with Mora. The women were tied up and left in an abandoned house; they eventually freed themselves and went to the police.

Five police officers were on duty the night of Mora's murder, and they had been in radio contact with him about an hour before his death. However, according to Calderón, the police were present to increase "the number of eyes and ears on the beach", not to protect the conservationists. He also noted that the beach is too large to constantly monitor all of it in the dark.

Mora's naked body was found on the beach the next morning. His body was found beaten and with his hands tied behind his back. Autopsy results revealed that he had died from asphyxiation after being struck in the back of the head, likely with an object found at the site of his murder. Earlier reports incorrectly stated he had been shot. Mora was 26 at the time of his death.

== Reaction ==
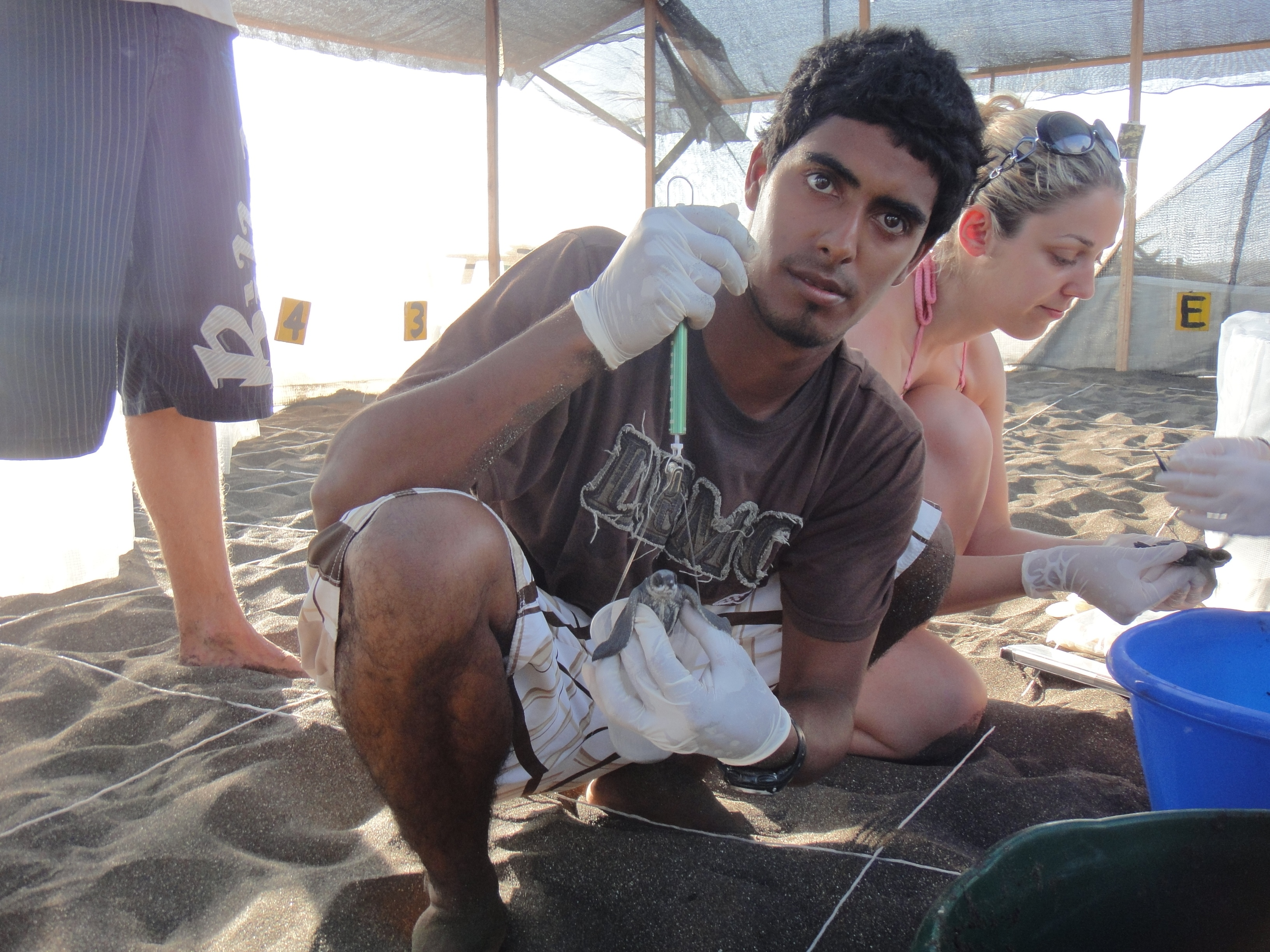
Mora in the beach hatchery at Ostional beach on the Pacific coast with fellow volunteers. 2011

Judicial Investigation Police were unable to immediately determine a motive for Mora's death. Lizano suspects poachers were involved, saying Mora was targeted for protecting the turtle nests. Chacón said drug traffickers, who often are also poachers, were likely behind the killing. Given Mora's recent calls for police help, "it seems like it was an act of revenge", he said.

Chacón said he was "very hurt" by Mora's death. "It's not possible that citizens who protect nature have to suffer from this type of attacks", he said. President Laura Chinchilla called on police and the judicial system to solve what she described as the "despicable murder" of Mora. A statement from the United States Embassy in Costa Rica remembered Mora as "a committed Costa Rican environmentalist" and called his death "senseless". The United Nations released a statement sending condolences and recognizing Mora's "noble work" to protect "an essential part of Costa Rica's and the world's biodiversity."

Todd Steiner, executive director of the Turtle Island Restoration Network raised money for a $10,000 reward for information leading to the arrest of those responsible. "Jairo’s murderers must be brought to justice so that [people] know that this will never be tolerated," said Steiner in a statement. "The whole world is watching to make sure the Costa Rican government brings these thugs to justice and makes sea turtle nesting beaches safe for conservationists to do their work." A petition started by the Sea Turtle Restoration Project calling for swift justice generated more than 10,000 signatures within two weeks.

Mora death raised fears that the country's economy would be hurt by reduced tourism, leading Univision to describe the situation as "an internal crisis". Commentary published by the Costa Rican Times alleged that the true culprits would never be found, saying whoever was blamed would be a scapegoat offered up by the drug traffickers. The government "is happy letting the Caribbean side of Costa Rica lose all tourism" continued the commentary by Dan Stevens. "Maybe the group Sea Turtle Conservation with Guns should be formed to fight back." An editorial published by the Tico Times asked why it took a murder to get the government to act. "Mora reached out for help before he was killed, and no one came to the rescue, no matter what political spin is put on it", said the author. Mora's death, suggested the author, shows that "the drug traffickers are winning", that crime is out of control in Limón, and that "the bad guys operate with near impunity." The editorial concluded by imploring Costa Ricans to re-evaluate their personal environmental habits and support environmental groups that keep fighting. The Guápiles Biofestival, an arts festival held each year during early June, was also dedicated to Mora.

On June 3, Vice President Alfio Piva described Mora's death as an "accident" due to Limón's high crime rate on live TV. He quickly retracted the statement, saying his words had been misunderstood. "I only meant to recognize that the area where this happened unfortunately has a high murder rate and that there is high risk when working in an area where there is drug trafficking", he explained. Unsatisfied by the explanation, environmental groups called for a public apology. On June 4, members of the Legislative Assembly said that Piva's comments had "dishonored the entire country". Led by José María Villalta and Juan Carlos Mendoza, opposition party members called for Piva's resignation. "We are really full of anger and annoyance. We are embarrassed as a nation", said Mendoza.

On June 5, vigils in honor of Mora were held in at least six Costa Rica cities to coincide with World Environment Day. Ecologist Federation president Mauricio Álvarez, who helped organize the vigils, said "We are asking for justice for Jairo’s murder and ...demand a halt to the impunity that has reigned over too many threats to ecologists, farmers and indigenous groups." Despite rainy weather, hundred of people showed up to carry signs, light candles, and place stuffed turtles on the beach. Leaflets blamed police and the government for Mora's death and demanded swift justice. Among those in attendance were Roberto Molina, secretary general of the Environmental Ministry's labor union, and José Lino Chavez, Vice Minister of Waters and Oceans.

On June 6, Sea Shepherd Conservation Society founder Paul Watson offered an additional $30,000 reward for information leading to the capture of Mora's murderer. He said the money would come from his personal wealth, not from Sea Shepherd, and that he had sold a vehicle to fund the reward. Watson's pledge, together with additional funds raised by Steiner, brought the total reward to $56,000. A separate memorial fund to assist Mora's family and continue conservation efforts in his name raised $7,000. In early July, Costa Rican businessman Roy Rivera said he was working to raise funds to increase the information reward.

Watson, who is wanted by Costa Rica for skipping bail on charges related to a 2002 incident, said Mora's death proves that his own life would be in "great danger" if he ever returned to Costa Rica. "The authorities were very quick to respond to Japan and issued an arrest warrant for the protection of sharks ... however, when it comes to a horrible murder of a compassionate conservationist, the government does nothing." Later in June, Watson announced that his organization's next boat would be named the S.S. Jairo Mora Sandoval. "We do not want the name of this courageous and passionate young man to be forgotten", he said on Facebook.

On June 12, the Ocean Futures Society joined the chorus of international voices calling for swift justice. "This crime, in the Limón province, has shaken the consciousnesses of many internationally," wrote Ruben Arvizú, the society's Latin American director. Arvizú said that Costa Rica should make the case a national priority. On June 18, Costa Rican rapper Yaco released a song entitled "Playa Roja" (Red Beach) about Mora. Yaco, who is known for using his songs as social commentary, released the song via social media, saying it was "not a commercial release".

At the June 26–28 Inter-American Convention on the Protection and Conservation of Sea Turtles (IAC), Mora's death was a popular subject. A declaration from the Mexican delegation read, "As sea turtles are a shared resource, criminal activity that prevents [on-site] protection efforts from taking place in one country presents an urgent concern to all range states." A convention floor speech and a second written declaration also discussed Mora's death.

== Aftermath ==
Following Mora's death, WIDECAST suspended beach patrol operations. "We can't risk human lives for this project," Chacón said. "But this is probably the exact result that the killers were hoping for." Many volunteers quit the project after Mora's death, leaving the organization 200 people short staffed. Organizations such as WIDECAST depend heavily on foreign volunteers. According to Chacón, the future of his organization will be in jeopardy if the situation continues. Aimee Leslie, who oversees sea turtle efforts for the World Wildlife Foundation called the situation "a critical point for conservation" in Costa Rica and "a national security issue. She said that conservation efforts were already difficult without being scared for one's life. Lizano said she was in negotiations with the police for armed escorts on future patrols, but vowed to continue to work even if they refused. "If we forget about this beach, then Jairo died for nothing," she said.

On June 3, Calderón remarked that police would continue to support environmentalists and increase their presence on Moín Beach. The next day police arrested two armed men who were allegedly trying to steal turtle eggs from the same beach where Mora was killed. Also on June 4, a group of three men and a minor was arrested on similar charges. Subsequently, Limón began to dispatch twenty police officers nightly to escort conservationists and patrol the beaches. In spite of increased police presence Lizano remarked, on June 11, "Every night all of the [turtle] nests are raided. It is still pretty much the same even though we walk with police."

Prompted by the death of Mora, dozens of environmentalists met with the Ministry of Environment, Energy and Telecommunications (MINAE), headed by René Castro, to discuss their dissatisfaction with current conservation efforts on June 4. Their requests included punishing those responsible for Mora's death, greater criminal penalties for poaching, and more efforts by MINAE to fight egg poachers. Castro suggested implementing a plan submitted by WIDECAST. The plan would give park rangers jurisdiction to arrest poachers on Moín Beach and create a code of conduct for beach visitors nationwide. It would also increase penalties for poaching, name a new protected area after Mora, and set up a memorial fund in his name. The proposal was initially met with enthusiasm, but it later gave way to complaints about lax environmental enforcement nationwide. "This isn't only happening in Moín and this not only happening with turtle conservation," remarked Molina. Deputy Minister of Security Celso Gamboa, who was also in attendance, promised to increase security forces in Limón.

On June 6, the Legislative Assembly unanimously passed a motion to form a special committee investigating Mora's death. "It is important to acknowledge that the death of Jairo is not only the fault of these bands of criminals, but also the fault of the state," remarked the motion's sponsor José María Villalta On June 19, Castro, Chávez, the heads of several environmental groups, and members of Mora's family, met to work out the details of the earlier proposals. After the meeting, Castro announced that ₡20 million (approximately US$40,000) would be allocated for a monument in Mora's honor in the form of either a new turtle observation area or an online tribute with video of nesting sea turtles. Castro also confirmed that the government had plans to turn Moín Beach into a protected park. However, the plan to name the park after Mora was abandoned at the request of his family. MINAE also plans to allocate "specialized units" armed with equipment to protect Costa Rica's coasts from environmental threats.

Tourism to Costa Rica was down sharply during the first half of June 2013. Jorge Molina, president of The Southern Caribbean Tourism Chamber, said Mora's death was affecting reservations and would likely continue to do so for several months. Aurora Gámez, who owns a Manzanillo Beach hotel, said her occupancy rate normally runs at 50% in June, but was at just 10% in the weeks after Mora's death. She said she had received cancellations that specifically cited Mora's death as a factor. Cahuita hotel owner Eddie Ryan echoed Gámez, saying he had two patrons cite Mora's death when cancelling. Restaurants, bars, tour guides, and transportation companies were also affected. Some entrepreneurs blamed WIDECAST for the lost business saying the organization was aware of the risks but continued to patrol anyway.

On June 25, a nationwide protest was held to draw attention to a wide variety of issues. Environmental groups joined the protests, again calling for justice to be served to Mora's murderers.

On July 2, MINAE again met with more than 30 environmental groups to discuss the situation. Castro said that plans to make Moín Beach a protected area were moving forward. However, he said, making the area a national park was not feasible because of the number of people living on the beach. "A national park is too closed off for this particular beach", he explained. Environmentalists requested the formation of a "truth commission" to investigate Mora's murder and eight other deaths from the past 20 years. Government officials said they were in the process of installing radar systems across Costa Rica to detect drug trafficking and illegal fishing, and that they would launch a plan to patrol Moín beach with the assistance of the Costa Rican Petroleum Refinery (RECOPE). MINAE said that ₡30 million (US$60,000) had been allocated for Mora's memorial and environmental education done in his name.

As of July 4, no arrests had been made in relation to the murder of Mora. Ministries of Public Safety Vice Minister Celso Gamboa called the investigation ongoing. In mid-June, Castro had said the investigation was proceeding well and he had "every reason to be optimistic that we will solve this crime." On July 10, the prosecutor's office said two suspects had been identified and that the case would "advance significantly" over the coming week.

On July 31, Costa Rican police raided several locations near Moín and the city of Limón, and arrested several suspects believed to be involved in Mora's murder, as well as other crimes, including robbery and turtle egg poaching. Police said that more arrests are expected.

The first trial of the alleged perpetrators ended in a mistrial and a second trial was held in 2015. In January 2016, a court found seven men accused of Mora's murder not guilty based on reasonable doubt. Four of the men were, however, sentenced to lengthy prison terms due to assault, kidnapping and aggravated robbery for a crime that occurred on the same beach shortly before Mora's murder. (Donald Salmón: 27 years in prison for aggravated robbery, rape and kidnapping; Héctor Cash: 23 years for aggravated robbery, kidnapping and sexual abuse; José Bryan Delgado: 17 years for aggravated robbery and kidnapping; Ernesto Centeno: 17 years for aggravated robbery and kidnapping.) Subsequently, the not guilty verdict was overturned on appeal and the four men were convicted of Mora's murder.

== Legacy ==
On August 17, 2016, the Marine Section of the Society for Conservation Biology (SCB Marine) announced the "Jairo Mora Sandoval Bravery Award." The award is for bravery in activism, scientific education, or public engagement. The award is given biennially and includes a $1,000 financial component. The inaugural award was given posthumously to Mora, with his mother receiving the funds.

Environmentalists requested that the Gandoca-Manzanillo Wildlife Refuge, adjacent to Mora's hometown Gandoca, be renamed in honor of him. The plan was endorsed by his family. The refuge was renamed after him on 2 September 2013 and is now known as Jairo Mora Sandoval Gandoca-Manzanillo Mixed Wildlife Refuge.
