= 2017 in Costa Rica =

- Decades: 1990s; 2000s; 2010s; 2020s
- See also: Other events of 2017; Timeline of Costa Rican history

Events in the year 2017 in Costa Rica.

== Incumbents ==
- President: Luis Guillermo Solís
- First Vice President: Helio Fallas Venegas
- Second Vice President: Ana Helena Chacón Echeverría

== Events ==
- October – Hurricane Nate causes substantial damage.

== Deaths ==
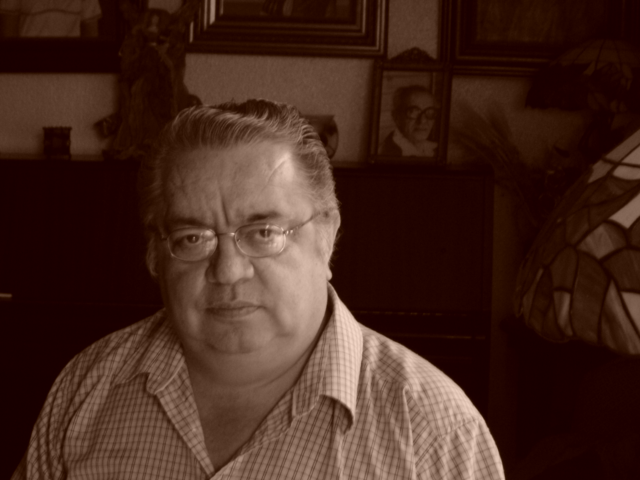
Gonzalo Morales Sáurez

- 11 February – Juan Ulloa, footballer (b. 1935).
- 22 December – Gonzalo Morales Sáurez, painter (b. 1945).
