= Political Database of the Americas =

Non-governmental organization

Political Database of the Americas (PDBA): Base de Datos Políticos de las Américas (Spanish); La Base de Données Politiques des Amériques (French); Banco de Dados Políticos das Américas (Portuguese)
- Headquarters: (United States) Washington, D.C.
- Official languages: English; Spanish; French; Portuguese

Leaders
  - Director: (Brazil) (United States) Valéria Buffo
- Website pdba.georgetown.edu

The Political Database of the Americas (PDBA) is a non-governmental organization based at the Center for Latin American Studies (CLAS), an academic center of the Edmund A. Walsh School of Foreign Service of Georgetown University, Washington, D.C. The objective of the database is to "contribute to the study, promotion and strengthening of democracy in the hemisphere". The PDBA was succeeded by the States and Institutions of Governance in Latin America (SIGLA) database, the beta version of which launched in 2022.

== History ==
The Political Database of the Americas was formed at Georgetown University in 1995 as a result of the 1st Summit of the Americas in 1994 in Miami. It was formed in collaboration with the Organization of American States (OAS) and FLACSO-Chile. This recognized democracy as the only legitimate form of government in the Western Hemisphere, and the OAS and Tinker Foundation funded the creation of the PDBA to promote this mission.

== Objective ==
The objective of the database is to "contribute to the study, promotion and strengthening of democracy in the hemisphere". To achieve this objective, it collects, organises, exchanges and disseminates information, data, statistics on institutions from a political perspective, comparative studies; and other resources relevant to 35 American countries. The database provides comprehensive information about the political systems, institutions and governance of 35 countries in the region.

== States and Institutions of Governance in Latin America (SIGLA) ==
In 2010, new investment in the project ceased and the PDBA was decommissioned, leaving a vacuum for scholars and others interested in Latin American political institutions. The PDBA was succeeded by the States and Institutions of Governance in Latin America (SIGLA) database, the beta version of which launched in 2022. The SIGLA project gathers, archives, and disseminates systematic information on legal and political institutions in Latin America. As this information is freely available to users across the Americas and around the world, SIGLA democratizes access to comparable data about governance in the region. The beta version of the database provides information on Brazil, Colombia, and Mexico.

== See also ==
- Georgetown University
- Edmund A. Walsh School of Foreign Service
- Center for Latin American Studies (Georgetown University)
