= International Institute for Democracy and Electoral Assistance =

Sweden-based intergovernmental organization

- Abbreviation: International IDEA
- Formation: February 28, 1995; 31 years ago
- Type: Intergovernmental organization
- Purpose: Supporting sustainable democracy worldwide
- Headquarters: Strömsborg, SE-103 34
- Location: Stockholm, Sweden
- Region served: Global
- Secretariat: Kevin Casas-Zamora
- Website: idea.int

The International Institute for Democracy and Electoral Assistance (International IDEA) is an intergovernmental organization that works to support and strengthen democratic institutions and processes around the world, to develop sustainable, effective and legitimate democracies. It has regional offices in Europe, Latin America and the Caribbean, Asia and the Pacific, Africa and West Asia, and North America. The organization is headquartered in Stockholm, Sweden.

Kevin Casas Zamora is the secretary-general as of August 2019. Previously, Casas Zamora was Costa Rica's second Vice President and Minister of National Planning. Yves Leterme, former deputy secretary-general at the OECD and former Prime Minister of Belgium, was the previous secretary-general from 2014 to 2019. Leterme replaced Vidar Helgesen.

Gyanesh Kumar, India's Chief Election Commissioner, is the chair of the Council of Member States of International IDEA for 2026. He assumed the chairship at a meeting in Stockholm, Sweden, on 3 December 2025.

International IDEA is an official United Nations Observer.

== History ==
The early 1990s were marked by challenges to democracy worldwide. The violent crackdown in Tiananmen Square in China happened in 1989, and Chile, Brazil, Uruguay and Argentina were all on a slow, difficult road toward democracy after having suffered similarly cruel military coups and dictatorships. Despite a long tradition of autocracy in South Korea, democratic dissident Kim Dae-jung became president. Nelson Mandela's release in 1990 after serving 28 years in prison marked South Africa's first step toward democracy. There were also wide-ranging discussions in other parts of Africa and Asia about how to incorporate democratic norms into their traditions and cultures.

More and more people around the world needed good advice about a number of choices that had to be made in order to make democracy work. In response to this need Sweden, along with 13 other countries took the initiative to found The International Institute for Democracy and Electoral Assistance, International IDEA.

The Founding Conference of International IDEA took place on 27–28 February 1995 and involved 14 founding states: Australia, Barbados, Belgium, Chile, Costa Rica, Denmark, Finland, India, the Netherlands, Norway, Portugal, South Africa, Spain and Sweden. The institute's four initial fields of activity were defined as: (1) the creation of a databank and provision of information services; (2) research; (3) establishing and promotion of guidelines and (4) offering advisory and capacity-building services.

The institute's original structure consisted of a board of 9–15 persons, appointed in their personal capacities rather than as representatives of member states, which developed the work programme. The council (composed of one representative of each member and associate member) was responsible for approving the work programme and budget—despite not being consulted about their development—and for making sure the contributions supported the work program. A founding 'nucleus' board was established that comprised Shridath Ramphal, Adama Dieng and David Steel. Bengt Säve-Söderbergh, who was instrumental in the process of creating International IDEA from the start, was appointed its first secretary-general. Due to practical difficulties and overlapping responsibilities between the board and council, this model later changed.

International IDEA puts efforts towards designing ethical codes, professional rules, and guidelines for electoral processes, and developed three handbooks in the very beginning on Electoral System Design, Democracy and Deep-rooted Conflict, and Women in Parliament.

As part of the institute's 20th anniversary celebration in 2015, Bengt Säve-Söderbergh wrote an essay, "The Birth of an IDEA", that captures how the organization was born and its relevancy. Säve-Söderbergh is the first secretary-general of International IDEA.

In December 2025, Chief Election Commissioner (CEC) Gyanesh Kumar assumed chairship of the council of member states of the International Institute for Democracy and Electoral Assistance (International IDEA) for 2026. He assumed the role during his visit of Stockholm, Sweden on the 3 December 2025.

== Mission ==
International IDEA's mission is to "International IDEA advances, promotes and protects sustainable democracy worldwide in consideration of human rights commitments through policy-relevant knowledge, capacity development, advocacy, and the convening of dialogues". Additionally, International IDEA is dedicated to the following tasks:

- Assist countries build capacity to develop democratic institutions.
- Provide a forum between policy-makers, academics and practitioners.
- Synthesize research and field experience, and develop practical tools to improve democratic processes.
- Promote accountability, transparency and efficiency in election management.
- Facilitate local democracy assessment, monitoring and promotion by local citizens.

== Key activities ==
- Electoral Processes - Support for electoral processes has been at the heart of International IDEA's work since its foundation in 1995. International IDEA's Statutes provide a mandate for the institute's efforts to improve and consolidate democratic electoral processes worldwide. By generating global comparative knowledge, non-prescriptive analysis and policy recommendations aimed at the design, establishment and consolidation of sustainable and credible locally owned electoral processes, the Institute responds to the needs of target audiences. Those include electoral management bodies (EMBs) and electoral practitioners, legislative and judicial bodies, academics, civil society, election observers, as well as development agencies and democracy assistance organizations.
- Constitution-building - Together with local, regional and global partners, the Constitution-building programme raises awareness of the role constitution-building processes play in managing conflict and consolidating democracy. The work involves: Providing technical assistance to national actors engaged in processes of constitution building. Providing knowledge and capacity-building resources that individuals and groups can use to strengthen their participation, and its quality, in processes of constitution building. Facilitating access to lesson learning in comparative contexts so that national, regional and international actors have more options to consider in dealing with different constitutional issues. Servicing a global community of constitution building practitioners through physical and virtual spaces for dialogue.
- Political Participation and Representation - This programme supports political parties focusing on four areas. Party Law and Finance: to improve regulation on party and candidate finance. The Political Party Organization: to allow political parties to develop policy platforms. Political Party Dialogue: to seek consensus within the prevailing political culture of competition, through more effective interparty dialogue. And effective Party Assistance: to strengthen the alignment of approaches in party assistance.
- Democracy Assessment - The Global State of Democracy (GSoD) Initiative was launched in 2016 to analyze current trends and challenges impacting on democracy worldwide. The GSoD Initiative provides evidence-based analysis and data on the global and regional state of democracy. It also seeks to contribute to the public debate on democracy, inform policy interventions and identify problem-solving approaches to trends affecting the quality of democracy. The first report was released in 2017. The Global State of Democracy 2023 Report focused on how "The global state of democracy in 2023 is complex, fluid and unequal". The Global State of Democracy Indices also offers data for anyone to use.

International IDEA offers several online tools and databases including the Voter Turnout Database, Electoral Risk Management tool and the IntegriTAS Threat Assessment System. Anyone can access data on topics such as voter turnout, electoral system design, quotas for women and political finance laws and regulations. Issues of gender, diversity, conflict and security are also addressed. Data from the International IDEA Political Finance Database relating to political disclosure is used as an indicator of public transparency and accountability in the Basel AML Index, a money laundering and terrorist financing risk assessment tool developed by the Basel Institute on Governance.

International IDEA has been granted UN observer status.

== Members ==
International IDEA's founding Member States were Australia, Barbados, Belgium, Chile, Costa Rica, Denmark, Finland, India, Netherlands, Norway, Portugal, South Africa, Spain, and Sweden.

As of 2024 the 35 Member States include: Australia, Barbados, Belgium, Benin, Botswana, Brazil, Canada, Cape Verde, Chile, Costa Rica, Dominican Republic, Estonia, Finland, France, Germany, Ghana, India, Indonesia, Luxembourg, Mauritius, Mexico, Mongolia, Namibia, Netherlands, Norway, Panama, Peru, Philippines, Portugal, South Africa, Spain, Sweden, Switzerland, Tunisia and Uruguay. Japan has official observer status. The United States had observer status but left the organization in January 2026.

In the past, Member States took turns hosting a Democracy Forum that encouraged dialogue across Member States and with civil society actors, academia and youth. Past Democracy Forum topics have included anti-corruption, accountability, natural resource management and youth participation.

== Internal structure ==
International IDEA's nearly 300 staff members are located in various offices worldwide. The headquarters is in Stockholm, Sweden, with additional offices in New York, USA; Washington, DC, USA, Brussels, Belgium; The Hague, Netherlands; Kathmandu, Nepal; Abuja, Nigeria; Suva, Fiji; Thimphu, Bhutan; Santiago, Chad; The Gambia; Kenya; Sierra Leone, Chile; Lima, Panama City, Panama; Peru; Asunción; Addis Ababa, Ethiopia; Tunis, Tunisia; Canberra, Australia.

The organization is also a permanent representative to the United Nations, based in New York City.

== See also ==
- Community of Democracies
- Community of Democratic Choice
