= 2018 in Costa Rica =

- Decades: 1990s; 2000s; 2010s; 2020s
- See also: Other events of 2018; Timeline of Costa Rican history

Costa Rica saw significant political, social, economic and sporting events in 2018.1 The year began with national elections, continued with policy protests and landmark court rulings, and featured Costa Rica’s participation in the 2018 FIFA World Cup in Russia.2

Political events

- Presidential election: Costa Rica held a general election in early 2018 . In the first round on Feb 4, no candidate won a majority. The April 1 runoff pitted evangelical singer Fabricio Alvarado (National Restoration Party) against writer/former minister Carlos Alvarado Quesada (Citizens’ Action Party). Carlos Alvarado won decisively with 60.6% of the vote .
- Change of government: Carlos Alvarado (PAC) was sworn in as president on May 8, 2018, succeeding outgoing President Luis Guillermo Solís . Alvarado’s inauguration speech highlighted social inclusion and environmental goals. Legislative elections gave no clear majority: the National Liberation Party (PLN) won 17 seats, National Restoration 14, PAC 10, and other parties the remainder .
- LGBTQ rights: On August 8, 2018, Costa Rica’s Constitutional Chamber (Sala IV) ruled that the ban on same-sex marriage was unconstitutional . The court gave the legislature 18 months to change the law; failing that, same-sex marriage would automatically become legal. This landmark decision (published Nov 26, 2018) made Costa Rica the first Central American country moving toward marriage equality .
- Other governance issues: 2018 saw no major cabinet reshuffles beyond the new administration’s appointments. However, the elections were notable for unprecedented fragmentation (25 presidential candidates ran, more than ever) and for campaign debates over social issues like abortion and education.

Economy and fiscal issues

- Fiscal reform and protests: President Alvarado’s administration pushed major tax reforms to address the large budget deficit. A key proposal was to replace the 13% sales tax with a broader-value-added tax (VAT) . From mid-September 2018 onward, this provoked mass protests and strikes by public-sector unions and students . Thousands of people marched, held sit-ins and road-blocks, and in October protesters even confronted the president during a public appearance . The strikes (some of the largest in a decade) aimed to pressure Congress to block the reforms .
- Economic impact: These protests disrupted commerce and tourism, slowing growth. FocusEconomics reports that Costa Rica’s economy grew only about 1.4% in Q4 2018 (down from ~2.5% in Q3) – “the weakest growth since Q1 2013” – in part because “large public protests related to fiscal policy reform” hit activity . Private consumption and investment both weakened late in the year . In December 2018 Congress ultimately approved the tax overhaul (the VAT law and related measures), to take effect in mid-2019.
- Tourism and other sectors: Tourism – a major foreign-exchange earner – remained robust. Costa Rica welcomed about 3.02 million international visitors in 2018, roughly 57,000 more than in 2017 . Infrastructure projects (e.g. the new Limón port) and planned fiscal reforms were expected to improve the investment climate going forward . (Costa Rica continued negotiating international credit lines to bolster finances.)
- Labor and social spending: In response to protests, the Alvarado government froze some public sector raises and rolled back allowances. Unions remained strong. In addition, cost-of-living inflation stayed moderate (around 2–3%), but public debt continued rising, keeping fiscal sustainability on the agenda.

Society and social issues

- Migration: Political violence in neighboring Nicaragua triggered a refugee surge. By mid-2018 an average of about 200 Nicaraguans per day were applying for asylum in Costa Rica . The UNHCR reported roughly 8,000 Nicaraguan asylum applications by August 2018 . This influx strained Costa Rica’s immigration system and prompted debates on reception and integration. (Costa Rica remained officially welcoming, but authorities also tightened checks on asylum applicants with criminal records .)
- Public demonstrations: Beyond the fiscal protests, Costa Rica saw other civic activism. For example, labor and student groups staged smaller strikes over education funding and wage issues. The same-sex marriage ruling itself spurred public debate: conservative groups protested it, while LGBT and human-rights groups celebrated. Environmental activism continued, focused on issues like mining impacts and forestry.
- Cultural highlights: Costa Rica hosted international events like the XVIII International Festival of Baroque Music (Oct–Nov) and film festivals, reflecting its growing cultural scene. There were also memorial events (e.g. commemoration of past student protests). Notably, Costa Rica continued to gain global attention for “pura vida” (laid-back) lifestyle and environmental image.

Environment and international initiatives

- Renewable energy: Costa Rica reinforced its green reputation in 2018. The national grid ran on over 98% renewable electricity, often going many months at a time with no fossil fuels . In fact, for 300 of 365 days in 2018, Costa Rica produced all its power from renewables (primarily hydro, wind and geothermal). By comparison, many countries are far below that level of green energy.
- Decarbonization goals: At his May 8 inauguration, President Alvarado announced that by 2021 Costa Rica would begin phasing out fossil fuels in transportation . He even arrived at the ceremony on a hydrogen-electric bus. Experts noted that while electricity is already green, transportation (buses, cars) still depends on oil, so the new plan aimed for 100% decarbonization of roads.
- Global leadership: Internationally, Costa Rica maintained a strong voice on climate and human rights. In September 2018, Vice President Epsy Campbell Barr (Costa Rica) launched the “For All Initiative” at the UN General Assembly. This project seeks to make gender equality and human rights core components of global environmental treaties . Costa Rica has long championed linking human rights with climate policy (it launched a similar “Geneva Pledge” in 2015). The 2018 “For All Initiative” was widely covered in the press as a positive step highlighting women’s role in sustainability .

Sports

- 2018 FIFA World Cup: Costa Rica qualified for the 2018 World Cup in Russia (its 6th appearance) by topping its CONCACAF qualifying group. In Russia it was placed in Group E with Brazil, Switzerland and Serbia. Costa Rica lost 0–1 to Serbia and 0–2 to Brazil, and then drew 2–2 with Switzerland . With 1 point from three games, Costa Rica finished bottom of the group and was eliminated in the group stage . (This was a disappointment after their surprise 2014 quarter-final run.) Following the early exit, Costa Rica’s coach Óscar Ramírez was not retained .
- Domestic leagues: In Costa Rica’s own top league (Liga FPD), LD Alajuelense won the 2017–18 Apertura championship, and Deportivo Saprissa won the Clausura in 2018, reflecting the continued rivalry of the two giants.
- Other sports: Costa Rican athletes competed in regional games (e.g. the 2018 Central American and Caribbean Games), with modest medal hauls in swimming, gymnastics and weightlifting. Tennis star Marcelo Arévalo won a doubles title on the ATP tour, and road cyclist Andrey Amador raced in Europe’s Grand Tours. These were secondary to the World Cup in public attention, but notable for fans.

== Incumbents ==
- President: Luis Guillermo Solís (until 8 May), Carlos Alvarado Quesada (starting 8 May)
- First Vice President: Helio Fallas Venegas (until 8 May), Epsy Campbell Barr (starting 8 May)
- Second Vice President: Ana Helena Chacón Echeverría (until 8 May), Marvin Rodríguez Cordero (starting 8 May)

== Events ==
- 8 May - Carlos Alvarado sworn in as 48th president.
