= Kevin Casas Zamora =

Costa Rican politician (born 1968)

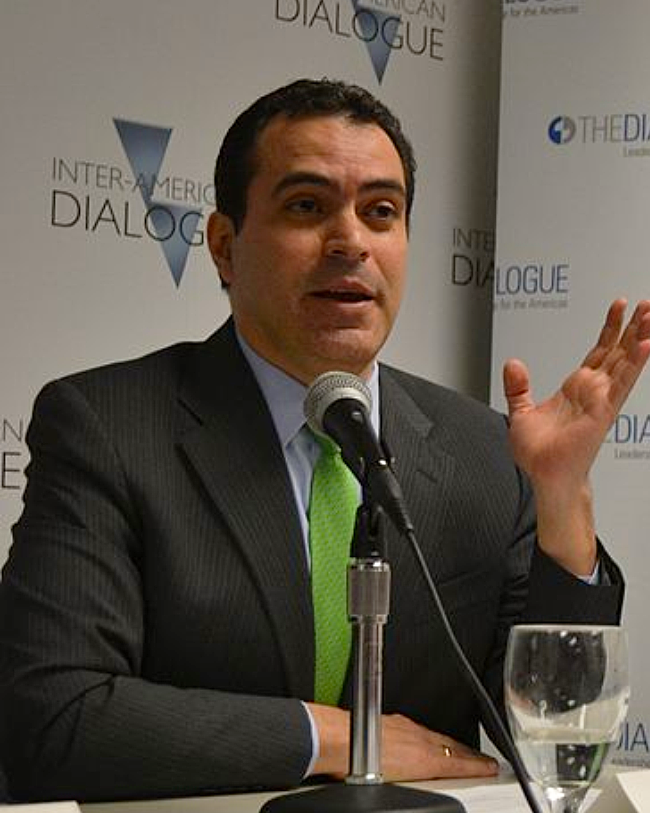
- Casas in 2016

Secretary General of the International Institute for Democracy and Electoral Assistance
- Incumbent
- Assumed office 1 August 2019
- Preceded by: Yves Leterme

OAS Secretary for Political Affairs
- In office 2012–2015
- Secretary-General: José Miguel Insulza; Luis Almagro
- Preceded by: Víctor Rico Frontaura
- Succeeded by: Francisco Guerrero Aguirre

Second Vice President of Costa Rica
- In office 8 May 2006 – 22 September 2007
- President: Óscar Arias
- Preceded by: Luis Fishman Zonzinski
- Succeeded by: Luis Liberman

Minister of National Planning and Economic Policy
- In office 8 May 2006 – 22 September 2007
- President: Óscar Arias
- Preceded by: Jorge Polinaris Vargas
- Succeeded by: Roberto Gallardo Núñez

Personal details
- Born: Kevin Roberto Casas Zamora; 4 August 1968 (age 58) San Jose, Costa Rica
- Party: PLN
- Spouse: Simone Bunse (m. 2003)
- Children: 2
- Education: University of Costa Rica (LLB); University of Essex (MA); Oxford University (PhD)
- Occupation: Lawyer; politician; political scientist; professor

Kevin Roberto Casas Zamora (born 4 August 1968) is a Costa Rican political scientist, lawyer and politician who has served as Secretary-General of the International Institute for Democracy and Electoral Assistance since 2019. A member of the National Liberation Party, he served as Second Vice President of Costa Rica and Minister of National Planning and Economic Policy from 2006 to 2007.

Casas-Zamora has held several prominent positions in the fields of democracy promotion and international affairs, including Secretary for Political Affairs of the Organization of American States from 2012 to 2015, Senior Fellow at the Brookings Institution, and Director of the Peter D. Bell Rule of Law Program at the Inter-American Dialogue. An academic specialist in democratic governance and political finance, he has written extensively on elections, political parties, and democracy in Latin America.

Casas-Zamora earned a Bachelor of Laws degree from the University of Costa Rica, where he later served as an associate professor between 1996 and 2006. He subsequently obtained a Master of Arts from the University of Essex and a Doctor of Philosophy (PhD) in politics from the University of Oxford. His doctoral dissertation, titled "Paying for Democracy in Latin America: Political Finance and State Funding for Parties in Costa Rica and Uruguay", received the 2004 Jean Blondel PhD Prize from the European Consortium for Political Research, awarded annually to the best doctoral thesis in political science in Europe. The dissertation was later expanded into the book "Paying for Democracy".

In 2007, the World Economic Forum named Casas-Zamora a Young Global Leader in recognition of his professional achievements and leadership potential.

== The 16 Days of the "Memorandum" ==
In 2007, the Supreme Electoral Tribunal called the first referendum to decide by popular vote whether or not to approve the Dominican Republic–Central America Free Trade Agreement (TLC in Spanish, or CAFTA).

The arguments for and against gave rise to two camps, known as the "Yes" and the "No." The government supported approval of the treaty, and throughout this period a wide range of positions emerged, gaining strength as the weeks passed. Against this backdrop, the Semanario Universidad published a private document called the "Memorandum", written by Kevin Casas Zamora and Deputy Fernando Sánchez Campos (National Liberation Party – Heredia), addressed to President Arias Sánchez and to the Minister of the Presidency, Rodrigo Arias Sánchez, containing a series of comments and recommendations about the campaign. These included running a smear campaign against opponents of the treaty by accusing them of having ties to governments unpopular in Costa Rica, of being against democracy and freedom, and of being violent or radical groups. It also recommended warning the country's mayors that if the "No" won in their cantons they would receive no state funding. The document had been unlawfully taken from the President of the Republic's email account and handed to the press.

The document's contents provoked a strong public reaction and were condemned by a range of political and academic figures, both supporters and opponents of the treaty. The main accusation was that it violated Costa Rican values of democracy and electoral integrity and called for sowing fear among the public through deceptive and alarmist strategies. The document was nicknamed the "Memorandum of Fear". The pressure this generated culminated in Casas's resignation 16 days later, on 22 September 2007.

Shortly afterward, on 28 September 2007, a report by the Internal Audit Office of the Ministry of National Planning and Economic Policy (MIDEPLAN) cleared Casas of all responsibility for any alleged misuse of public funds in drafting or carrying out the contents of the memorandum during the CAFTA campaign.

A few months later, on 30 May 2008, the Supreme Electoral Tribunal of Costa Rica likewise cleared Casas of all responsibility for alleged electoral offenses arising from the memorandum. The Tribunal held that the document had been written in the full exercise of its authors' freedom of expression, that it was a private document not intended for mass circulation, and that there was no evidence its drafting had caused harm to third parties. These conclusions were upheld by a ruling of the Criminal Court of the Second Judicial Circuit of San José on 6 March 2009, in connection with a complaint filed against Casas Zamora by Deputy Óscar López Arias (Accessibility Without Exclusion Party – San José) for the offenses of coercion and influence peddling. The court found no grounds whatsoever to prosecute the accused, noting that the document was a private one that had been unlawfully taken and that there was no evidence any action had been carried out to implement its contents.

On 10 August 2009, the Ethics and Discipline Tribunal of the National Liberation Party absolved Casas of any fault or responsibility for what had happened, finding that the document underlying the complaint had been obtained by illegitimate means.
