= Jairo Mora Sandoval Gandoca-Manzanillo Mixed Wildlife Refuge =

Protected area in Costa Rica

- Refugio de Vida Silvestre Mixto Jairo Mora Sandoval Gandoca-Manzanillo
- IUCN category IV (habitat/species management area)
- Jairo Mora Sandoval Gandoca-Manzanillo Mixed Wildlife Refuge area.
- Location: Talamanca, Limón, Costa Rica
- Nearest city: Bribri, Talamanca
- Coordinates: 9.604°N 82.642°W
- Area: 45.66 square kilometres (17.63 sq mi) (terrestrial), 59.23 square kilometres (22.87 sq mi) (marine)
- Established: 29 October 1986
- Governing body: National System of Conservation Areas (SINAC)
- Location in Costa Rica

Ramsar Wetland
- Official name: Gandoca–Manzanillo
- Designated: 11 December 1995
- Reference no.: 783

Jairo Mora Sandoval Gandoca-Manzanillo Mixed Wildlife Refuge (Spanish: Refugio Nacional de Vida Silvestre Mixto Jairo Mora Sandoval Gandoca-Manzanillo) is a protected area in Costa Rica, managed under the Caribbean La Amistad Conservation Area. It was created in 1986 by decree. It protects both a land portion and a marine portion. The refuge was renamed to honour the murdered environmentalist Jairo Mora Sandoval in 2013. Land along the coast containing a number of small towns was removed from the refuge in 2014 due to complaints from the local residents about evictions and destruction of property due to strict building codes. It is one of only two places in Costa Rica where manatees still occur. It is located in a coastal beach region, fronted by coral reefs and clothed in tropical forest, with 1950-3000mm yearly precipitation.

The Gandoca-Manzanillo Ramsar site is located in this refuge.

== Location ==
Located in the Talamanca canton, the Jairo Mora Sandoval Gandoca-Manzanillo Mixed Wildlife Refuge is found at the southernmost Atlantic coast of Costa Rica, next to the border with Panama. It has two entrances, the first and main access is at the village of Manzanillo which provides services to this area and is the terminus of Route 256, which has a junction with Route 36, which starts in Limón district.

Route 256 runs along the coastline, and the end of it is almost completely encircled by the refuge -the marine part of the refuge includes the sea, and further inland west of the road is the land part of the refuge. It ends at the small town of Manzanillo, which likewise forms a salient almost completely encircled by the refuge. This area includes hotels, rental homes, mini boutique resorts, restaurants, bakeries, and beach bars, as well as a few public beaches at the villages of Punta Cocles, Playa Chiquita, and Punta Uva. These villages were formerly part of the park, but were removed from the refuge to allow for local development.

The second access is near the small town of Gandoca, which can be accessed from Route 36 near the border crossing with Panama over the Sixaola River.

There are at least three small villages or populated areas within the refuge: Punta Mona and Mile Creek along the coast, and Finca Buena Fe along the Sixaola River. The Gandoca-Manzanillo Ramsar site is located in this refuge. There is a macaw rehabilitation centre and a Jaguar Rescue Center abutting the refuge near Route 256. Further inland to the west from the town of Gandoca lies a Bribri reservation, Kéköldi.

The larger area around the refuge is largely devoted to banana and plantain cultivation, both conventional plantations and mixed subsistence plots.

== History ==
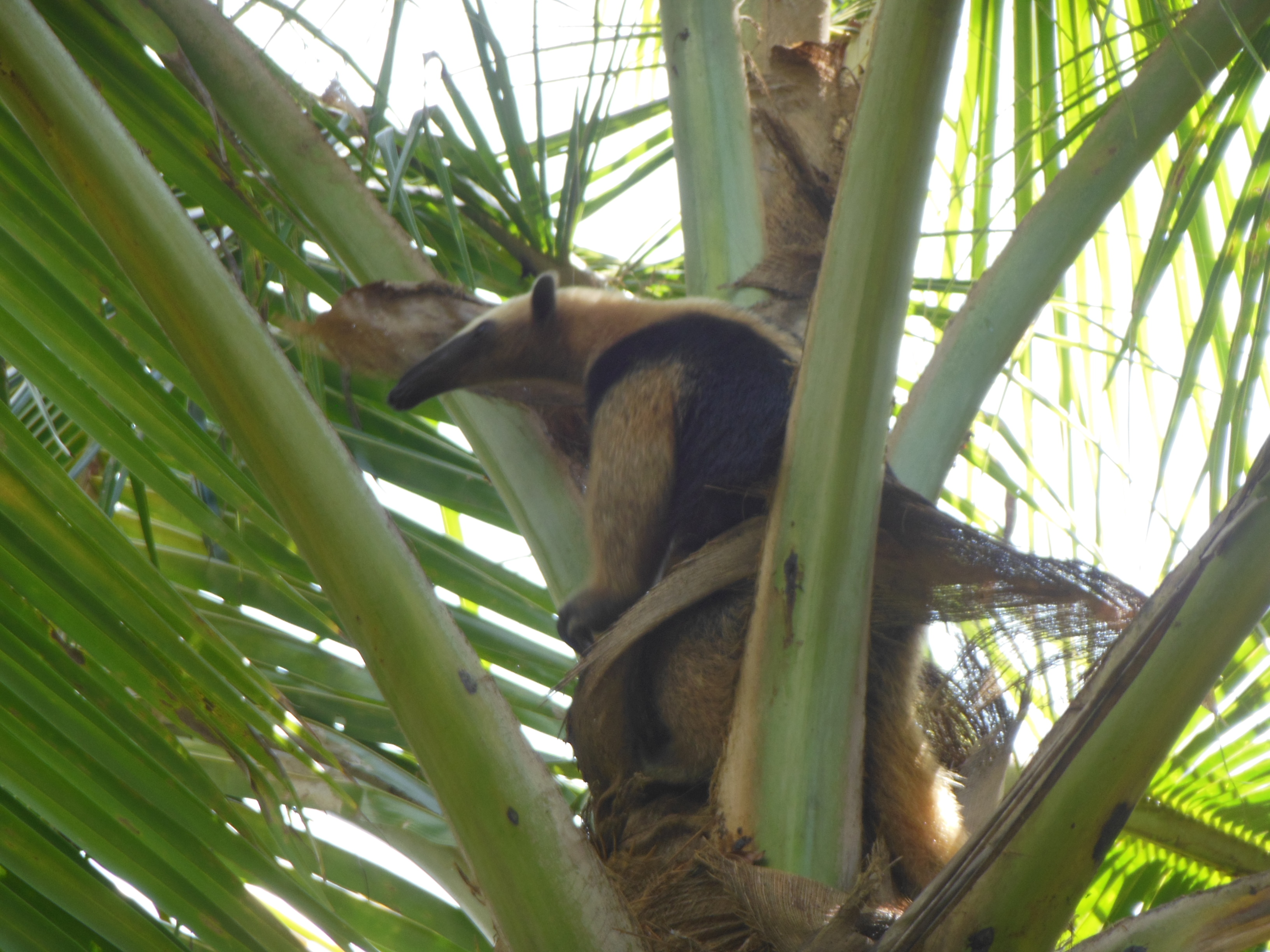
northern tamandua anteater (Tamandua mexicana) in the Gandoca-Manzanillo Wildlife Refuge

The territory was originally inhabited by the Bribri people.

During the 1700s, Afro-descendant fishermen from the English colonies seasonally migrated up and down the Caribbean coast to hunt for sea turtles. In 1828 one of these fishermen brought his family up to Cahuita Point (now Cahuita National Park) and in the following years the coast was subsequently settled by other families. Some historians allege that when in the early 20th century the US United Fruit Company moved into the country to begin banana plantations in the area, they murdered Bribri leaders and violently forced them off their land, causing them to flee away from the lowlands into the mountains. Other historians say Bribri and Cabécar moved to the area in the 1920s, working as day-labourers on cocoa farms along the coast, eventually settling and establishing their own farms. As measles and other diseases struck the Cordillera de Talamanca in the 1930s, more people moved to the coastal region.

The refuge was created in 1986 by national decree 16614-MAG. When it was created, the reserve originally included numerous small fishing villages along the coast inhabited by a population of the English-speaking Afro-Caribbean minority. The region never saw the historical development as elsewhere in Costa Rica, and flimsy bridges along dirt roads kept the capital city far away during much of the 20th century, which helped preserve the culture and nature.

The 1992 novel The Madwoman of Gandoca (Spanish: La Loca de Gandoca), by Anacristina Rossi depicts the fights and efforts to create the refuge from an autobiographical point of view, as there were opposite private and government efforts to develop the area as a travel resort, the book was required reading at high school (secondary level) in Costa Rica.

On 2 September 2013 the refuge was renamed from the 'Gandoca-Manzanillo National Wildlife Refuge' to the present name, to honour the murdered environmentalist Jairo Mora Sandoval. The formal posthumous homage ceremony was held in the refuge on 26 April 2014.

Having their lands declared a nature reserve subjected the community which found itself inhabiting the refuge to strict and onerous building codes as well as Costa Rica's Maritime Law, and numerous houses or local businesses were notified of impending evictions and subsequent demolitions of their properties in the early 2010s, leading to resentment towards the refuge and complaints of greenwashing racism. In 2014 the Costa Rican legislature adopted Law 9223, Recognition of the Rights of Inhabitants of the South Caribbean, by which 900 acres of land along the coast were removed from the refuge in order to rectify this situation.

== Importance ==
In the early 1990s, the refuge was said to be economically important to local inhabitants for its fishing grounds, as fishing was a main source of revenue.

=== Flora and habitats ===
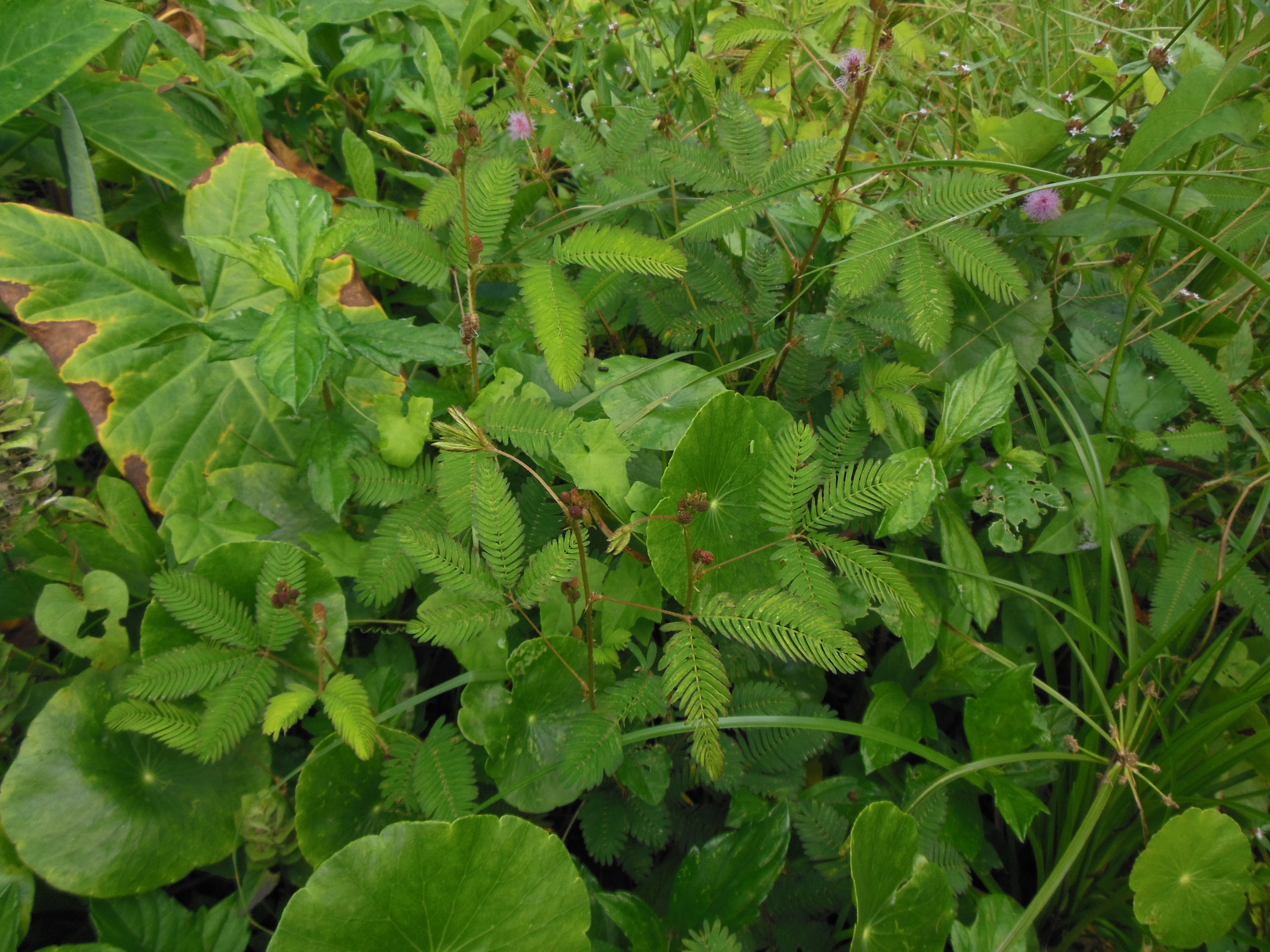
sensitive plant (Mimosa pudica) in the Gandoca-Manzanillo Wildlife Refuge

The refuge protects mangroves, estuaries, seagrass, inundated forests, coral reefs, and sea turtle nesting. The palm Raphia taedigera, locally known as yolillo, and the trees Campnosperma panamensis (orey) and Prioria copaifera (cativo) are particularly common.

There are some mangroves are present, primarily in a wide channel in the mouth of the Río Gandoca near the village of Gandoca, where there are some 250ha. dominated by Rhizophora mangle. There are a number of other small patches up and down the coast, many in the process of enlargement.

The beaches along this coast of Costa Rica are completely covered in seawater up to the treeline twice a day at high tide. Much of the coastline suffers from coastal erosion, knocking over trees as the soil below their roots is eaten away. Common trees here are coconut and sea grape. Morinda citrifolia and Terminalia catappa, known locally as almendro de playa, are introduced species from Asia which have also become common, many of these almendros have grown into large-sized individuals.

Yolillo is found in extensive palm brakes known locally as yolillales, where it is the dominant plant. This type of habitat forms on flat lowlands which are inundated by floodwaters for much of the year. Another palm species associated with these yolillo palms is the smaller Astrocaryum alatum (coquito). Other species occurring in these swamps are orey, cativo, Pterocarpus officinalis (sangrillo), and Carapa nicaraguensis (caobilla).

A special forest ecosystem of some 400ha. occurs between Punta Mona and Middle Creek called cativales or cativera, which is named after the dominant tree here, cativo. This occurs in a flat, lowland area where the water level and the frequency of flooding are the greatest. The forest is somewhat open and the trees are short, allowing for a diverse composition of plant species, and enough light to reach the forest floor to allow an understory to develop consisting primarily of dwarf palms.

An open herbaceous grassland swamp also occurs here, spreading over an area of 600ha. Besides grasses and floating vegetation, other common species are the trees Mimosa pigra (uña de gato) and Dalbergia brownei (varilla negra).

=== Fauna ===
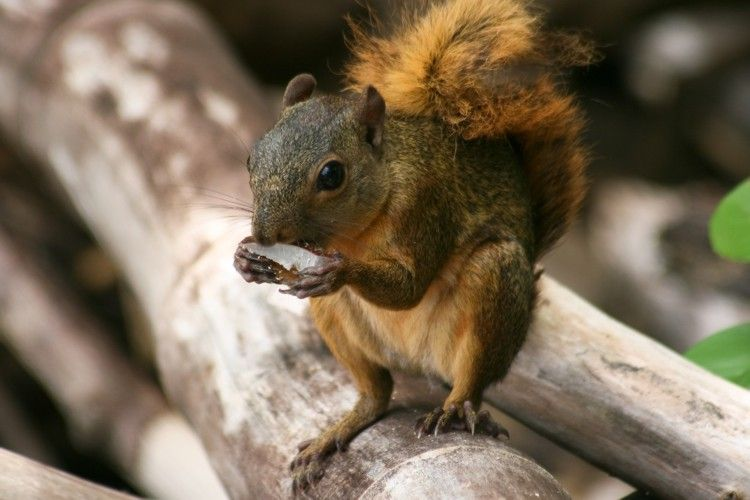
a red-tailed squirrel, Sciurus granatensis, in the refuge

Several animals inhabit the refuge, among them:

- Blue morpho butterfly
- Caribbean spiny lobster
- Atlantic tarpon (sábalo)
- Eyelash viper (toboba de pestaña, bocaracá, oropel)
- Crocodile
- Caiman
- Harpy eagle
- Red-lored parrot
- Chestnut-mandibled toucan
- Keel-billed toucan
- Tufted harrier
- Tapir
- Geoffroy's spider monkey
- Mantled howler
- Panamanian white-faced capuchin
- Hoffmann's two-toed sloth
- Brown-throated sloth
- Northern tamandua

The refuge includes Crassostrea rhizophorae, the 'mangrove cupped oyster', these are the only known natural banks found in a coastline reef area.

Three species of dolphin are known in the area. The Caribbean Sea hosts the common bottlenose dolphin and the Atlantic spotted dolphin. The freshwater Guiana dolphin, locally known as tucuxi, was only recently discovered to occur here. Gandoca-Manzanillo is one of only two places in the country where manatees still occur. In former times they were hunted, using a special technique, for their meat.

The leatherback turtle, green turtle, and hawksbill turtle all lay eggs at beaches within the refuge.

An attempt has been made to reintroduce captive-bred great green macaws to the refuge, with 60 birds released as of 2019. These macaws live in artificial nesting barrels hung from trees.

== Tourism ==
Access to the refuge is free. It is open from 8:00 a.m. to 4:00 p.m. There are latrines, drinking water, a picnic area, parking areas, local guides, and visitor assistance available. There are restaurants, and hotels and cabins for accommodation, located outside the refuge. There are paved and gravel access roads.

Swimming with dolphins was a popular activity among tourists here, but Costa Rican law banned the practice in 2006 for the sake of the animals' health.

Lionfish, Pterois miles and P. volitans, are an invasive species of fish in the seas off the eastern coast of the country since 2009. The introduction to the environment appears to have displaced the native population of spiny lobsters, previously one of the most important commercial catch species in the area. Despite having poisonous spines, it is quite tasty. The local Southern Caribbean Artisanal Fishermen Association has organised an annual snorkelling and harpooning competition since 2012. It is also caught in (modified, or not) lobster pots. The fish have begun to become popular dishes in local restaurants.

== Management ==
The refuge is managed by the National System of Conservation Areas (SINAC), a government agency, and is geographically categorised as within the greater Caribbean La Amistad Conservation Area.
