= 2016 in Costa Rica =

- Decades: 1990s; 2000s; 2010s; 2020s
- See also: Other events of 2016; Timeline of Costa Rican history

== Incumbents ==
- President: Luis Guillermo Solís
- First Vice President: Helio Fallas Venegas
- Second Vice President: Ana Helena Chacón Echeverría

== Events ==
- August 5–21 – 11 athletes from Costa Rica competed in the 2016 Summer Olympics in Rio de Janeiro, Brazil
