= Organization of American States Secretariat for Political Affairs =

Secretariat for Political Affairs
- Formation: 2006
- Headquarters: Washington, D.C., U.S.
- Region served: The Americas
- Secretary for Political Affairs: Kevin Casas-Zamora
- Parent organization: Organization of American States General Secretariat
- Website: Official Homepage of the Secretariat for Political Affairs

The Secretariat for Political Affairs of the Organization of American States is a part of the OAS' General Secretariat. The Secretariat for Political Affairs has a mandate to strengthen the political processes of the Organization of American States member states and to increase the legitimacy of those political institutions.

== Structure ==
The Secretariat for Political Affairs consists of the Executive Office of the Secretary for Political Affairs, an administrative support section, and three departments.

=== Department of Electoral Cooperation and Observation ===
The Department of Electoral Cooperation and Observation (DECO) provides technical assistance for electoral activities for member states. The Department of Electoral Cooperation also maintains an Electoral Observation Missions Sections to provide the Organization of American States with election monitoring capabilities.

=== Department of Sustainable Democracy and Special Missions ===
The Department of Sustainable Democracy and Special Missions (DSDSM) provides support to the General Secretariat in handling political and institutional conflicts in the region.

The department carries out efforts in three interrelated areas to prevent, manage, and resolve conflicts. It implements a methodology for political analysis; provides advice and technical support to missions established by the Permanent Council or the OAS Secretary General; and finally, coordinates activities geared toward the peaceful settlement of territorial disputes and the promotion of a culture of peace.

=== Department for Effective Public Management ===
The Department for Effective Public Management (DEPM) provides support to OAS Member States in matters of public management through strengthening democratic institutions. This includes technical assistance projects in organizational design and results based management; information and communication technology (ICT) application to public sector operation; training programs and mechanisms for dialogue and experiences exchange that promote horizontal cooperation.
