= Gonzalo Morales Sáurez =

Gonzalo Morales
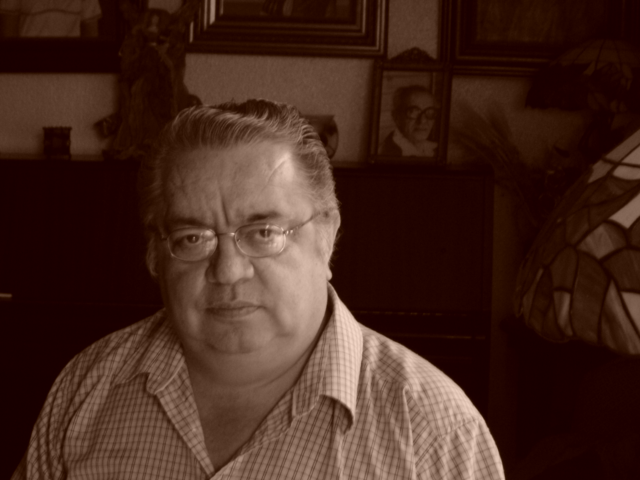
- Morales in 2005
- Born: Gonzalo Morales Sáurez; July 9, 1945; San José, Costa Rica
- Died: December 22, 2017 (aged 72); San José, Costa Rica
- Education: Royal Academy of Arts, Madrid Spain
- Known for: Painting, Drawing, Sculpture
- Notable work: Jacket de cuero (1975); Retrato de rosa (1996)
- Movement: Photorealism
- Spouse: Nieves Mateo
- Website: gonzalomorales.net

Gonzalo Morales Sáurez (9 July 1945 – 22 December 2017) was a Costa Rican painter. He studied in The San Fernando Academy in Madrid, Spain from 1970 to 1974. He is best known for his hyper-realistic works, and has exhibited his art in many museums and art galleries in Europe and the Americas.

== Biography ==
Gonzalo Morales Sáurez was born in San José, Costa Rica, in 1945. He started his studies with his father, painter Gonzalo Morales Alvarado. Later, he travelled to Spain to continue his studies at the Royal Academy of Arts, in Madrid, Spain, and also at the School of Murals in San Cougat, Barcelona.

His paintings can be seen in different countries such as Spain, France, US, Mexico, Guatemala, Honduras, El Salvador, Nicaragua, Panama, Colombia and Venezuela.

In Costa Rica, examples of his work are in several public institutions and museums such as the Costa Rican Parliament (Asamblea Legislativa), the National Museum (Museo Nacional), the Costa Rican Museum of Art, the Central Bank (Banco Central de Costa Rica), among others.

Gonzalo Morales died on December 22, 2017, due to a heart attack at his home in San José, Costa Rica.

== Gallery ==
Girl in front of Mirror

== Individual exhibitions ==
- 1990 – “Obras en Pastel, Galería Valanti, San José, Costa Rica.
- 1988 – Exposición Retrospectiva, Asamblea Legislativa, San José, Costa Rica.
- 1986–87 – “Obras en Pastel”, Galería Contemporánea, San José, Costa Rica.
- 1981 – Galería de Arte, Club Internacional, San José, Costa Rica.
- 1979 – Galería Forma y Color, San José, Costa Rica.
- 1978 – Galería Enrique Echando, Ministerio de Cultura Juventud y Deportes, San José, Costa Rica.
- 1974 – Espacio Jorge de Bravo, San José, Costa Rica.

== Collective exhibitions ==
- 2009- "Contrastes", Instituto Cultural de Mexico, San José, Costa Rica.
- 2007- Exposición Pueblarte, Galeria Pueblarte, Cartago, Costa Rica.
- 2001- Exposición “Grupo Sama”, Hotel Camino Real, San José, Costa Rica.
- 2000- Colectiva, Club Unión, San José, Costa Rica.
- 1999- Colectiva, Instituto Nacional de Seguros, San José, Costa Rica.
- 1998- Bienal de Bodegón, Museo de Los Niños, San José, Costa Rica.
- 1997- Premios Nacionales, Instituto Nacional de Seguros, San José, Costa Rica.
- 1996- Exposición “Grupo Sama” Club Unión, San José, Costa Rica.
- 1995- “Premios Nacionales Aquiles J Echeverría 1962-1994), Museos del Banco Central de Costa Rica, San José, Costa Rica.
- 1994- Galería Siglo XXI, San Salvador, El Salvador
- 1992- Instituto Nacional de Seguros, San José, Costa Rica. Inauguración Galería de la Asociación de Pintores y Escultores Costarricenses, San José, Costa Rica.
- 1989- VI Bienal Iberoamericana de Arte Instituto Pedro Domeq, Palacio de Bellas Artes, México, DF.
- 1984-87- Exposición “La Nueva Pintura Costarricense”, Museo Nacional, San Jose, Costa Rica.
- 1983- III Bienal Iberoamericana de Arte, México, Museo Carrillo Gil. Galería Los Independientes, San José, Costa Rica.
- 1982- Exposición “La Nueva Pintura Costarricense”, Museo Nacional, San José, Costa Rica. Museo de Arte de la OEA, Washington, EE.UU.
- 1978- Exposición de Arte Centro Americana, Casa de las Américas, La Habana, Cuba. Exposición Iberoamericana, Galería Forma, San Salvador, El Salvador. Salón Anual de Artes Plásticas, Museo Nacional, San José, Costa Rica.
- 1977- Exposición Iberoamericana, Sala Plaza España, Madrid, España. Galería Arte Actual, San José, Costa Rica. Salón Internacional Xerox, Managua, Nicaragua.
- 1976- V Salón Anual de Artes Plásticas, Museo Nacional, San José, Costa Rica.
- 1975- Galería Antonio Machado, Madrid, España. Galería Circulo Dos, Madrid, España.
