= Georgetown University Center for Latin American Studies =

Center for Latin American Studies
- Type: Academic institute
- Established: 1959
- Parent institution: Georgetown University
- Director: Diana Kapiszewski
- Location: Washington, D.C.
- Website: clas.georgetown.edu

The Center for Latin American Studies (sometimes abbreviated to CLAS) is an academic institute within the School of Foreign Service of Georgetown University in Washington, DC dedicated to education about and research of Latin America. The center was founded in 1959 by Dr. William Manger, the former Assistant Secretary General of the Organization of American States, as the Georgetown University Latin American Studies Program. Due to its inter-disciplinary orientation, it was one of the first programs of its kind in the United States.

In 1990, the program was placed under the School of Foreign Service and given its current name. Dr. Arturo Valenzuela, as director, oversaw the transition of the Latin American Studies Program into the Center for Latin American Studies. The current director is Dr. Marc Chernick. A major project of CLAS is the Political Database of the Americas, which centralizes information about the constitutions, governments, and political processes of countries within Latin America.

== Academic programs ==
The Center for Latin American Studies offers a master of arts degree in Latin American studies in addition to graduate and undergraduate certificates. It also offers joint degrees with the Georgetown Law Center and Graduate School of Arts & Sciences Department of Government as well as other universities. An accelerated BA/MA or BS/MA is also available.

The center offers summer study abroad and travel programs in Brazil, Chile, Colombia, Ecuador, and Argentina. It also sponsors grants for internships, travel research, and humanitarian programs throughout Latin America.

== See also ==
- School of Foreign Service
- Georgetown University Graduate School of Arts and Sciences
- Political Database of the Americas
