= René Castro =

Costa Rican-American environmental economist and politician

René Castro Salazar
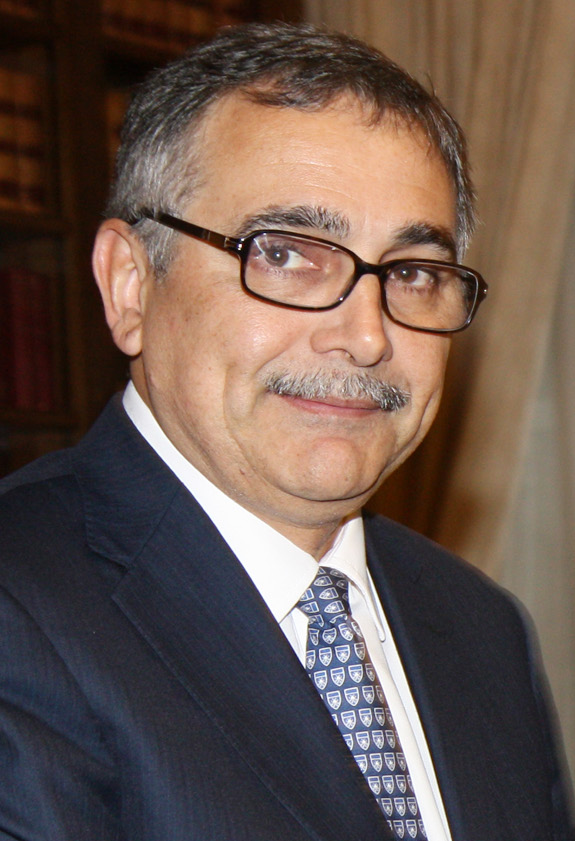
- Salazar in 2011

Assistant Director-General of the Food and Agriculture Organization
- In office 10 February 2016 – August 2022
- Director-General: José Graziano da Silva; Qu Dongyu

Minister of Environment and Energy
- In office 1 August 2011 – 8 May 2014
- President: Laura Chinchilla
- Preceded by: Teófilo de la Torre Argüello
- Succeeded by: Edgar Gutiérrez Espeleta
- In office 8 May 1994 – 8 May 1998
- President: José María Figueres
- Preceded by: Hernán Bravo Trejos
- Succeeded by: Elizabeth Odio Benito

Minister of Foreign Affairs and Worship
- In office 8 May 2010 – 28 July 2011
- President: Laura Chinchilla
- Preceded by: Bruno Stagno Ugarte
- Succeeded by: José Enrique Castillo Barrantes

Secretary-General of the National Liberation Party
- In office 2007–2008
- Preceded by: Óscar Núñez Calvo
- Succeeded by: Ofelia Taitelbaum

Personal details
- Born: René Castro Salazar; 25 August 1957 (age 69) Saint Louis, Missouri, U.S.
- Party: PLN
- Education: University of Costa Rica (BE); Harvard University (PhD)
- Profession: Environmental economics Civil engineer

René Castro Salazar (born 25 August 1957) is a Costa Rican engineer and politician who has served as Assistant Director-General of the Food and Agriculture Organization from 2016 to 2022. He was appointed to lead the Climate, Biodiversity, Land and Water Department by José Graziano da Silva in 2017, after serving one year as Forestry ADG. Formerly, he served under president Laura Chinchilla as Minister of Environment and Energy; position he had also held between 1994 and 1998. Castro held several other relevant governmental positions, including the Ministry of Foreign Affairs during 2010. He is a prominent academic with extensive international experience in the fields of Climate Change, and Sustainable Development.

== Biography ==
=== Family and personal life ===
Son to René Castro Hernández and Giselle Salazar Jirón, an engineer and a teacher respectively, Castro grew up in Liberia, Costa Rica before moving to San José, Costa Rica to continue his studies. On 12 August 1981 he married Sarah Cordero Pinchansky with whom he has two children, Raquel and René.

=== Education ===
Castro holds Doctoral and master's degrees from Harvard University, with an emphasis on Natural Resource Economics and Sustainable Development. He also holds a degree in Civil Engineering from the University of Costa Rica.

== International career ==
=== Public International Career ===
In 2017, after serving one year as Assistant Director-General of, the Director-General of the Food and Agriculture Organization of the United Nations, Jose Graziano da Silva, appointed René Castro as Assistant Director-General of the newly created Climate, Biodiversity, Land and Water Department.

During his tenure as Forestry ADG, Castro advocated for a stronger fight against desertification and illegal timber trade, the recuperation of forest coverage, and their adequate monitoring. He promoted projects with the European Union to combat illegal timber trade, actively spoke in support of the relevance and need for adequate finance for Africas’ Green Wall. At the same time he strongly promoted the transversal relevance of forests for the sustainable management of natural resources and as a strong climate change mitigation and adaptation measure. Under his supervision the FAO-Google partnership to usher a new era of environmental literacy for all developed a study, and subsequent publication, to identify the extent of forest in dryland biomes mapping an additional 9% of global forest cover that was originally unaccounted for; allowing for a more comprehensive estimation of global carbon sinks.

=== Private International Career ===
Castro has been an international consultant for the International Development Bank, the World Bank and various agencies of the United Nations. He has worked and presented conferences in over 60 countries; he has extensive experience in most Latin American countries, in the United States, Canada, Spain, Switzerland, Macedonia, Albania, Montenegro and Serbia. He served as a private consultant offering direct advice to the Governments of Mexico, Argentina, South Africa, El Salvador, Ecuador, Peru, Paraguay, Croatia and Montenegro, and Macedonia, mainly on issues related to Climate Change and Sustainable Development.

== Political career ==
Castro Salazar has held numerous political posts in Costa Rica; he has served as Minister of Foreign Affairs, Minister of Environment and Energy, Deputy Minister of Interior, National Director of Transportation, President of the Municipal Council of San José. He has held various management positions in Costa Rican organizations and was head of the delegations of Costa Rica to the conventions of Biodiversity, Climate Change and Ozone.

=== Minister of Environment and Energy ===
Castro was Minister of Environment and Energy during two periods during the administrations of José María Figueres Olsen (1994–1998) and Laura Chinchilla Miranda (2010-2014).

During his first term, as Minister of Environment, Energy and Mines, he led the promulgation of the Organic Law of the Environment that transformed the ministry of MIRENEM to MINAE, other important laws approved are the forest law, the reform of Article 50 of the Political Constitution to include the right to a healthy environment as a constitutional guarantee and the ratification of global conventions on biodiversity and climate change. Costa Rica led, together with Brazil and other member countries of the group called G77 + China, to include the mechanism for clean development in the Kyoto Protocol, which promoted the transfer of resources from developed countries to others. The main achievement was to consolidate the payment of forest services. This mechanism based on a tax on fossil fuels has allowed Costa Rica to go from an 8% annual rate of deforestation (one of the highest in the world), to grow again in its forest cover in net terms. The country went from 21% of the territory with forest cover in the early 80s to 52.3% by 2013.

Another source of income was sales of CO_{2} bonds. Costa Rica and Norway made the first global transaction, processing 200,000 tons of CO_{2} for $2 million.

The use of lead in fuels was eliminated, according to data from the Children's Hospital, which damaged young children, and it was found that by 1997, the blood lead level of Costa Rican children had dropped to levels below the World Organization health. The reduction of the sulfur content in diesel was initiated and the Central American standard of 500 parts per million was adopted.

On 1 August 2011, Castro was appointed for a second term as Minister of Environment and Energy. On his first day in office, Castro issued a moratorium on oil exploration for the following three years. During his tenure he moved for a closure of zoos, and to keep animals uncaged, promoting more bioparks and recovery shelters.

In his role, as well as in other professional activities, Castro has promoted the payment of environmental services in Costa Rica; he and made the first post Kyoto Protocol CO_{2} transaction in the world. He was negotiator of the conversions of debt of Spain and Canada with Costa Rica and he advised several other countries in their respective negotiations.

Under his management, reforms were pushed to move the telecommunications sector to the Ministry of Science and Technology and to expand MINAE's responsibility for blue policies. The Vice Ministry of Waters and Oceans was established and the expansion of the responsibilities of MINAE in oceans was promoted to all non-commercial biodiversity. Marine protected areas expanded and forest cover growth continued to 54% by the end of 2014. the Montreal Protocol recognized Costa Rica and the Ministry of Environment under Castro for protecting the Ozone layer and being the first country in its region to eliminate the use of methyl bromide for roses, strawberries and flowers.

During this time, he was widely criticized for defending the construction of a $1.500 million refinery for the Costa Rican National Oil Refinery Company (RECOPE) together with the Chinese contractor CNPCI. This project was suspended by the General Comptroller of the Republic due to inconsistencies in the rentability and feasibility studies (developed during the previous government). The developments provoked the exit of the at the time president of the Costa Rican National Oil Refinery (RECOPE) Jorge Villalobos. On the other hand, Castro requested a complete set of studies from the Costa Rican public universities to ensure transparency and thorough review of the proposal.

=== Minister of Foreign Affairs ===
On 2 March 2010, president-elect Laura Chinchilla informed the media that Castro would serve as Minister of Foreign Affairs and Worship from 8 May 2010 (inauguration day). He remained in that position until 1 August 2011. He served in that position from inauguration day (8 May), replacing Bruno Stagno Ugarte. He was replaced in this position on 1 August 2011 by Enrique Castillo, former ambassador to the Organization of American States. This change happened during criticisms of his work handling the conflict of land dispute with Nicaragua by initially approving the work of the Nicaraguan government. For this issue were Castro lacked experience for handling the situation.

During his term, embassies were opened and official visits were made to Qatar and India. Diplomatic representations were reopened in countries such as Bolivia, Jamaica and Paraguay that had ceased operations. The strategy for the defense of Costa Rican sovereignty was led as a peaceful and unarmed one, using only the instruments of international law such as the OAS, the International Court of Justice and the United Nations Security Council. As consecutive steps and in elevation.

Castro was summoned by the Legislative Fraction of the Citizens' Action Party (Costa Rica), which reproached him for allegedly making appointments in the foreign service based on political criteria and not on professional suitability. The then Chancellor held accounts for more than four hours in the Legislative Assembly, where he clarified and answered all the questions raised by the legislators of all the political fractions represented. The executive summary of this appearance can be consulted at the following link: and the complete record "ACTA No. 36" of Thursday, 30 June 2011. On 19 December 2011, the Attorney General's Office forwarded the AEP-AR-009-2011 report to the Ministry of Foreign Affairs, stating there were no irregularities in the professional appointments during his tenure. Castro began negotiations for a concordat with the Vatican. This was strongly criticized by observers who contended that it was a low priority. The previous concordat, which was abrogated during the nineteenth century, was signed in 1852. Thus, for the most part of its republican history, Costa Rica had not had a need of such a treaty with the Vatican. Critics pointed out that granting favourable treatment to the Catholic Church is inherently unfair and anti-democratic, given the large minority presence of other Christian denominations in Costa Rica. Others stated that the committee representing Costa Rica in the Vatican negotiations included Hugo Barrantes, a Costa Rican bishop. It was argued that Barrantes' allegiance would lean towards the Vatican, and not the Costa Rican government, raising doubts about Castro's leadership concerning Costa Rica's foreign affairs.

==== Military invasion by the Nicaraguan Army to Calero Island ====
On 21 October 2010, the Nicaraguan Army invaded the Costa Rican territory of Isla Calero, an islet located in the north-eastern end of the country, initiating a new chapter of the conflict between Costa Rica and Nicaragua. Castro's leadership at the head of the conflict has been defended and criticized. According to some critics, the policy of appeasement followed by Castro Salazar provoked an aggressive behaviour of the president of Nicaragua Daniel Ortega, who ordered to militarily take the territory in dispute. Castro has repeatedly responded to these criticisms in various national media. Under the direction of Foreign Minister Castro, a team of specialists in international law was formed, denouncing the invasion of Nicaragua before the International Court of Justice based in The Hague, obtaining a diplomatic victory in November 2013 when this court issued precautionary measures against Nicaragua, ordering the departure of civilians and soldiers who were illegally occupying the area within a period of no more than two weeks.

=== Other Political Activities ===
==== Campaign Leader Laura Chinchilla Miranda (2009 - 2010) ====
He was appointed chief of the pre-candidacy of then-vice president Laura Chinchilla Miranda and after winning the National Liberation Party primary election, he was appointed head of campaign for the 2010 elections. For the first time, the presidential campaign used a mix of intense social networks combined with the traditional structure of political parties.

==== Vice Minister of Government ====
In 1984 he was appointed deputy minister of governorate and police. The modernization of the rural guard began, including a regime of mutuality and protection, and the National Commission for the fight against illegal drug trafficking was organized. Castro has also been deputy minister of the Interior and Police, and President of San José City Council. He has also served as Secretary General of the National Liberation Party.

==== Council and Municipal President of San José ====
He was elected Council by the National Liberation Party; at the age of 25 he was appointed president of the Municipality of San José, within his proposals was the creation of the serene or municipal police.

==== Student Leader ====
He was elected president of the Federation of Students of the University of Costa Rica in 1978, defeating a coalition of groups of the Costa Rican left.

== Academic career ==
After more than 15 years of working at the Central American Institute of Business Administration (INCAE), he reached the academic degree of "Full Professor" in 2009. He has authored or co-authored four books aimed at academia, in areas such as Project Evaluation, Environment, and Sustainable Development. He has co-authored publications for Yale and Oxford University on Climate Change, and Global Public Goods. He has been invited professor and lecturer at the universities of Harvard, Yale and Columbia in the United States, in the Polytechnic of Valencia, of Zaragoza in Spain; the Zurich Technological Institute (ETH) in Switzerland; the London School of Economics, in England, and at The University of Tokyo and United Nations University, in Japan; as well as in other academic centres in Asia. He has taught classes regularly in schools and engineering institutions in Central America organized within the REDICA Network since 2003.

== Social media ==
Castro has two official public profiles on social media with content mostly in Spanish and English: René Castro Facebook Page, and the Twitter account @RenecastroCR

== Publications ==
- "The extent of forest in dryland biomes" Science 12 May 2017: Vol. 356, Issue 6338, pp. 635–638 doi:10.1126/science.aam6527
- "Eco-Competitiveness and Eco-Efficiency: Carbon Neutrality in Latin America." Policy Brief, Harvard Project on Climate Agreements, Belfer Center for Science and International Affairs, Harvard Kennedy School, November 2015.
- Agriculture, forestry and other land-use in the climate negotiations: a Latin American perspective, Working Papers N°17/2014. IDDRI, 2014
- Tropical forests and the emerging CO_{2} market, Forest Systems, Vol 10 No 3, 2001
- "Evaluación de Proyectos Ambientales"
- "Evaluación de Impacto Ambiental y Sostenibilidad del Desarrollo"
- "Valoración de los servicios ambientales del Bosque: El Caso de Cambio Climático"

== See also ==
- Politics of Costa Rica
