= Luis Liberman =

Costa Rican politician and businessman (born 1946)

Luis Liberman Ginsburg
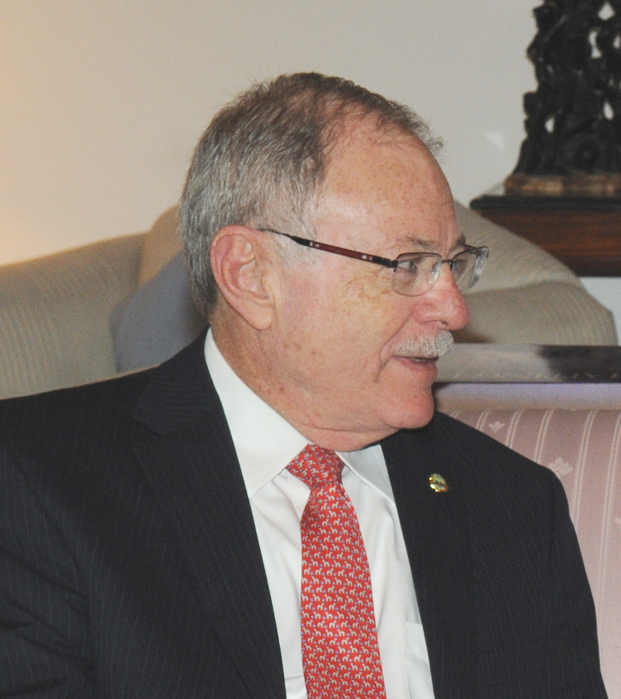
- Liberman in 2012

Second Vice President of Costa Rica
- In office 8 May 2010 – 8 May 2014 Serving with Alfio Piva
- President: Laura Chinchilla
- Preceded by: Kevin Casas Zamora
- Succeeded by: Ana Helena Chacón

Minister of Finance
- In office 2 April 2012 – 1 May 2012
- President: Laura Chinchilla
- Preceded by: Fernando Herrero Acosta
- Succeeded by: Edgar Ayales Esna

Vice Minister of Finance
- In office 16 August 1977 – 8 May 1978
- President: Daniel Oduber Quirós
- Preceded by: Federico Herrera Serrano
- Succeeded by: Leonel Baruch Goldberg

Personal details
- Born: Luis Liberman Ginsburg; 1 August 1946 (age 79) San José, Costa Rica
- Party: PLN
- Spouse: Patricia Loterstein (m. 1974)
- Children: 3
- Education: University of California, Los Angeles (BA); University of Illinois Chicago (PhD)
- Occupation: Economist; politician; businessman; banker; professor

Luis Liberman Ginsburg (born 1 August 1946) is a Costa Rican economist, businessman and politician who served as Second Vice President of Costa Rica from 2010 to 2014. A member of the National Liberation Party, he previously worked as general manager of Scotiabank in Costa Rica from 2006 to 2009 and served in the board of the Costa Rican Institute of Electricity. He was an economics professor at the University of Costa Rica.

Liberman's family moved to Costa Rica from Poland prior to World War II. He is the grandson of the first Mohel of Costa Rica's small Jewish community.

== Politics ==
Liberman was chosen as a vice president to President Laura Chinchilla mainly due to his expertise in economic affairs. He also said that Costa Rica under Chinchilla would be less active in the Middle East and foreign policy would focus more on Latin America while maintaining good relations with Israel, which he described as "excellent" as well as Egypt and other Arab states. He was briefly acting finance minister in 2012.
