= Alfio Piva =

Costa Rican politician and scientist (born 1940)

Alfio Piva Mesén
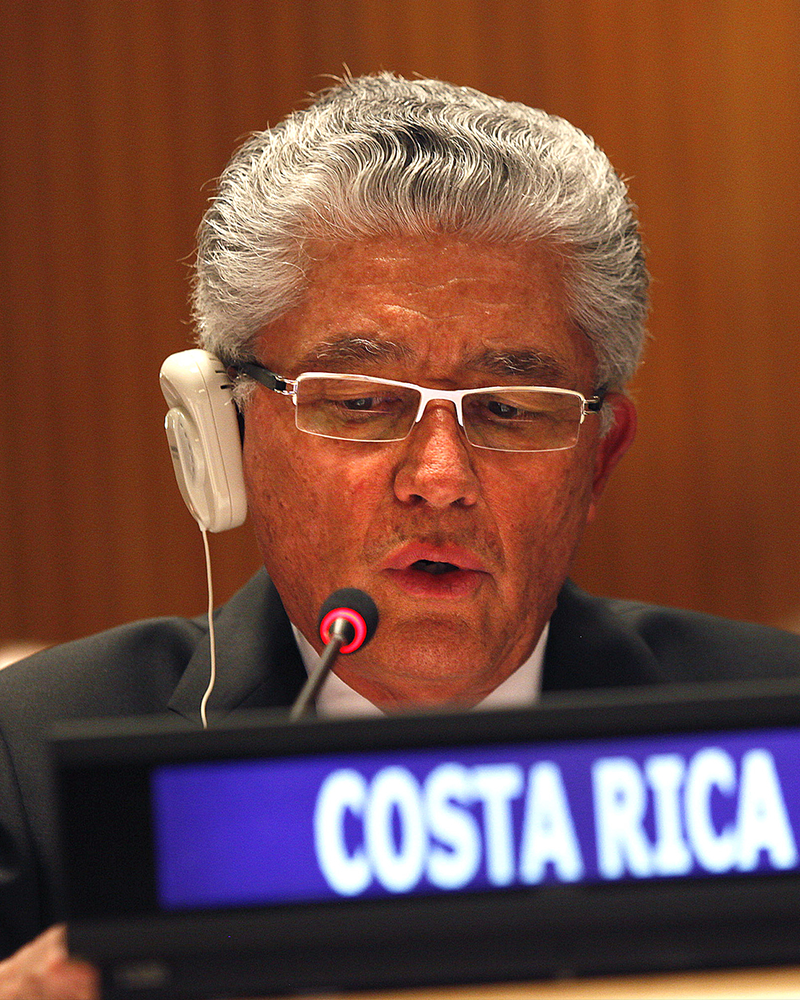
- Piva in 2013

First Vice President of Costa Rica
- In office 8 May 2010 – 8 May 2014
- President: Laura Chinchilla
- Preceded by: Laura Chinchilla
- Succeeded by: Helio Fallas Venegas

2nd Rector of the National University of Costa Rica
- In office 1977–1983
- Preceded by: Benjamín Núñez Vargas
- Succeeded by: Edwin León Villalobos

Personal details
- Born: Alfio Piva Mesén; 9 January 1940 (age 86) San José, Costa Rica
- Party: National Liberation Party
- Spouse: Ginette Rodríguez Vargas (m. 1966)
- Children: 3
- Education: University of Milan (PhD)
- Occupation: Veterinarian; scientist; politician; professor; environmentalist

Alfio Piva Mesén (born 9 January 1940) is a Costa Rican veterinarian, academic and retired politician who served as First Vice President of Costa Rica from 2010 to 2014. A member of the National Liberation Party, he previously served as Rector of the National University of Costa Rica from 1977 to 1983.

Piva obtained a PhD in animal physiology from the University of Milan in Italy and co-founded the Veterinary School of the National University of Costa Rica. In 1995 he won the Prince of Asturias Award in Technical and Scientific Research along with his colleagues from INBio.
