= April 11 =

Date in Gregorian calendars

April 11 this year in various calendars
- Saturday, 11 April 2026
Akan	Fomemene
Armenian	25 Ahekani 1475
Aztec	Tlaxochimaco 11, 1 Quiyahuitl
Babylonian	22 Adaru, 2336 SE
Balinese pawukon	Menga, Pasah, Jaya, Pon, Tungleh, Saniscara of Sinta, Kala, Nohan, Manusa
Bengali	28 Chaitro, BS 1432
Chinese	Yin Wood Rabbit・Girl Mansion; Fire Horse Year, Month 2, Day 24 (Qingming, 9 days until Guyu)
Common Era	11 April 2026 CE
Coptic	3 Parmouti, AM 1742
Egyptian	30 Mesori, 2774 NE
Ethiopian	3 Miyāzyā, 2018 Amätä Məhrät
French Republican	Décade III, Duodi de Germinal de l'Année 234 de la République
Gregorian	11 April, AD 2026
Hebrew	24 Nisan, AM 5786; Omer 9
Hindu	Uttarāṣāḍha・Siddha; Solar: 29 Caitra, 1947 SE; Lunisolar: Navamī, Kṛishna pakṣa of Caitra, 2083 VE; Rāudra・5126 KY・1,872,676
Icelandic	Laugardagur, 19 Einmánuður 2025
Islamic	23 Shawwal, AH 1447 (using tabular method)
ISO week date	2026-W15-6
Japanese	24 Kisaragi, Reiwa 8 (Seimei, 9 days until Kokuu)
Julian	29 March, AD 2026 (AM 7534)
Julian day	2461142
Korean	24 Tokkidal, 4359 DE
Maya	13.0.13.8.19; 12 Pop, 1 Cauac
Roman	ante diem IV Kalendas Apriles, MMDCCLXXIX AUC
Solar Hijri	22 Farvardin, SH 1405
Tibetan	24 dbo, me pho rta 2153 or 1772 or 1000

<<	April					>>
Su	Mo	Tu	We	Th	Fr	Sa
			1	2	3	4
5	6	7	8	9	10	11
12	13	14	15	16	17	18
19	20	21	22	23	24	25
26	27	28	29	30
2026

April 11 in recent years
2026 (Saturday)
2025 (Friday)
2024 (Thursday)
2023 (Tuesday)
2022 (Monday)
2021 (Sunday)
2020 (Saturday)
2019 (Thursday)
2018 (Wednesday)
2017 (Tuesday)

April 11 is the 101st day of the year (102nd in leap years) in the Gregorian calendar; 264 days remain until the end of the year.

== Events ==
=== Pre-1600 ===
- 491 – Flavius Anastasius becomes Byzantine emperor, with the name of Anastasius I.
- 672 – Consecration of Pope Adeodatus II following the death of Pope Vitalian.
- 1241 – Batu Khan defeats Béla IV of Hungary at the Battle of Mohi.
- 1512 – War of the League of Cambrai: Franco-Ferrarese forces led by Gaston de Foix and Alfonso I d'Este win the Battle of Ravenna against the Papal-Spanish forces.
- 1544 – Italian War of 1542–46: A French army defeats Habsburg forces at the Battle of Ceresole, but fails to exploit its victory.

=== 1601–1900 ===
- 1689 – William III and Mary II are crowned as joint sovereigns of Great Britain on the same day that the Scottish Parliament concurs with the English decision of 12 February.
- 1713 – France and Great Britain sign the Treaty of Utrecht, bringing an end to the War of the Spanish Succession (Queen Anne's War). Britain accepts Philip V as King of Spain, while Philip renounces any claim to the French throne.
- 1727 – Premiere of Johann Sebastian Bach's St Matthew Passion BWV 244b at St. Thomas Church in Leipzig, Electorate of Saxony (now Germany).
- 1809 – Battle of the Basque Roads: Admiral Lord Gambier fails to support Captain Lord Cochrane, leading to an incomplete British victory over the French fleet.
- 1814 – The Treaty of Fontainebleau ends the War of the Sixth Coalition against Napoleon Bonaparte, and forces him to abdicate unconditionally for the first time.
- 1856 – Second Battle of Rivas: Juan Santamaría burns down the hostel where William Walker's filibusters are holed up.
- 1868 – Former shōgun Tokugawa Yoshinobu surrenders Edo Castle to Imperial forces, marking the end of the Tokugawa shogunate.
- 1871 - Funeral of Prince Alexander John of Wales at St Mary Magdalene Church, Sandringham.
- 1876 – The Benevolent and Protective Order of Elks is organized.
- 1881 – Spelman College is founded in Atlanta, Georgia, as the Atlanta Baptist Female Seminary, an institute of higher education for African-American women.
- 1885 – Luton Town F.C. is founded.

=== 1901–present ===
- 1908 – SMS Blücher, the last armored cruiser to be built by the Imperial German Navy, is launched.
- 1909 – The city of Tel Aviv is founded.
- 1921 – Emir Abdullah establishes the first centralised government in the newly created British protectorate of Transjordan.
- 1935 – Stresa Front: Opening of the conference between the British Prime Minister Ramsay MacDonald, the Italian Prime Minister Benito Mussolini and the French Minister for Foreign Affairs Pierre Laval to condemn the German violations of the Treaty of Versailles.
- 1945 – World War II: American forces liberate the Buchenwald concentration camp.
- 1951 – Korean War: President Truman relieves Douglas MacArthur of the command of American forces in Korea and Japan.
- 1951 – The Stone of Scone, the stone upon which Scottish monarchs were traditionally crowned, is found on the site of the altar of Arbroath Abbey. It had been taken by Scottish nationalist students from its place in Westminster Abbey.
- 1952 – Bolivian National Revolution: Rebels take over Palacio Quemado.
- 1952 – Pan Am Flight 526A ditches near San Juan-Isla Grande Airport in San Juan, Puerto Rico, after experiencing an engine failure, killing 52 people.
- 1955 – The Air India Kashmir Princess is bombed and crashes in a failed assassination attempt on Zhou Enlai by the Kuomintang.
- 1957 – United Kingdom agrees to Singaporean self-rule.
- 1961 – The trial of Adolf Eichmann begins in Jerusalem.
- 1963 – Pope John XXIII issues Pacem in terris, the first encyclical addressed to all Christians instead of only Catholics, and which described the conditions for world peace in human terms.
- 1964 – Brazilian Marshal Humberto de Alencar Castelo Branco is elected president by the National Congress.
- 1965 – The Palm Sunday tornado outbreak of 1965: Fifty-five tornadoes hit in six Midwestern states of the United States, killing 266 people.
- 1968 – US President Lyndon B. Johnson signs the Civil Rights Act of 1968, prohibiting discrimination in the sale, rental, and financing of housing.
- 1968 – A failed assassination attempt on Rudi Dutschke, leader of the German student movement, leaves Dutschke suffering from brain damage.
- 1970 – Apollo Program: Apollo 13 is launched.
- 1976 – The Apple I is created.
- 1977 – London Transport's Silver Jubilee AEC Routemaster buses are launched.
- 1979 – Ugandan dictator Idi Amin is deposed.
- 1981 – A massive riot in Brixton, south London, results in almost 300 police injuries and 65 serious civilian injuries.
- 1982 – American-Israeli reservist Alan Harry Goodman carries out a mass shooting at the Dome of the Rock, killing two Palestinians and injuring at least seven others.
- 1986 – FBI Miami Shootout: A gun battle in broad daylight in Dade County, Florida, between two bank/armored car robbers and pursuing FBI agents. During the firefight, FBI agents Jerry L. Dove and Benjamin P. Grogan are killed, while five other agents are wounded. As a result, the popular .40 S&W cartridge was developed.
- 1987 – The London Agreement is secretly signed between Israeli Foreign Affairs Minister Shimon Peres and King Hussein of Jordan.
- 1990 – Customs officers in Middlesbrough, England, seize what they believe to be the barrel of a massive gun on a ship bound for Iraq.
- 1993 – Four hundred fifty prisoners riot at the Southern Ohio Correctional Facility in Lucasville, Ohio, and would continue to do so for ten days, citing grievances related to prison conditions, as well as the forced vaccination of Nation of Islam prisoners (for tuberculosis) against their religious beliefs.
- 1993 – Guillem Agulló, pro-Catalan independence and anti-fascist Valencian young activist, is assassinated by a group of Spanish nationalists and neo-nazis in Montanejos.
- 2001 – The detained crew of a United States EP-3E aircraft that landed in Hainan, China, after a collision with a J-8 fighter, is released.
- 2001 – The Australia national men's soccer team sets a world record for the largest victory in an international association football match, winning the game 31–0 against American Samoa at the 2002 FIFA World Cup qualifiers for OFC. Australia's Archie Thompson also breaks the record for most goals scored by a player in an international match by scoring 13 goals.
- 2002 – The Ghriba synagogue bombing by al-Qaeda kills 21 in Tunisia.
- 2002 – Over two hundred thousand people march in Caracas towards the presidential palace to demand the resignation of President Hugo Chávez. Nineteen protesters are killed.
- 2006 – Iranian president Mahmoud Ahmadinejad announces Iran's claim to have successfully enriched uranium.
- 2007 – Algiers bombings: Two bombings in Algiers kill 33 people and wound a further 222 others.
- 2008 – Kata Air Transport Flight 007 crashes while attempting an emergency landing at Chișinău International Airport, killing eight.
- 2011 – An explosion in the Minsk Metro, Belarus, kills 15 people and injures 204 others.
- 2012 – A pair of great earthquakes occur in the Wharton Basin west of Sumatra in Indonesia. The maximum Mercalli intensity of this strike-slip doublet earthquake is VII (Very strong). Ten are killed, twelve are injured, and a non-destructive tsunami is observed on the island of Nias.
- 2017 – The tour bus of the German football team Borussia Dortmund is attacked with roadside bombs in Dortmund, Germany. Three bombs exploded as the bus ferried the team to the Westfalenstadion for the first leg of their quarter-final against Monaco.
- 2018 – An Ilyushin Il-76 owned and operated by the Algerian Air Force crashes near Boufarik, Algeria, killing 257.
- 2021 – Twenty-year-old Daunte Wright is shot and killed in Brooklyn Center, Minnesota, by officer Kimberly Potter, sparking protests in the city, when the officer mistakes her pistol for her taser.
- 2023 – During the Pazigyi massacre, an airstrike conducted by the Myanmar Air Force kills at least 100 villagers in Pazigyi, Sagaing Region.

== Births ==
=== Pre-1600 ===
- 145 – Septimius Severus, Roman emperor (probable; died 211)
- 1184 – William of Winchester, Lord of Lüneburg (died 1213)
- 1348 – Andronikos IV Palaiologos, Byzantine Emperor (died 1385)
- 1357 – John I of Portugal (died 1433)
- 1370 – Frederick I, Elector of Saxony (died 1428)
- 1374 – Roger Mortimer, 4th Earl of March, heir to the throne of England (died 1398)
- 1493 – George I, Duke of Pomerania (died 1531)
- 1591 – Bartholomeus Strobel, Silezian painter (died 1650)
- 1592 – John Eliot, English lawyer and politician (died 1632)

=== 1601–1900 ===
- 1644 – Marie Jeanne Baptiste of Savoy-Nemours, Duchess of Savoy (died 1724)
- 1658 – James Hamilton, 4th Duke of Hamilton, Scottish peer (died 1712)
- 1683 – Jean-Joseph Mouret, French composer and conductor (died 1738)
- 1715 – John Alcock, English organist and composer (died 1806)
- 1721 – David Zeisberger, Czech-American clergyman and missionary (died 1808)
- 1722 – Christopher Smart, English actor, playwright, and poet (died 1771)
- 1749 – Adélaïde Labille-Guiard, French miniaturist and portrait painter (died 1803)
- 1755 – James Parkinson, English surgeon, geologist, and paleontologist (died 1824)
- 1770 – George Canning, Irish-English lawyer and politician, Prime Minister of the United Kingdom (died 1827)
- 1794 – Edward Everett, English-American educator and politician, 15th Governor of Massachusetts (died 1865)
- 1798 – Macedonio Melloni, Italian physicist and academic (died 1854)
- 1819 – Charles Hallé, German-English pianist and conductor (died 1895)
- 1825 – Ferdinand Lassalle, German philosopher and jurist (died 1864)
- 1827 – Jyotirao Phule, Indian scholar, philosopher, and activist (died 1890)
- 1830 – John Douglas, English architect (died 1911)
- 1837 – Elmer E. Ellsworth, American army officer and law clerk (died 1861)
- 1854 – Hugh Massie, Australian cricketer (died 1938)
- 1856 – Arthur Shrewsbury, English cricketer and rugby player (died 1903)
- 1859 – Stefanos Thomopoulos, Greek historian and author (died 1939)
- 1862 – William Wallace Campbell, American astronomer and academic (died 1938)
- 1862 – Charles Evans Hughes, American lawyer and politician, 44th United States Secretary of State (died 1948)
- 1864 – Johanna Elberskirchen, German author and activist (died 1943)
- 1866 – Bernard O'Dowd, Australian journalist, author, and poet (died 1953)
- 1867 – Mark Keppel, American educator (died 1928)
- 1869 – Gustav Vigeland, Norwegian sculptor, designed the Nobel Peace Prize medal (died 1943)
- 1871 – Gyula Kellner, Hungarian runner (died 1940)
- 1872 – Aleksandër Stavre Drenova, Albanian poet, rilindas and author of national anthem of Albania (died 1947)
- 1873 – Edward Lawson, English soldier, Victoria Cross recipient (died 1955)
- 1876 – Paul Henry, Irish painter (died 1958)
- 1876 – Ivane Javakhishvili, Georgian historian and academic (died 1940)
- 1878 – Percy Lane Oliver, British pioneer of volunteer blood donation (died 1944)
- 1879 – Bernhard Schmidt, Estonian-German astronomer and optician (died 1935)
- 1887 – Jamini Roy, Indian painter (died 1972)
- 1893 – Dean Acheson, American lawyer and politician, 51st United States Secretary of State (died 1971)
- 1896 – Léo-Paul Desrosiers, Canadian journalist and author (died 1967)
- 1899 – Percy Lavon Julian, African-American chemist and academic (died 1975)
- 1900 – Sándor Márai, Hungarian journalist and author (died 1989)

=== 1901–present ===
- 1903 – Misuzu Kaneko, Japanese poet (died 1930)
- 1904 – K. L. Saigal, Indian singer and actor (died 1947)
- 1905 – Attila József, Hungarian poet and educator (died 1937)
- 1906 – Dale Messick, American author and illustrator (died 2005)
- 1907 – Paul Douglas, American actor (died 1959)
- 1908 – Jane Bolin, American lawyer and judge (died 2007)
- 1908 – Masaru Ibuka, Japanese businessman, co-founded Sony (died 1997)
- 1908 – Dan Maskell, English tennis player and sportscaster (died 1992)
- 1908 – Leo Rosten, Polish-American author and academic (died 1997)
- 1910 – António de Spínola, Portuguese general and politician, 14th President of Portugal (died 1996)
- 1912 – John Levy, American bassist and businessman (died 2012)
- 1913 – Oleg Cassini, French-American fashion designer (died 2006)
- 1914 – Norman McLaren, Scottish-Canadian animator, director, and producer (died 1987)
- 1914 – Robert Stanfield, Canadian economist, lawyer, and politician, 17th Premier of Nova Scotia (died 2003)
- 1914 – Dorothy Lewis Bernstein, American mathematician (died 1988)
- 1916 – Alberto Ginastera, Argentinian pianist and composer (died 1983)
- 1916 – Howard W. Koch, American director and producer (died 2001)
- 1917 – David Westheimer, American soldier, journalist, and author (died 2005)
- 1918 – Richard Wainwright, English soldier and politician (died 2003)
- 1919 – Raymond Carr, English historian and academic (died 2015)
- 1920 – Emilio Colombo, Italian lawyer and politician, 40th Prime Minister of Italy (died 2013)
- 1920 – William Royer, American soldier and politician (died 2013)
- 1921 – Jim Hearn, American baseball player (died 1998)
- 1921 – Jack Rayner, Australian rugby league player and coach (died 2008)
- 1922 – Arved Viirlaid, Estonian-Canadian soldier and author (died 2015)
- 1923 – George J. Maloof, Sr., American businessman (died 1980)
- 1924 – Mohammad Naseem, Pakistani-English activist and politician (died 2014)
- 1925 – Yuriy Lituyev, Russian hurdler and commander (died 2000)
- 1925 – Viola Liuzzo, American civil rights activist (died 1965)
- 1925 – Viktor Masing, Estonian botanist and ecologist (died 2001)
- 1925 – Pierre Péladeau, Canadian businessman, founded Quebecor (died 1997)
- 1926 – David Manker Abshire, American commander and diplomat, United States Permanent Representative to NATO (died 2014)
- 1926 – Victor Bouchard, Canadian pianist and composer (died 2011)
- 1926 – Karl Rebane, Estonian physicist and academic (died 2007)
- 1927 – Lokesh Chandra, Indian historian
- 1928 – Ethel Kennedy, American philanthropist (died 2024)
- 1928 – Edwin Pope, American journalist and author (died 2017)
- 1928 – Tommy Tycho, Hungarian-Australian pianist, composer, and conductor (died 2013)
- 1930 – Nicholas F. Brady, American businessman and politician, 68th United States Secretary of the Treasury
- 1930 – Walter Krüger, German javelin thrower (died 2018)
- 1930 – Anton LaVey, American occultist, founded the Church of Satan (died 1997)
- 1931 – Lewis Jones, Welsh rugby player and coach (died 2024)
- 1932 – Joel Grey, American actor, singer, and dancer
- 1933 – Tony Brown, American journalist and academic
- 1934 – Mark Strand, Canadian-born American poet, essayist, and translator (died 2014)
- 1934 – Ron Pember, English actor, director and playwright (died 2022)
- 1935 – Richard Berry, American singer-songwriter (died 1997)
- 1936 – Brian Noble, English bishop (died 2019)
- 1937 – Jill Gascoine, English actress and author (died 2020)
- 1938 – Gerry Baker, American soccer player and manager (died 2013)
- 1938 – Michael Deaver, American politician, Deputy White House Chief of Staff (died 2007)
- 1938 – Reatha King, American chemist and businesswoman
- 1939 – Luther "Guitar Junior" Johnson, American singer and guitarist (died 2022)
- 1939 – Louise Lasser, American actress
- 1940 – Col Firmin, Australian politician (died 2013)
- 1940 – Władysław Komar, Polish shot putter and actor (died 1998)
- 1941 – Ellen Goodman, American journalist and author
- 1941 – Shirley Stelfox, English actress (died 2015)
- 1942 – Anatoly Berezovoy, Russian colonel, pilot, and astronaut (died 2014)
- 1942 – Hattie Gossett, American writer
- 1942 – James Underwood, English pathologist and academic
- 1943 – John Montagu, 11th Earl of Sandwich, English businessman and politician
- 1943 – Harley Race, American wrestler and trainer (died 2019)
- 1944 – Peter Barfuß, German footballer
- 1944 – John Milius, American director, producer, and screenwriter
- 1945 – John Krebs, Baron Krebs, English zoologist and academic
- 1946 – Chris Burden, American sculptor, illustrator, and academic (died 2015)
- 1946 – Bob Harris, English journalist and radio host
- 1947 – Lev Bulat, Ukrainian-Russian physicist and academic (died 2016)
- 1947 – Uli Edel, German director and screenwriter
- 1947 – Frank Mantooth, American pianist and composer (died 2004)
- 1947 – Peter Riegert, American actor, screenwriter and film director
- 1947 – Michael T. Wright, English engineer and academic (died 2015)
- 1949 – Dorothy Allison, American writer (died 2024)
- 1949 – Bernd Eichinger, German director and producer (died 2011)
- 1950 – Bill Irwin, American actor and clown
- 1951 – Paul Fox, English singer and guitarist (died 2007)
- 1952 – Nancy Honeytree, American singer and guitarist
- 1952 – Indira Samarasekera, Sri Lankan engineer and academic
- 1952 – Peter Windsor, English-Australian journalist and sportscaster
- 1953 – Guy Verhofstadt, Belgian politician, 47th Prime Minister of Belgium
- 1953 – Andrew Wiles, English mathematician and academic
- 1954 – Abdullah Atalar, Turkish engineer and academic
- 1954 – Aleksandr Averin, Azerbaijani cyclist and coach
- 1954 – Francis Lickerish, English guitarist and composer
- 1954 – David Perrett, Scottish psychologist and academic
- 1954 – Ian Redmond, English biologist and conservationist
- 1954 – Willie Royster, American baseball player (died 2015)
- 1955 – Kevin Brady, American lawyer and politician
- 1955 – Michael Callen, American singer-songwriter and AIDS activist (died 1993)
- 1955 – Micheal Ray Richardson, American basketball player and coach (died 2025)
- 1957 – Tessa Dahl, daughter of Roald Dahl and Patricia Neal
- 1958 – Stuart Adamson, Scottish singer-songwriter and guitarist (died 2001)
- 1958 – Lyudmila Kondratyeva, Russian sprinter
- 1958 – Wayne Wigham, Australian rugby league player
- 1959 – Pierre Lacroix, Canadian ice hockey player
- 1959 – Ana María Polo, Cuban-American lawyer and judge
- 1959 – Zahid Maleque, Bangladeshi politician
- 1960 – Jeremy Clarkson, English journalist and television presenter
- 1961 – Vincent Gallo, American actor, director, producer, and musician
- 1961 – Doug Hopkins, American guitarist and songwriter (died 1993)
- 1961 – Nobuaki Kakuda, Japanese martial artist
- 1962 – Franck Ducheix, French fencer
- 1962 – Mark Lawson, English journalist and author
- 1963 – Billy Bowden, New Zealand cricketer and umpire
- 1963 – Waldemar Fornalik, Polish footballer and manager
- 1963 – Elizabeth Smylie, Australian tennis player
- 1963 – Eleni Tsaligopoulou, Greek singer
- 1964 – Steve Azar, American singer-songwriter and guitarist
- 1964 – John Cryer, English journalist and politician
- 1964 – Johann Sebastian Paetsch, American cellist
- 1964 – Bret Saberhagen, American baseball player and coach
- 1964 – Patrick Sang, Kenyan runner
- 1966 – Steve Scarsone, American baseball player and manager
- 1966 – Shin Seung-hun, South Korean singer-songwriter
- 1966 – Lisa Stansfield, English singer-songwriter and actress
- 1968 – Sergei Lukyanenko, Kazakh-Russian journalist and author
- 1969 – Cerys Matthews, Welsh singer-songwriter
- 1969 – Dustin Rhodes, American wrestler
- 1969 – Michael von Grünigen, Swiss skier
- 1970 – Trevor Linden, Canadian ice hockey player and manager
- 1970 – Whigfield, Danish singer and songwriter
- 1971 – Oliver Riedel, German bass player
- 1972 – Balls Mahoney, American wrestler (died 2016)
- 1972 – Allan Théo, French singer
- 1972 – Jason Varitek, American baseball player and manager
- 1973 – Olivier Magne, French rugby player
- 1973 – Jennifer Esposito, American actress and writer
- 1974 – Àlex Corretja, Spanish tennis player and coach
- 1974 – Ashot Danielyan, Armenian weightlifter
- 1974 – David Jassy, Swedish singer-songwriter and producer
- 1974 – Tom Thacker, Canadian singer-songwriter, guitarist, and producer
- 1974 – Trot Nixon, American baseball player and sportscaster
- 1976 – Marta Breen, Norwegian journalist, non-fiction writer, and organizational leader
- 1976 – Kelvim Escobar, Venezuelan baseball player
- 1976 – Kotomitsuki Keiji, Japanese sumo wrestler
- 1977 – Ivonne Teichmann, German runner
- 1979 – Malcolm Christie, English footballer
- 1979 – Sebastien Grainger, Canadian singer-songwriter and guitarist
- 1979 – Michel Riesen, Swiss ice hockey player
- 1980 – Keiji Tamada, Japanese footballer
- 1980 – Mark Teixeira, American baseball player
- 1981 – Alessandra Ambrosio, Brazilian model
- 1981 – Alexandre Burrows, Canadian ice hockey player
- 1981 – Luis Flores, Dominican basketball player
- 1981 – Veronica Pyke, Australian cricketer
- 1982 – Ian Bell, English cricketer
- 1982 – Peeter Kümmel, Estonian skier
- 1983 – Jennifer Heil, Canadian skier
- 1983 – Rubén Palazuelos, Spanish footballer
- 1984 – Kelli Garner, American actress
- 1984 – Nikola Karabatić, French handball player
- 1985 – Pablo Hernández Domínguez, Spanish footballer
- 1986 – Sarodj Bertin, Haitian model and human rights lawyer
- 1986 – Lena Schöneborn, German pentathlete
- 1987 – Joss Stone, English singer-songwriter and actress
- 1987 – Lights, Canadian singer-songwriter
- 1988 – Milton Casco, Argentine footballer
- 1988 – Leland Irving, Canadian ice hockey player
- 1989 – Torrin Lawrence, American sprinter (died 2014)
- 1990 – Dimitrios Anastasopoulos, Greek footballer
- 1990 – Thulani Serero, South African footballer
- 1991 – Thiago Alcântara, Spanish footballer
- 1991 – Cédric Bakambu, Congolese footballer
- 1991 – Brennan Poole, American racing driver
- 1992 – Sinem Dybvad Demir, Danish politician
- 1993 – Florin Andone, Romanian footballer
- 1994 – Brandon Montour, Canadian ice hockey player
- 1996 – Dele Alli, English international footballer
- 1996 – Summer Walker, American singer-songwriter
- 2000 – Calen Addison, Canadian ice hockey player
- 2000 – Milly Alcock, Australian actress
- 2000 – Loïc Badé, French footballer
- 2000 – Ken Carson, American rapper and record producer
- 2000 – Karina, South Korean singer
- 2001 – Manuel Ugarte, Uruguayan footballer
- 2002 – Jake Fraser-McGurk, Australian cricketer
- 2005 – Jack Hinshelwood, English footballer
- 2005 – Danielle Marsh, South Korean-Australian singer
- 2014 – Arabella Stanton, British actress, plays Hermione Granger

== Deaths ==
=== Pre-1600 ===
- 618 – Yang Guang, Chinese emperor of the Sui Dynasty (born 569)
- 678 – Donus, pope of the Catholic Church (born 610)
- 924 – Herman I, chancellor and archbishop of Cologne
- 1034 – Romanos III Argyros, Byzantine emperor (born 968)
- 1077 – Anawrahta, king of Burma and founder of the Pagan Empire (born 1014)
- 1079 – Stanislaus of Szczepanów, bishop of Kraków (born 1030)
- 1165 – Stephen IV, king of Hungary and Croatia
- 1240 – Llywelyn the Great, Welsh prince (born 1172)
- 1349 – Ramadan ibn Alauddin, first known Muslim from Korea
- 1447 – Henry Beaufort, Cardinal, Lord Chancellor of England (born 1377)
- 1512 – Gaston de Foix, French military commander (born 1489)
- 1554 – Thomas Wyatt the Younger, English rebel leader (born 1521)
- 1587 – Thomas Bromley, English lord chancellor (born 1530)

=== 1601–1900 ===
- 1609 – John Lumley, 1st Baron Lumley, English noble (born 1533)
- 1612 – Emanuel van Meteren, Flemish historian and author (born 1535)
- 1612 – Edward Wightman, English minister and martyr (born 1566)
- 1626 – Marino Ghetaldi, Ragusan mathematician and physicist (born 1568)
- 1712 – Richard Simon, French priest and critic (born 1638)
- 1723 – John Robinson, English bishop and diplomat (born 1650)
- 1783 – Nikita Ivanovich Panin, Polish-Russian politician, Russian Minister of Foreign Affairs (born 1718)
- 1798 – Karl Wilhelm Ramler, German poet and academic (born 1725)
- 1856 – Juan Santamaría, Costa Rican soldier (born 1831)
- 1861 – Francisco González Bocanegra, Mexican poet and composer (born 1824)
- 1870 – Justo José de Urquiza, Argentine general, politician and first constitutional president of Argentina (born 1801)
- 1873 – Edward Canby, American general (born 1817)
- 1890 – David de Jahacob Lopez Cardozo, Dutch Talmudist (born 1808)
- 1890 – Joseph Merrick, English man with severe deformities (born 1862)
- 1894 – Constantin Lipsius, German architect and theorist (born 1832)
- 1895 – Julius Lothar Meyer, German chemist (born 1830)

=== 1901–present ===
- 1902 – Wade Hampton III, Confederate general and politician, 77th Governor of South Carolina (born 1818)
- 1903 – Gemma Galgani, Italian mystic and saint (born 1878)
- 1906 – James Anthony Bailey, American businessman, co-founded Ringling Bros. and Barnum & Bailey Circus (born 1847)
- 1906 – Francis Pharcellus Church, American journalist and publisher, co-founded Armed Forces Journal and The Galaxy Magazine (born 1839)
- 1908 – Henry Bird, English chess player and author (born 1829)
- 1916 – Richard Harding Davis, American journalist and author (born 1864)
- 1918 – Otto Wagner, Austrian architect and urban planner (born 1841)
- 1926 – Luther Burbank, American botanist and academic (born 1849)
- 1939 – Kurtdereli Mehmet, Turkish wrestler (born 1864)
- 1953 – Kid Nichols, American baseball player and manager (born 1869)
- 1954 – Paul Specht, American violinist and bandleader (born 1895)
- 1958 – Konstantin Yuon, Russian painter and educator (born 1875)
- 1960 – Rosa Grünberg, Swedish actress (born 1878)
- 1962 – Ukichiro Nakaya, Japanese physicist and academic (born 1900)
- 1962 – George Poage, American hurdler and educator (born 1880)
- 1962 – Axel Revold, Norwegian painter (born 1887)
- 1967 – Thomas Farrell, American general (born 1891)
- 1967 – Donald Sangster, Jamaican lawyer and politician, 2nd Prime Minister of Jamaica (born 1911)
- 1970 – Cathy O'Donnell, American actress (born 1923)
- 1970 – John O'Hara, American novelist and short story writer (born 1905)
- 1974 – Ernst Ziegler, German actor (born 1894)
- 1977 – Jacques Prévert, French poet and screenwriter (born 1900)
- 1977 – Phanishwar Nath 'Renu', Indian author and activist (born 1921)
- 1980 – Ümit Kaftancıoğlu, Turkish journalist and producer (born 1935)
- 1981 – Caroline Gordon, American author and critic (born 1895)
- 1983 – Dolores del Río, Mexican actress (born 1904)
- 1984 – Edgar V. Saks, Estonian historian and politician, Estonian Minister of Education (born 1910)
- 1985 – Bunny Ahearne, Irish-born English businessman (born 1900)
- 1985 – John Gilroy, English artist and illustrator (born 1898)
- 1985 – Enver Hoxha, Albanian educator and politician, 21st Prime Minister of Albania (born 1908)
- 1987 – Erskine Caldwell, American novelist and short story writer (born 1903)
- 1987 – Primo Levi, Italian chemist and author (born 1919)
- 1990 – Harold Ballard, Canadian businessman (born 1903)
- 1991 – Walker Cooper, American baseball player and manager (born 1915)
- 1991 – Bruno Hoffmann. German glass harp player (born 1913)
- 1992 – James Brown, American actor and singer (born 1920)
- 1992 – Eve Merriam, American author and poet (born 1916)
- 1992 – Alejandro Obregón, Colombian painter, sculptor, and engraver (born 1920)
- 1996 – Jessica Dubroff, American pilot (born 1988)
- 1997 – Muriel McQueen Fergusson, Canadian lawyer and politician, Canadian Speaker of the Senate (born 1899)
- 1997 – Wang Xiaobo, contemporary Chinese novelist and essayist (born 1952)
- 1999 – William H. Armstrong, American author and educator (born 1911)
- 2000 – Diana Darvey, English actress, singer and dancer (born 1945)
- 2001 – Harry Secombe, Welsh-English actor (born 1921)
- 2003 – Cecil Howard Green, English-American geophysicist and businessman, founded Texas Instruments (born 1900)
- 2005 – André François, Romanian-French cartoonist, painter, and sculptor (born 1915)
- 2005 – Lucien Laurent, French footballer and coach (born 1907)
- 2006 – June Pointer, American singer (born 1953)
- 2006 – DeShaun Holton, American rapper and actor (born 1973)
- 2007 – Roscoe Lee Browne, American actor and director (born 1922)
- 2007 – Loïc Leferme, French diver (born 1970)
- 2007 – Janet McDonald, American lawyer and author (born 1954)
- 2007 – Ronald Speirs, Scottish-American colonel (born 1920)
- 2007 – Kurt Vonnegut, American novelist, short story writer, and playwright (born 1922)
- 2008 – Merlin German, American sergeant (born 1985)
- 2009 – Gerda Gilboe, Danish actress and singer (born 1914)
- 2009 – Vishnu Prabhakar, Indian author and playwright (born 1912)
- 2009 – Corín Tellado, Spanish author (born 1927)
- 2010 – Julia Tsenova, Bulgarian pianist and composer (born 1948)
- 2011 – Larry Sweeney, American wrestler and manager (born 1981)
- 2012 – Ahmed Ben Bella, Algerian soldier and politician, 1st President of Algeria (born 1916)
- 2012 – Roger Caron, Canadian criminal and author (born 1938)
- 2012 – Tippy Dye, American basketball player and coach (born 1915)
- 2012 – Hal McKusick, American saxophonist, clarinet player, and flute player (born 1924)
- 2012 – Agustin Roman, American bishop (born 1928)
- 2013 – Don Blackman, American singer-songwriter, pianist, and producer (born 1953)
- 2013 – Sue Draheim, American fiddler (born1949)
- 2013 – Grady Hatton, American baseball player, coach, and manager (born 1922)
- 2013 – Thomas Hemsley, English actor and singer (born 1927)
- 2013 – Hilary Koprowski, Polish-American virologist and immunologist (born 1916)
- 2013 – Gilles Marchal, French singer-songwriter (born 1944)
- 2013 – Maria Tallchief, American ballerina (born 1925)
- 2013 – Clorindo Testa, Italian-Argentinian architect (born 1923)
- 2013 – Jonathan Winters, American comedian, actor and screenwriter (born 1925)
- 2014 – Rolf Brem, Swiss sculptor and illustrator (born 1926)
- 2014 – Edna Doré, English actress (born 1921)
- 2014 – Bill Henry, American baseball player (born 1927)
- 2014 – Lou Hudson, American basketball player and sportscaster (born 1944)
- 2014 – Myer S. Kripke, American rabbi and scholar (born 1914)
- 2014 – Sergey Nepobedimy, Russian engineer (born 1921)
- 2014 – Jesse Winchester, American singer-songwriter, guitarist, and producer (born 1944)
- 2015 – Jimmy Gunn, American football player (born 1948)
- 2015 – Muhammad Kamaruzzaman, Bangladeshi journalist and politician (born 1952)
- 2015 – François Maspero, French journalist and author (born 1932)
- 2015 – Hanut Singh, Indian general (born 1933)
- 2015 – Tekena Tamuno, Nigerian historian and academic (born 1932)
- 2017 – J. Geils, American singer and guitarist (born 1946)
- 2017 – Mark Wainberg, Canadian researcher and HIV/AIDS activist (born 1945)
- 2020 – John Horton Conway, English mathematician (born 1937)
- 2021 – Mauro Viale, Argentine journalist (born 1947)
- 2024 – Park Bo-ram, South Korean singer (born 1994)
- 2025 – Mike Berry, British singer and actor (born 1942)
- 2026 – Phil Garner, American baseball player and manager (born 1949)

== Holidays and observances ==
- Christian feast day:
  - Antipas of Pergamum (Greek Orthodox Church)
  - Barsanuphius
  - Elena Guerra
  - Gemma Galgani
  - Blessed George Gervase
  - Godeberta
  - Guthlac of Crowland
  - George Selwyn (Anglicanism)
  - Stanislaus of Szczepanów
  - April 11 (Eastern Orthodox liturgics)
- Juan Santamaría Day, anniversary of his death in the Second Battle of Rivas. (Costa Rica)
- International Louie Louie Day
- World Parkinson's Day
