= Bulatović =

Bulatović (Cyrillic: Булатовић) is a Montenegrin and Serbian surname. Notable people with the name include:

- Anđela Bulatović (born 1987), Montenegrin handball player
- Andrija Bulatović (born 2006), Montenegrin footballer
- Blažo Bulatović (born 1990), Serbian football manager and former player, son of Branko
- Branko Bulatović (1951–2004), Montenegrin football administrator
- Darko Bulatović (born 1989), Montenegrin footballer
- Dejan Bulatović (born 1975), Serbian politician
- Ivana Bulatović (born 1994), Montenegrin alpine skier
- Katarina Bulatović (born 1984), Serbian-born Montenegrin handball player
- Ksenija Bulatović (born 1967), Serbian architect
- Marija Bulatović (born 1995), Montenegrin cross-country skier
- Miodrag Bulatović (1930–1991), Serbian novelist
- Nedeljko Bulatović (1939–2023), Serbian football player and manager
- Nikola Bulatović (born 1971), Montenegrin basketball coach and former player
- Nina Bulatović (born 1996), Montenegrin handball player
- Momir Bulatović (1956–2019), Montenegrin and Yugoslav politician
- Pavle Bulatović (1948–2000), Montenegrin and Yugoslav politician
- Predrag Bulatović (born 1956), Montenegrin politician
- Rade Bulatović, former head of Serbia's intelligence agency, the Security Intelligence Agency
- Radoš Bulatović (born 1984), Serbian footballer
- Slađana Bulatović (born 1994), Montenegrin footballer
- Slaviša Bulatović (born 1975), Serbian politician
- Vladimir Bulatović Vib (1931–1994), Serbian writer

== See also ==
- Bulatov
- Bulat
