= Bulat =

Bulat is both a masculine give name and surname with various origins. As a masculine given name, it is derived from a Russian word meaning "steel", ultimately from Persian پولاد (pulâd). From Middle Persian (pwlʾpt'), 𐫛𐫇𐫓𐫀𐫇𐫅 (pwlʾwd /pōlāwad/). Cognate with Iranian borrowing Old Armenian պողովատ (połovat), պողոպատ (połopat).

There are patronymic surnames derived from it: Bulatov, Bulatović.

Notable people with the surname include:

- Alexandra Bulat, Romanian-English politician
- Basia Bulat (born 1984), Canadian singer-songwriter
- Gajo Bulat (1836–1900), Croatian lawyer and politician
- Gajo Bulat (1867–1927), Croatian lawyer and politician
- Iurie Bulat (born 1994), Moldovan weightlifter
- Ivan Bulat (born 1975), Croatian football player
- Lev Bulat (1947–2016), Russian physicist
- Marko Bulat (singer) (born 1973), Serbian pop-folk singer and musician
- Marko Bulat (footballer), Croatian football midfielder
- Nicolae Bulat (1952–2022), Moldovan historian
- Nikol Bulat (born 1987), Croatian singer
- Rade Bulat (1920–2013), Yugoslav Partisan
- Tamara Bulat (1933–2004), Ukrainian-American musicologist
- Tihomir Bulat (born 1974), Croatian football player
- Tomás Bulat (1964–2015), Argentine economist and journalist
- Victor Bulat (born 1985), Moldovan football player
- Viktor Bulat (born 1971), Belarusian athlete
- Vitalie Bulat (born 1987), Moldovan football player
- Virginia C. Bulat (1938–1986), American author and historian

Notable people with the given name include:

- Bulat Abilov, Kazakh businessman and politician
- Bulat Aqchulaqov, Kazakh deputy Minister of Energy and Mineral Resources
- Bulat Iskakov, Kazakh diplomat
- Bulat Jumadilov, Kazakh boxer
- Bulat Okudzhava, Georgian "author's song" musician
- Bulat Utemuratov (born 1957), Kazakh businessman and diplomat
