= Bulatov =

Bulatov (Russian: Була́тов, masculine) or Bulatova (Russian: Булатова, feminine) is a Russian surname. Notable people with the surname include:

- Alexei Bulatov (born 1978), Russian professional ice hockey forward
- Andrei Bulatov (born 1978), Russian footballer and coach
- Dmytro Bulatov (born 1978), Ukrainian activist, Automaidan's leader
- Erik Bulatov (1933–2025), Russian artist
- Fliura Abbate-Bulatova (born 1963), Soviet and then Italian table tennis player
- Kamaliya Bulatova (born 2003), Russian chess player
- Mikhail Bulatov (1760–1825), Russian military man
- Rustem Bulatov (1974–2008)
- Sergei Bulatov (born 1972), Russian footballer and coach
- Vera Bulatova (1915–2014), Russian–born Uzbekistani archaeologist, architectural historian and museologist
- Viktor Bulatov (born 1972), Russian footballer

== See also ==
- Bulatovich
- Bulatović
- Bulat
