= Oscarsteatern =

Theatre in Stockholm, Sweden

Coordinates: 59°20′00″N 18°03′22″E

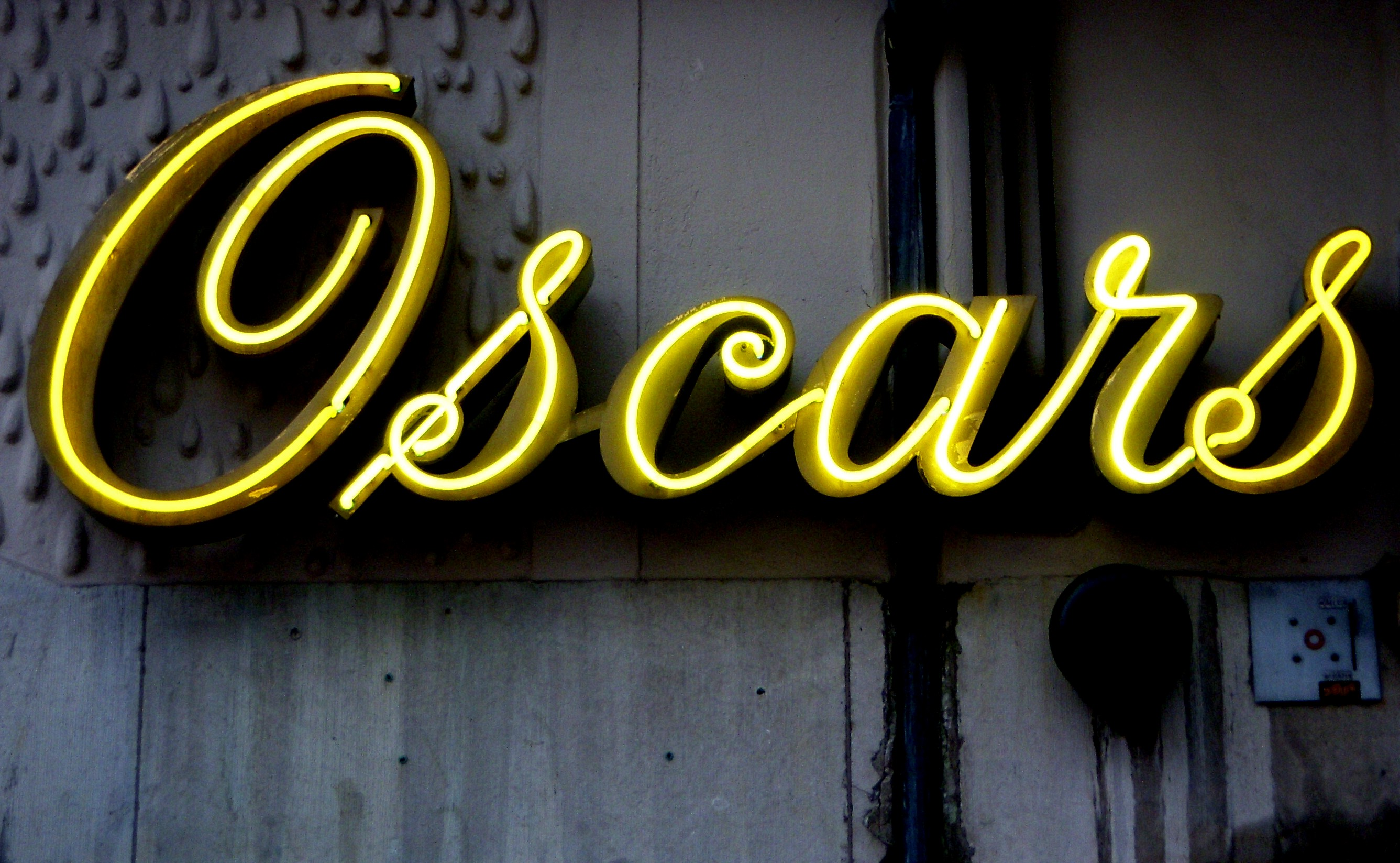
Oscarsteatern marquee sign

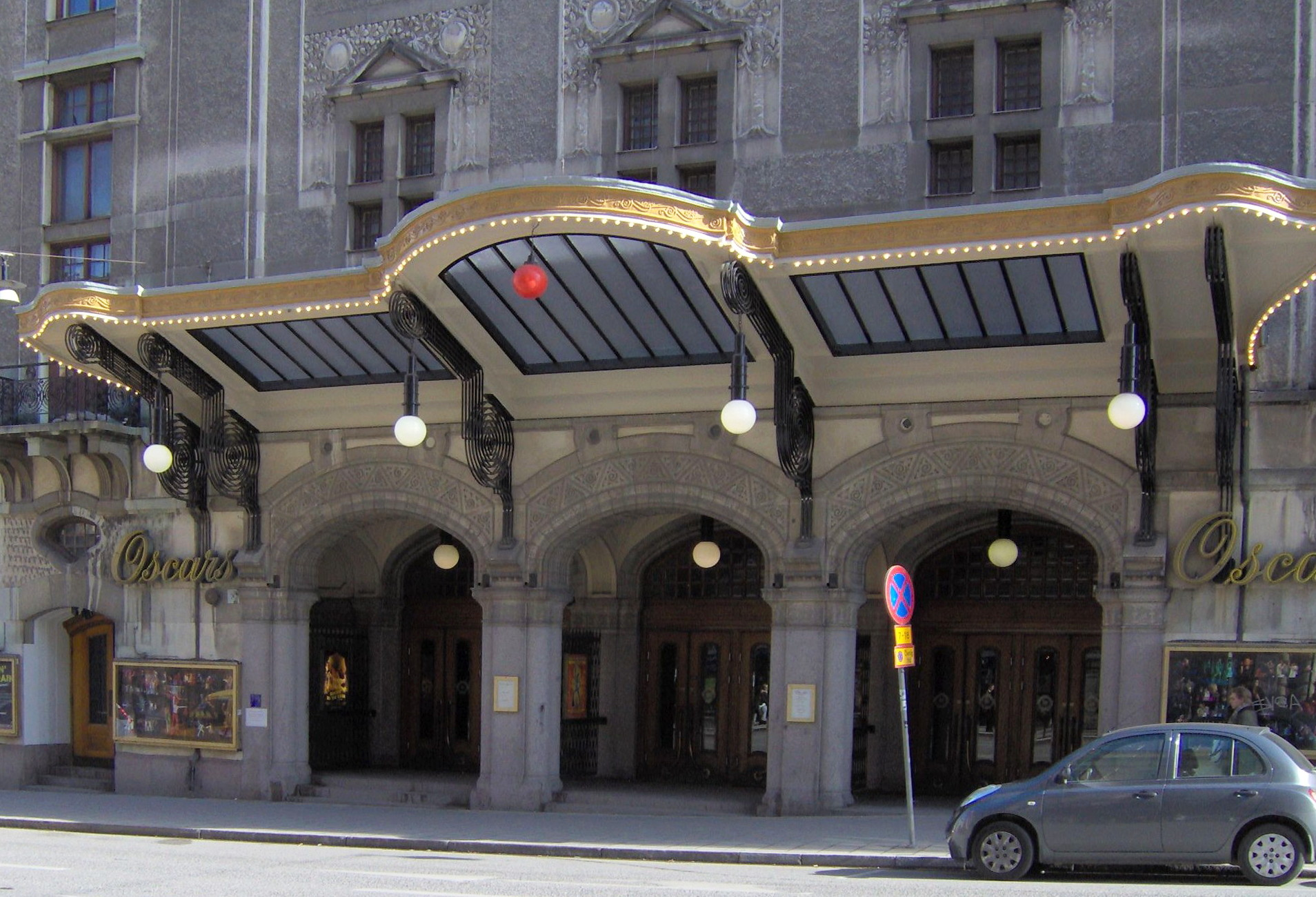
Oscarsteatern main entrance

Oscarsteatern (English: Oscar Theatre), also known simply as Oscars, is one of Stockholm's private theatres and is the best-known musical theatre in Sweden. It is located at Kungsgatan 63 in central Stockholm.

== History ==
The theater was designed in Art Nouveau by architect Axel Anderberg (1860–1937) and was inaugurated on December 6, 1906. It was named after King Oscar II. The salon accommodated 1175 seats and was decorated with white stucco and gilded ornaments. Between 1971 and 1974, the theater was closed for renovation and at the same time the salon was restored.

The opening production was Frihetsbröderna (Les brigands) by Jacques Offenbach, on 6 December the same year. The theatre has during the years been seen as the foremost stage for musical productions and operettas in Sweden. The theatre has 905 seats and for many years in the early 20th century was part of theatre empire of Albert Ranft (1858–1938).

Over the years it has boasted some great musical productions, including several successful stagings of My Fair Lady (the 1959–61 run reaching 766 performances) and the 1989–95 run of The Phantom of the Opera (performed 1173 times). Opera soprano singer Rosa Grünberg (1878–1960) made her play stage debut. The original Swedish (and European) staging of Nine in 1983 is also among the most successful – and critically acclaimed – productions in the theatre's history.

The theatre was managed from its inception until 1926 by Albert Ranft; from 1926 to 1947 by Gösta Ekman (1890–1938) and Pauline Brunius (1881–1954) among others. It was used in this period solely as a stage for spoken drama. From 1947 to 1998 it was managed by Sandrew Metronome, during a period often described as the theatre's "golden days" in terms of musical theatre shows. In 1998 it has been managed by Vicky von der Lancken and since 2004, by 2 Entertain production company.

In the autumn of 2006, the theatre celebrated its 100th jubilee with the musical production Singin' in the Rain.
