= Vicky von der Lancken =

Swedish theater director

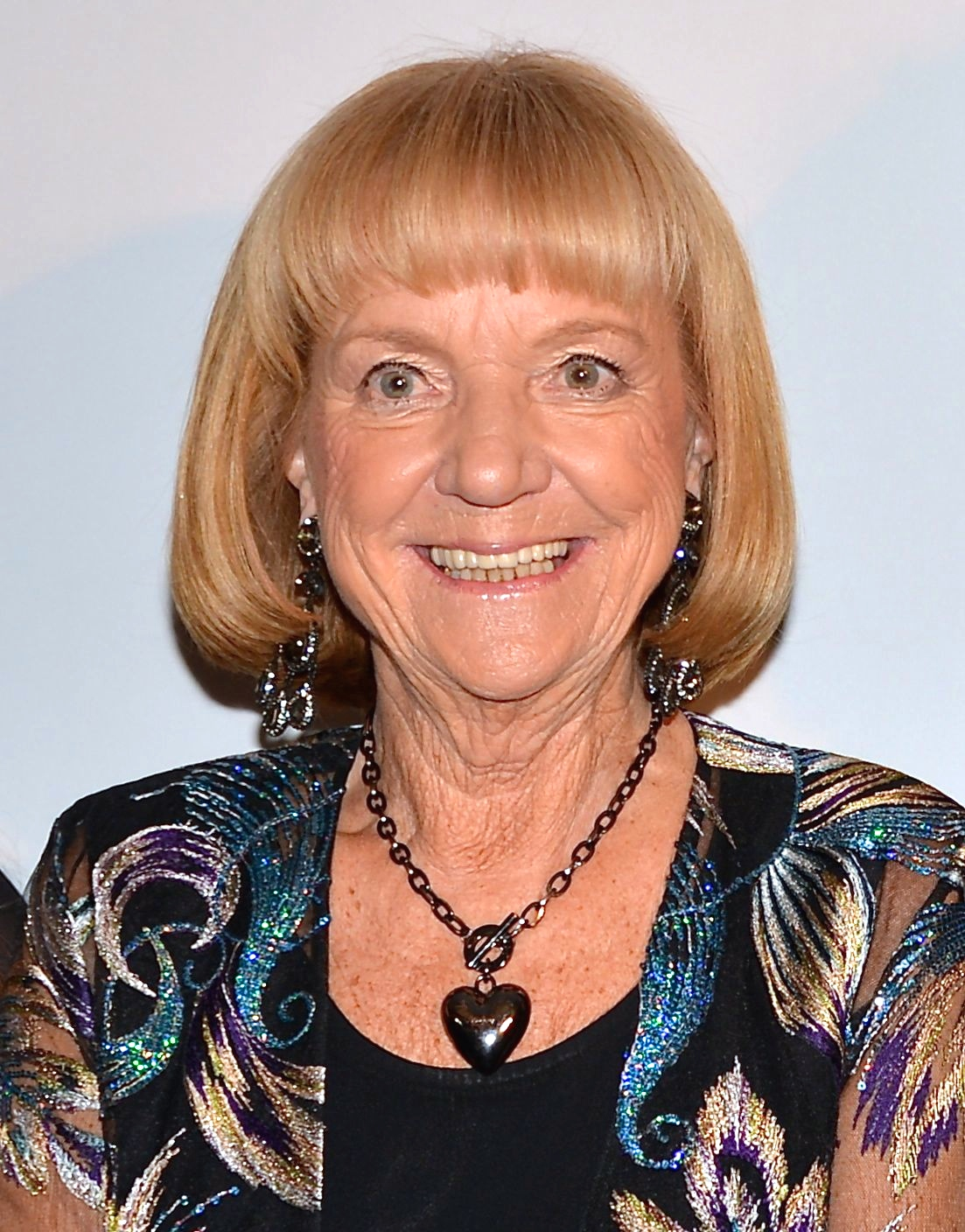
- Vicky von der Lancken in 2013
- Born: Lillemor Lindberg; 4 July 1942 (age 83); Jönköping, Sweden
- Occupation: Theater director

Vicky Lillemor Birgitta von der Lancken (born Lillemor Lindberg, 4 July 1942) is a Swedish entertainment producer and theater director.

== Career ==
Von der Lanckens career started in 1971, she became involved in the Yrkestrubadurernas förening (YTF). She has continued her career with stage productions, she worked with the production of Rhapsody in Rock, Hotelliggaren, Svensson, Svensson, Glenn Killing på Grand, Som om inget hade hänt, Maken till fruar, Lorry, Tältprojektet, Fångad på nätet, Lögn i helvete, Kvarteret Skatan at Rival in Stockholm. Since 1989, von der Lancken has concentrated her work on the musical and theater stage productions such as My Fair Lady, and the stage production of Rain Man. She owns the entertainment production company Vicky Nöjesproduktion. She is the co-owner of the Oscarsteatern in Stockholm.

On 2 February 2011, she was awarded the Smilbandetpris for her work, she was given the award by the king of Sweden, Carl XVI Gustaf. On 8 August 2011, von der Lancken presenten an episode of Sommar i P1 on Sveriges Radio where she told about her life.

On 6 March 2003, von der Lancken was sentenced to one year imprisonment for tax fraud. She served five months at an open low security prison in Sagsjön.

== Personal life ==
Von der Lancken was born in Huskvarna to a couple that soon divorced. At age 8 months, she was adopted by another couple. Her adoptive mother died from cancer around the time Vicky was 8 years old and then she grew up with a single father until he remarried when she was 15. It was her stepmother who informed Vicky that she was adopted.

She met Ernst von der Lancken in 1963 and married him in 1966, the couple divorced three years later. They had a son, Johan, whom she raised as a single mother in Rågsved, Stockholm. Johan von der Lancken is an entertainment producer currently working in his mother's business.
