= Tomás Bulat =

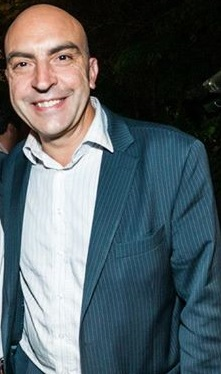
Bulat in 2013

Tomás Ariel Bulat (12 September 1964 – 31 January 2015) was an Argentine economist, journalist, writer, and professor. He was known for his report on channel A24. He wrote some books about the economy. Some of those books are La economía de tu vida, "Estamos Como Somos" and la Economía descubierta. Bulat was born in Buenos Aires.

Bulat was born in Buenos Aires, and died in Ramallo, Buenos Aires Province, after being killed in a car crash, aged 50.
