= Peter Barfuß =

German footballer

Personal information
- Full name: Peter Barfuß
- Date of birth: 11 April 1944 (age 82)
- Place of birth: Germany
- Position: Defender

Senior career*
Years	Team	Apps	(Gls)
1967	Hamburger SV	1	(0)
- * Club domestic league appearances and goals

Peter Barfuß (born 11 April 1944) is a German former footballer.

Barfuß made one appearance for Hamburger SV in the Bundesliga during his playing career.
