= Rosa Grünberg =

Swedish opera singer

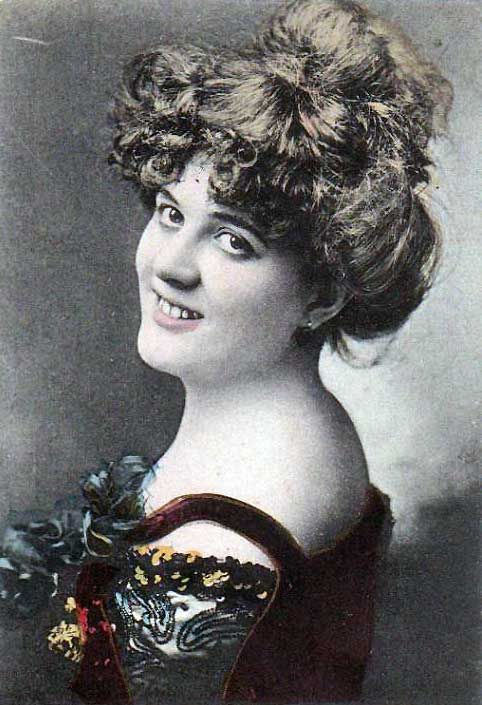
- Rosa Grünberg in 1904
- Born: Rosalie Grünberg; 4 January 1878; Stockholm, Sweden
- Died: 11 April 1960 (aged 82)
- Occupations: Actress; Operatic soprano

Rosalie "Rosa" Grünberg (4 January 1878 – 11 April 1960) was a Swedish actress and opera soprano singer. She was considered one of the Swedish opera scene's prima donnas.

== Biography ==
The Stockholm-born Grünberg was one of the noted prima donnas of the Swedish opera scene in the beginning of the 1900s. She made her play stage debut in 1898 in Bröllopet på Ulvåsa at the Svenska Teatern.

Later, she worked in that venue and other theaters owned by Albert Ranft until 1915. Amongst her performances was a role in the play Frihetsbröderna, which was the opening show for the Oscarsteatern at its launch in 1906.

She made her opera stage debut in Tosca in 1914 at the Royal Swedish Opera in Stockholm. She also had operatic roles as Mimosa San in Geishan, as Rosalinda in Läderlappen, and as Angèle in Greven av Luxemburg. She occasionally sang more popular songs and also wrote the lyrics for Karl Lundin's composition Spiskroksvalsen.

She recorded songs for recording labels. During the years 1908 and 1911, she appeared in two short films. When Crown Princess Margareta visited Britain, there were rumours in Sweden that Crown Prince Gustaf VI Adolf had a secret relationship with Grünberg.

She left the performing stage for good in 1918 and wed Bror Yngve Sjöstedt, a professor in entomology at the Naturhistoriska riksmuseet.

== Filmography ==
- 1908 – Amerikaminnen
- 1909 – Skilda tiders danser
