= Tekena Tamuno =

Nigerian academic (1932–2015)

- Born: 28 January 1932; Okrika, Port Harcourt, British Nigeria
- Died: 11 April 2015 (aged 83); Ibadan, Nigeria
- Occupation: Historian
- Known for: Historiography of Africa

Academic background
- Education: University of London

Tekena Nitonye Tamuno (28 January 1932 – 11 April 2015) was a Nigerian historian and Vice-chancellor of the University of Ibadan. He was the President of the Board of Trustees of Bells University of Technology.

== Education and career ==
Tamuno attended St Peter's School in his hometown of Okrika for primary education. Upon completion he attended Okrika Grammar School. From 1953 to 1958 he studied history at the University of Ibadan before leaving the country in 1960 to continue his studies at Birkbeck, University of London and Columbia University. In 1962 he joined the Department of History at the University of Ibadan where he remains as professor emeritus.

In addition to his administrative and teaching career, he is an author and has chaired public service commissions.

Tamuno died on 11 April 2015 in Ibadan, aged 83.

== University of Ibadan timeline ==
- Lecturer, 1963
- Senior Lecturer, 1967
- Professor, 1971
- Head, department of History, 1972–1975
- Dean, Faculty of Arts, 1973–1975
- Vice Chancellor, 1975–1979.

== Selected books ==
- Nigeria and Elective Representation, 1923–1947.Heinemann (1966)
- The evolution of the Nigerian state: The Southern phase, 1898–1914. Humanities Press, 1972. ISBN 0-391-00232-5
- Abebe: Portrait of a Nigerian leader. ALF Publications, 1991. ISBN 978-31191-7-6
- Herbert Macaulay, Nigerian patriot. Heinemann Educational, 1975. ISBN 0-435-94472-X
- Nigeria: Its people and its problems. ISBN 978-31069-1-0
- Nigerian universities, their students and their society: Factors of leadership, time, and circumstance. ISBN 978-31069-0-2
- The police in modern Nigeria, 1861–1965: Origins, development, and role.
- Nigeria Since Independence. Heinemann Educational Books. ISBN 978-129-481-7
- Nigerian federalism in historical perspective. Federalism and Political Restructuring in Nigeria. Ibadan: Spectrum.

== See also ==
- List of vice chancellors in Nigeria
