= Edward Lawson (VC) =

English recipient of the Victoria Cross (1873–1955)

- Born: 11 April 1873; Newcastle upon Tyne, England
- Died: 2 July 1955 (aged 82); Walker, Northumberland
- Burial place: Heaton Cemetery, Newcastle upon Tyne
- Military career
- Allegiance: United Kingdom
- Branch: British Army
- Rank: Sergeant
- Units: Gordon Highlanders
- Conflicts: Tirah Campaign; Chitral Expedition; Second Boer War; World War I
- Awards: Victoria Cross

Edward Lawson VC (11 April 1873 – 2 July 1955) was an English recipient of the Victoria Cross, the highest and most prestigious award for gallantry in the face of the enemy that can be awarded to British and Commonwealth forces.

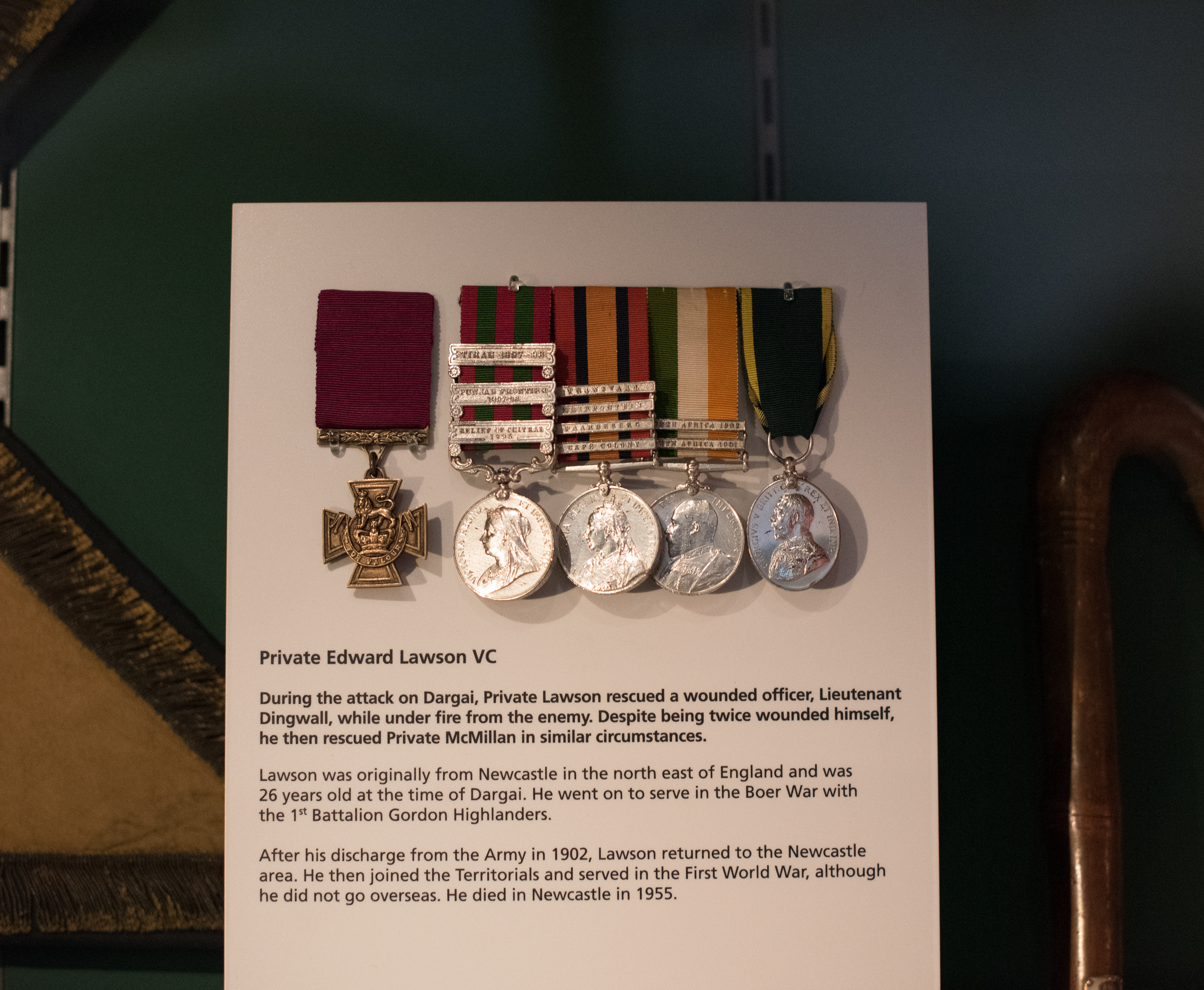
Lawson's Victoria Cross displayed at the Gordon Highlanders Museum.

He was a private in the 1st Battalion, The Gordon Highlanders, British Army during the Tirah Campaign when the following deed took place on 20 October 1897 on the Dargai Heights, for which he was awarded the VC:

The Gordon Highlanders. Private E. Lawson. During the attack on the Dargai Heights on the 20th October, 1897, Private Lawson carried Lieutenant K. Dingwall, the Gordon Highlanders (who was wounded and unable to move), out of a heavy fire, and subsequently returned and brought in Private McMillan, being himself wounded in two places.

Private Lawson continued to serve with his regiment until 1902. He had a further period of military service serving as a sergeant in the Northern Cyclist Battalion before and during the First World War. His Victoria Cross is displayed at the Gordon Highlanders Museum in Aberdeen, Scotland.

There are two memorials to Edward Lawson in Newcastle upon Tyne. The first is a bench dedicated to him in Old Eldon Square by the war memorial. The second is a memorial to Newcastle's Victoria Cross recipients outside the Discovery Museum in the city's west end.

Sometime after The First World War, Edward Lawson lived with his family in Parson's Avenue, Walker, Newcastle upon Tyne, having moved from the Heaton area of Newcastle upon Tyne. He died on 2 July 1955.

== Honours ==
Ribbon	Description	Notes
	Victoria Cross (VC)	1897
	India Medal	Clasps: Tirah 1897-98, Punjab Frontier 1897-98 and Relief of Chitral 1895.
	Queen's South Africa Medal	Clasps: Transvaal, Driefontein, Paardeberg and Cape Colony
	King's South Africa Medal	Clasps: South Africa 1901 and South Africa 1902
	Territorial Efficiency Medal	
