= Nedeljko Bulatović =

Serbian footballer (1939–2023)

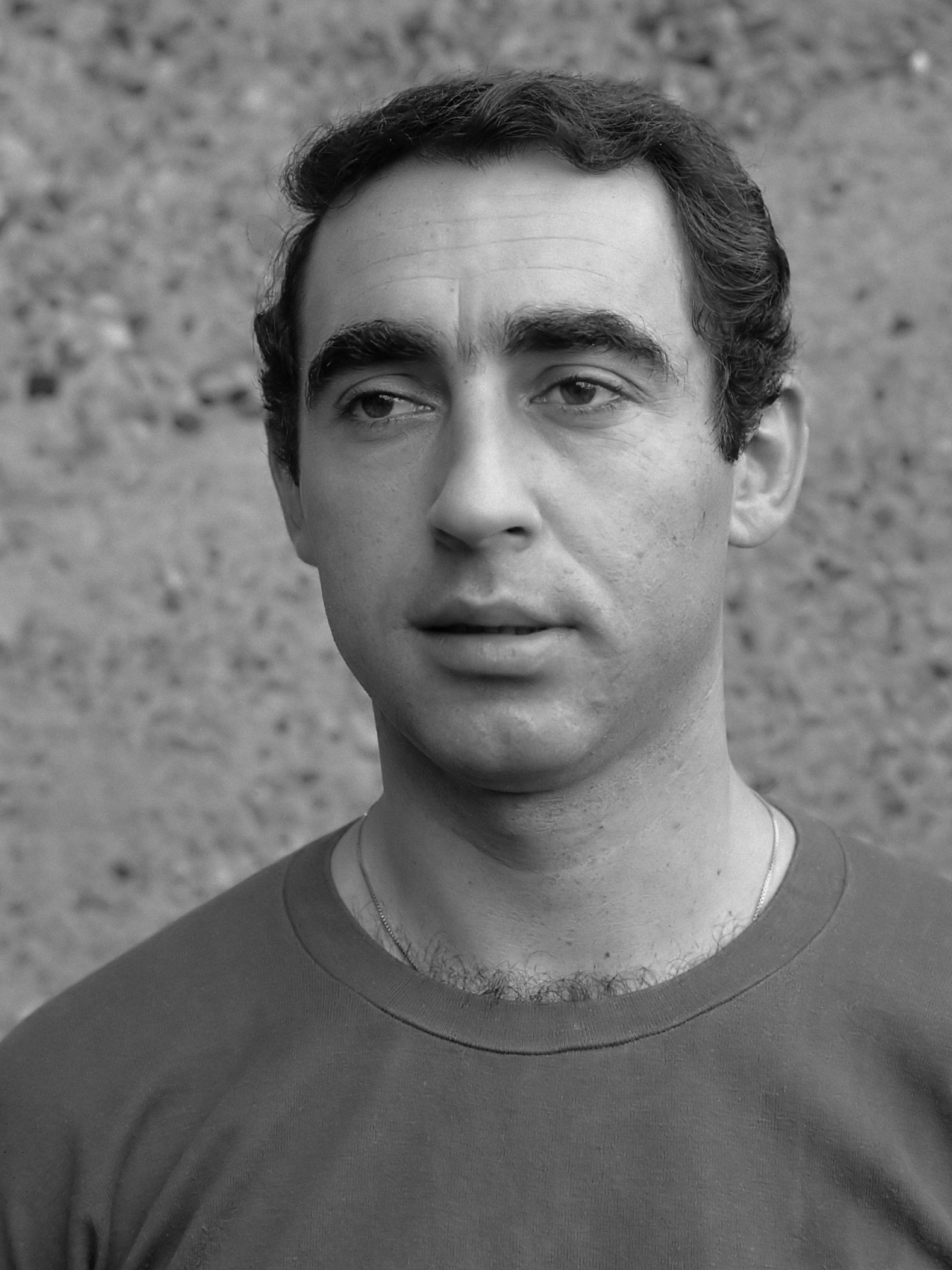
- Bulatović in 1966

Personal information
- Date of birth: 19 April 1939
- Place of birth: Peć, Yugoslavia (now Kosovo)
- Date of death: 11 May 2023 (aged 84)
- Place of death: Hasselt, Belgium
- Position: Midfielder

Senior career*
Years	Team	Apps	(Gls)
1957–1963	Vojvodina		
1963	SSC Yugal		
1963–1964	Austria Klagenfurt		
1964–1965	Enschedese Boys	27	(8)
1965–1966	Twente	12	(0)
1966–1967	→ NEC	30	(4)
1967–1968	Sittardia	9	(0)
1968–1969	Fortuna Sittard	21	(1)
1970	Sydney Croatia		
1971–1973	Tongeren	30	(1)

Managerial career
- 1971–1973: Tongeren
- 1973–1974: Standard Liège
- 1974–1975: Vitesse Arnhem
- 1979–1981: Mechelen
- 1982–1984: Oostende
- 1984–1986: Winterslag
- 1986–1987: Gabon
- 1988: Eendracht Aalst
- 1989–1990: Sint-Niklase
- * Club domestic league appearances and goals

Nedeljko "Ned" Bulatović (19 April 1939 – 11 May 2023) was a Serbian football player and manager.

== Playing career ==
Bulatović played as a midfielder for Vojvodina, Enschedese Boys, Twente, NEC, Sittardia and Fortuna SC.

Raised in Novi Sad, he played in newly-formed FC Twente's first ever match against SC Telstar in 1965, and provided the club's first ever assist in a 1–1 draw. He later also became the first player to score for the then newly established Fortuna Sittard, in a pre-season friendly in July 1968.

== Coaching career ==
Bulatović managed Tongeren, Standard de Liège, Vitesse Arnhem, KV Mechelen, K.V. Oostende, the Gabon national team and various other Belgian clubs.
