= Vera Bulatova =

Russian-Uzbek archaeologist (1915–2014)

- Born: 30 September 1915; Moscow, Russian Empire
- Died: 11 December 2014 (aged 99); Tashkent, Uzbekistan

Vera Andreyevna Bulatova (Russian: Вера Андреевна Булатова; September 30, 1915 in Moscow – December 11, 2014 in Tashkent) was a Russian–born Uzbekistani archaeologist, architectural historian and museologist. She authored over thirty works in her lifetime on the archaeology and history of Central Asia.

== Research Interests ==
Bulatova has published on the architectural history of Tashkent, Uzbekistan. Between 1937 and 1938 she was well known for her research on Samarkand. In 1940, she moved to the National University of Uzbekistan. She studied landscapes of Turkmenistan under Galina Pugachenkova. She excavated widely in the area including Old and New Nisa, Anau, Pestak (Abiverd) and several monuments in the Amu Darya Valley. In 1948 Bulatova excavated the ancient settlements Pestak, Khiveabad in the Kaakhkinsky district the study of old “kala” (fortified Bayaandn manors) was continued in the village of Bagi.

From 1950 to 1957, Bulatova worked as a researcher at the Special Scientific Restoration Workshops under the Office of Architecture of the Ministry of Culture of the Uzbek SSR and studied the history of the composition of medieval architectural monuments of Khiva, Bukhara, Samarkand, Shakhrisabz, Termez and Tashkent. She carried out the first archaeological excavations of the medieval arch of Ichan-Kala, the mausoleums of Alautdin-bobo, Uch-avliya, and examined monuments in the Khorezm region.

From 1957 to 1975, Bulatova worked as a senior researcher at the Institute of History and Archeology of the Academy of Sciences of Uzbekistan. She excavated part of the village of Kyzylkir in the Bukhara region as part of an expedition led by Yahya Gulyamova. She explored the early medieval settlement of Kuva and its environs in the Ferghana Valley. As part of the Uzbek archaeological expedition, the Academy of Sciences of the Uzbek SSR conducted field work from 1956 to 1959, together with Kh. Mukhamedov at the northwest tower of the Kuva citadel. From 1959 to 1969, she led archaeological research on a small hill north of the main city of Kuva with a residential quarter of the 7th century.

In 1967 following the strong earthquake of 1966 and the subsequent restoration of Tashkent, the Tashkent archaeological detachment was created for archaeological monitoring of urban new buildings under her leadership. In the first years, the boundaries of the Binkat settlement, which was hidden under the Old Town buildings, were outlined. The research team covered almost all archaeological sites in Tashkent. Among them is Kazakhmazartepa on the territory of the modern 13th quarter of the Tashkent massif Chilanzar.

Bulatova retired in 1975.

== Personal life ==
Bulatova was born in Moscow in 1915. She graduated from technical college in 1934 and worked in the Planning Department of Moscow City Council. In 1935 she married Mithat Bulatov(1907—2004), who is architect, architectural historian, doctor of architecture (1975). She died on December 11, 2014, in Tashkent.
