= Rade Bulatović =

Serbian former intelligence officer

Rade Bulatović (Serbian Cyrillic: Раде Булатовић, born 19 March 1958) was the head of the Serbian Security and Information Agency between March 2004 and July 2008.

== Career ==
Rade Bulatović worked in the Belgrade municipality of Savski venac in the late 1980s, and that before the collapse of the former Yugoslavia he was employed in the Federal Secretariat for Foreign Affairs (later the Federal Ministry for Foreign Affairs). He served in the consulates in Istanbul and Rome, and colleagues who served with him claim that even then he had excellent relations with the police. "Rade managed to get answers from the MUP in just a few days to requests that the rest of us had been waiting for for months," says one of his former superiors. An affair involving the theft of a purse with around fifty thousand dollars from a car in which, in addition to the chauffeur and the accountant, Bulatović was also connected to his service in Rome. All were sent back to Belgrade, but no one was held accountable for the missing money. He was dismissed from SMIP after the October 5th changes as part of the old staff.

== Affairs ==
From November 2000 to March 2003, Rade was Vojislav Koštunica's national security advisor in the presidential cabinet. That period was marked by three affairs and one arrest.

=== Affair Gavrilović ===
Former State Security operative Momir Gavrilović was killed on August 3, 2001, in the parking lot on John Kennedy Street in New Belgrade, not long after the conversation with Rade Bulatović and fellow advisor Gradimir Nalić. Koštunica then stated that Gavrilović in his office, on the day he was killed, talked with his associates about the penetration of organized crime into economic life, about the strength and ramifications of the activities of certain clans and corruption. In January of this year, the District Prosecutor's Office announced that it was conducting an investigation against Dragan Nikolić Teča and Ljubiša Buha Čume due to Gavrilović's murder.

=== Affair Perišić ===
Spectacular arrest of the former Chief of the General Staff and Deputy Prime Minister of the Government of Serbia, Momcilo Perišić, in the restaurant of the "Šarić" motel, on March 15, 2002. General Nebojša Pavković, then Chief of the General Staff, later claimed that Bulatović independently coordinated the arrest, bypassing official military channels. In the NIN weekly, Bulatović himself assessed the arrest of Perišić as "the success of the country's unique security system."

=== Affair "four-wire cable" ===
Rade Bulatović, along with fellow adviser Gradimir Nalić and Kostunica's chief of staff Ljiljana Nedeljković, was accused of being the initiator of the attempt to use special units of the Yugoslav Army to break into the Communications Bureau of the Government of Serbia in June 2002 due to the alleged wiretapping of Kostunica from that bureau. The case has never been fully clarified, although an inquiry committee was formed in the Serbian Parliament for that purpose.

=== Arrest ===
During Operation Saber, after the murder of Zoran Đinđić, Rade Bulatović and the head of the VJ Security Administration, Aca Tomić, were arrested on the basis of Article 122 and in connection with Article 125 of the CPC (association for hostile activities). At the time, the Serbian government claimed that Aca Tomić and Bulatović met secretly with Dušan Spasojević and Milorad Luković Legija, and that they were part of a conspiracy to kill Đinđić. Bulatović was released after less than three months, and the charges against him were dropped.
