= Percy Lane Oliver =

Pioneer of volunteer blood donation

- Born: 11 April 1878; St Ives, Cornwall, England
- Died: 16 April 1944 (aged 66); St George's Hospital, Westminster, London, England
- Occupation: Civil Servant
- Known for: Pioneer of volunteer blood donation

Percy Lane Oliver OBE (11 April 1878 – 16 April 1944) was a British civil servant, who is credited with founding the first volunteer blood donation service. A layman, Oliver was working for the Camberwell division of the Red Cross in 1921 when he responded to a call from a local hospital requesting an urgent blood donation. This experience led him to organise a panel of donors whose blood types were known and who were available to donate on request. The donors, unusually for the time, were not paid. Oliver's blood donation service, which he ran out of his London home, would grow from 20 volunteers at its inception to approximately 2700 in 1938. His model of voluntary blood donation was adopted throughout Britain and in other countries.

== Early life ==
Oliver, the son of two teachers, was born in St Ives, Cornwall on 11 April 1878. His family moved to London five years later. At 14, he applied to join the Civil Service, but despite placing first in the exam, he was denied admission on the basis of his "weak heart". He then worked as a librarian for the Camberwell Borough Council and in 1901 took up a position with the Camberwell Town Hall. He married Ethel Grace in 1905 and would go on to have three children with her.

== Career ==
Oliver was one of the founding members of the Camberwell Red Cross division, and in 1910 was named its honorary secretary. During the First World War, the organisation helped rescue explosion victims. Oliver and Ethel also aided in rehoming war refugees, and in 1918, the couple were appointed to the Order of the British Empire.

While Oliver had recognised the need for an organised network of blood donors as early as 1920, the beginnings of his transfusion service are generally dated to 1921. In October of that year, the Red Cross received a call from King's College Hospital in nearby Denmark Hill for an emergency blood transfusion. Oliver, along with three of his colleagues, volunteered to donate blood; one person's blood type was compatible with the patient's, and the transfusion was successful. This inspired Oliver to establish a panel of individuals with known blood types who were available to donate upon request. The panel, which initially consisted of 20 of Oliver's colleagues and operated out of his home, grew to encompass 450 donors by 1926. As demand for blood increased, many London Rover Scouts were enlisted as donors.

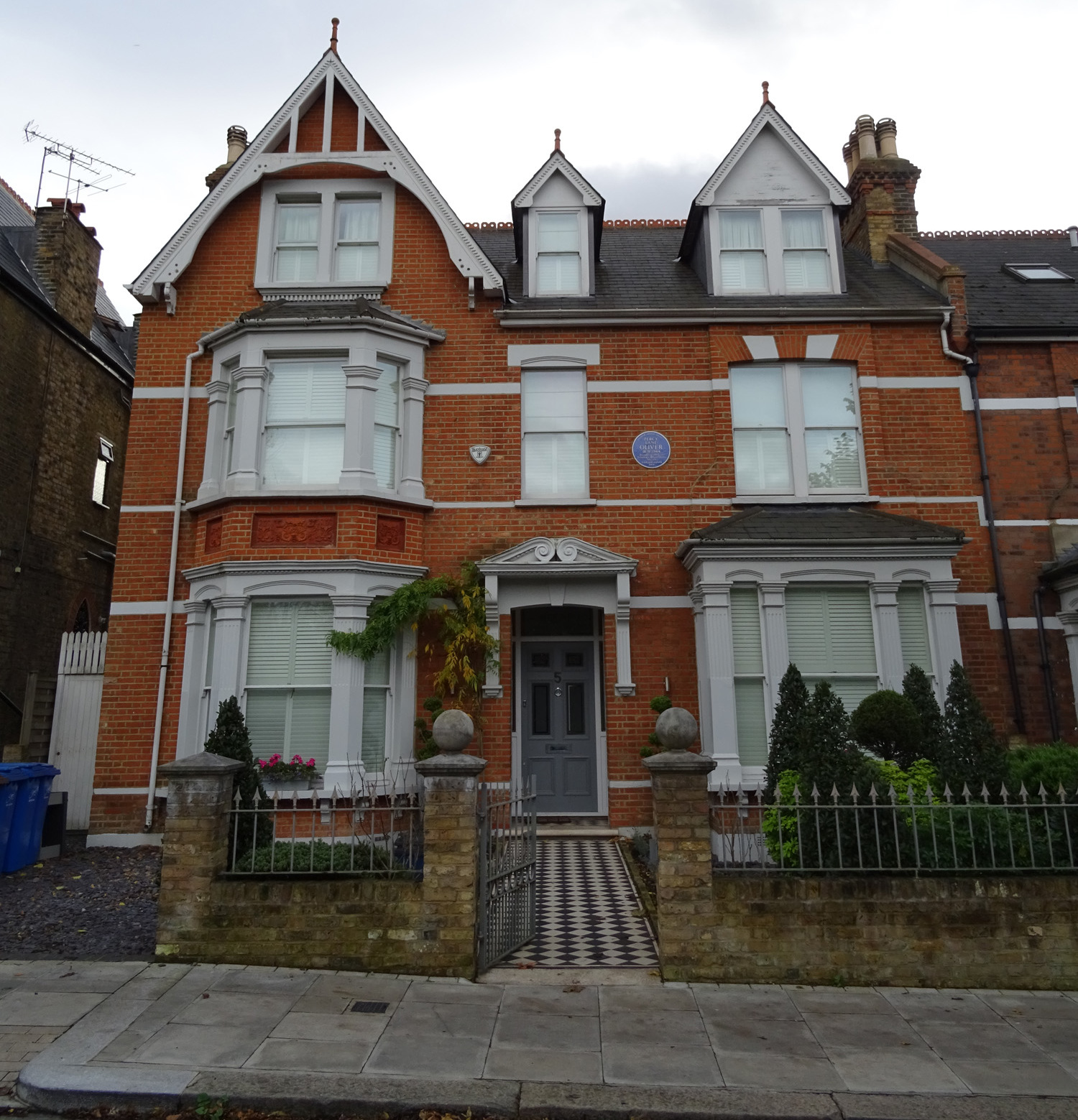
Oliver's former home at 5 Colyton Road, as of 2015

Internal struggles led Oliver to resign from his position with the Camberwell Red Cross at the end of 1925. The Camberwell transfusion service—which had previously been operating unofficially—was incorporated as the British Red Cross Blood Transfusion Service in 1926. Geoffrey Keynes was appointed as the organisation's medical advisor. The transfusion service continued to operate out of Oliver's home; in 1928 its demands led the family to move to a larger property at 5 Colyton Road, Peckham Rye, London.

Prospective donors underwent physical health screening and testing for syphilis, and—contrary to the practices of the time in the United States and much of England—were not paid. While paid donations carried a reputation of attracting a sometimes unsavoury clientele, Oliver emphasised that his donors were "drawn from all classes of the community – independent and professional men and women, barristers, journalists, shopmen and girls, labourers, apprentices, roadmen, maid servants and charwomen".

The removal of payment from the equation also encouraged Oliver to institute more humane practices for the treatment of donors. The Red Cross Blood Transfusion Service banned the common, but painful and dangerous technique of "cutting down"—making a large incision in the arm to access the vein—and required that the donor be lying down during the blood collection. Oliver eschewed the perception of blood donors as heroes subjecting themselves to a dangerous ordeal, and forbade contact between donors and patients, as he believed that "every donor should realise that he or she is a unit of an organisation created and functioning for the benefit of humanity generally, at the direction of surgeons, and not at the behest of a single individual". In 1932, the Red Cross Blood Transfusion Service founded the Voluntary Blood Donors Association, which provided insurance for its donors, organised social events and published a newsletter. By 1938, the service counted approximately 2700 donors among its ranks.

Despite his lay origins, Oliver gained recognition as an authority on transfusion, and his system of voluntary blood donation was adopted throughout Britain and in other countries. During the Second World War he was involved in the creation of a service for emergency blood transfusions, which, after the war (and Oliver's death), developed into a government-run national transfusion service.

== Death and legacy ==
Oliver died of a heart attack at St George's Hospital, Westminster on 16 April 1944. The Oliver Memorial Fund, established upon his death, granted the Oliver Memorial Award to individuals—including laypeople—who have contributed to the field of transfusion medicine. The Royal College of Pathologists also issues an "Oliver Memorial Trainee Bursary" each year since 1948.

English Heritage commemorated Oliver's former home at 5 Colyton Road with a plaque in 1979.

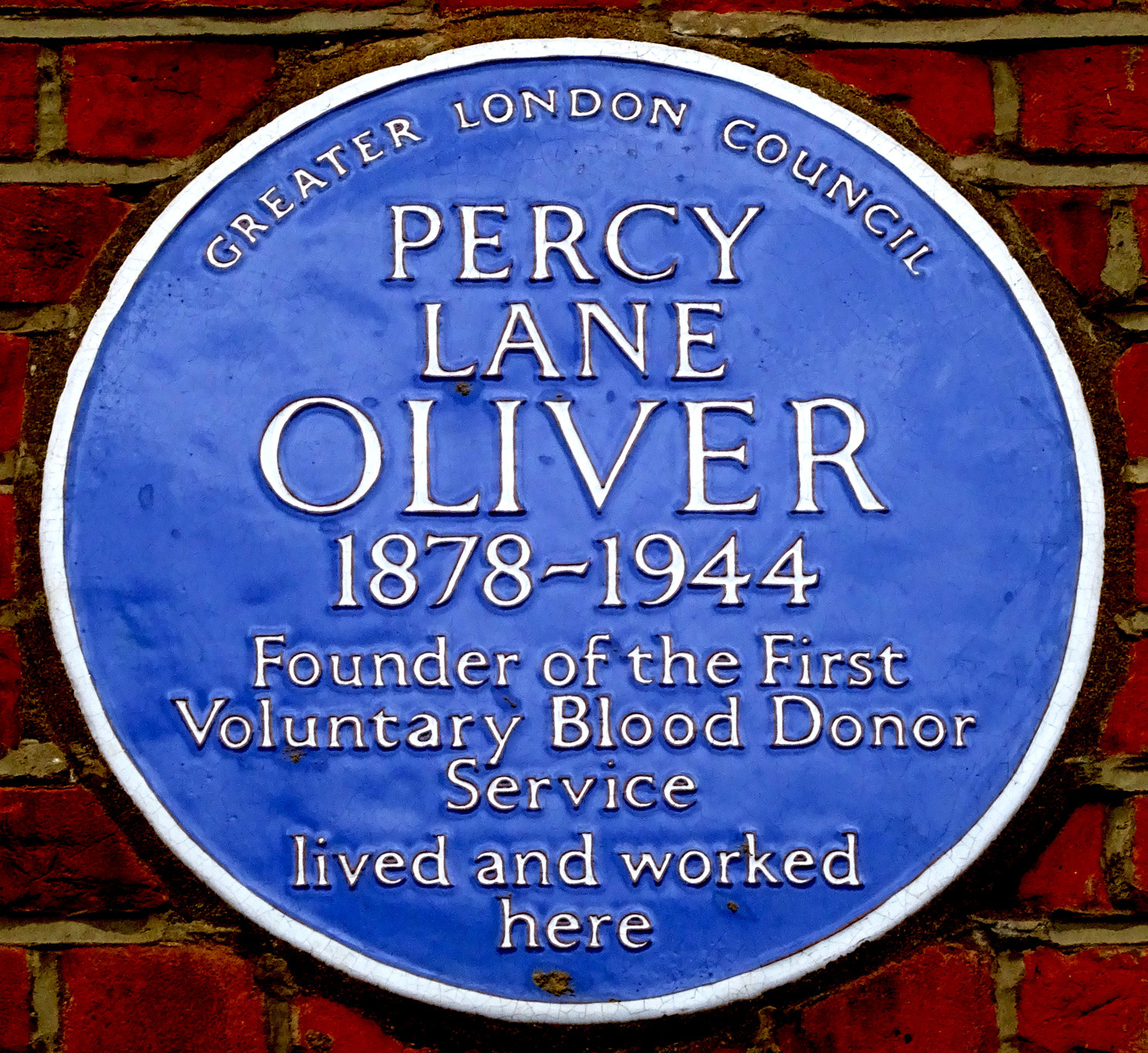
Blue plaque erected in 1979 by Greater London Council at 5 Colyton Road, Peckham Rye, Southwark
