= Lev Bulat =

Russian physicist

- Лев Петрович Булат
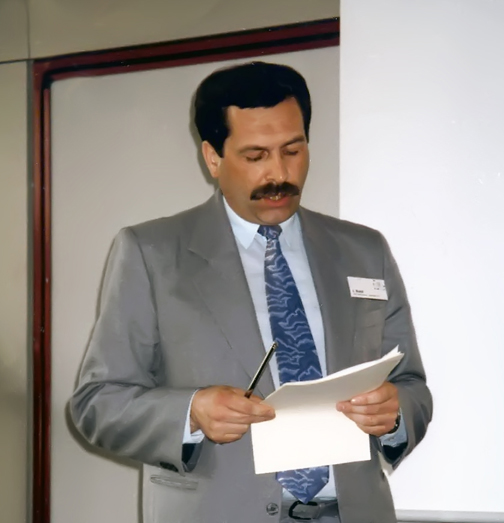
- Bulat in 2008
- Born: April 11, 1947; Chernovtsy, Ukraine
- Died: June 12, 2016 (aged 69)
- Education: Leningrad Polytechnical Institute (PhD)
- Occupation: Physicist

Lev Petrovich Bulat (Russian: Лев Петрович Булат; 1947–2016) was a Russian physicist.

Bulat was born on April 11, 1947 in Chernovtsy, Ukraine. In 1988, he received a D.Sc in physics and mathematics from Leningrad Polytechnical Institute, with his thesis entitled "Transport Phenomena in Semiconductors under Large Temperature Gradients".

He was an expert in transport properties of semiconductors, physics of nanostructures, thermoelectric phenomena, direct energy conversion, and thermoelectric cooling. He was a professor of electrical and electronic engineering at Saint Petersburg State University.

He died suddenly on June 12, 2016 at age 69, less than two weeks after attending an international conference.

== Awards and grants ==
- 2009. A diploma of the International Thermoelectric Academy, Kiev, Ukraine.
- 2009. A grant from the EERSS Program, Singapore.
- 2008. A grant from the Russian Federal Agency on Sciences and Innovation.
- 2007. A grant from the EERSS Program, Singapore.
- 2006. The Certificate of Honor from the Ministry of Education and Science, Russian Federation.
- 1996–2009. Eleven grants from the Russian Foundation for Basic Research.
- 2005. A grant from SSHN, France.
- 2004, 2007. Two grants from CONACYT, Mexico.
- 2003–2004. A grant from the Ministry of Education, Russian Federation.
- 1997. A grant from KOSEF, Korea.
- 1997. A grant from the MacArthur Foundation, USA.
- 1997–2000. Holder of a personal grant from the Russian Academy of Sciences as an outstanding scientist.
- 1997. Two grants from the Materials Research Society, USA.
- 1993–1994. Three grants from the International Science Foundation, USA.

== Organizations ==
- 2004. Member of the Board of the International Thermoelectric Academy.
- 2003. Member of the Board of the International Academy of Refrigeration.
- 2002. Active member of the International Thermoelectric Academy. https://web.archive.org/web/20021204093057/http://www.ite.cv.ua/ita/index.html
- 1999. Honorary member of the International Biographical Center's Advisory Council, Cambridge, England. http://www.melrosepress.co.uk/index.html
- 1998. Member of the Euroscience Society, France. https://web.archive.org/web/20080115202436/http://www.euroscience.org/index.html
- 1997. Member of the Branch on Thermoelectric Energy Conversion of the Science Council for the Problem of "Direct Energy Conversion", Russian Academy of Sciences.
- 1997. Active member of the International Academy of Refrigeration. http://www.maxiar.spb.ru/conf.shtml
- 1996. Head of the Section for Alternative Methods of Refrigeration of the International Academy of Refrigeration. https://web.archive.org/web/20071013151654/http://zts.com/iar
- 1996. Member of the Board of the Russian Thermoelectric Society.
- 1991. Member of the Materials Research Society, USA.
- 1990. Member of the International Thermoelectric Society.
- 1989. Member of the Branch on Thermoelectric Materials Research of the Science Council on the Problem of "Solid State Physics", Ukrainian Academy of Sciences.
- 1982. Member of the Branch on Thermoelectric and Photoelectric Energy Conversion of the Science Council on the Problem of "Methods of Direct Energy Conversion", Ukrainian Academy of Sciences.

== Publications ==
Bulat was the author of 9 books, 200 scientific papers and 5 patents.

=== Books ===
1. Bulat L.P., Yang Y.S. Thermoelectric Energy Conversion with Application to Solar Energy. Seoul, Jungin I&D Co., Ltd, Korea, 2006, 80 p.

2. Afanasyeva N.A., Bulat L.P. Electrical and electronic engineering. St. Petersburg State University of Refrigeration and Food Engineering: 2006, St. Petersburg, Russia, 185 p.

3. Timofeevskiy L.S., Bulat L.P. et al. Heat and design calculation of refrigeration machines, heat pumps and heat-transformers. Part 1. Calculation of cycles, thermodynamic and thermal properties of working substances. SPbUR&FE: 2006, St. Petersburg Russia, 456 p.

4. Thermoelectric Refrigeration. Bulat L.P., Vedernikov M.V., Vyalov A.P. et al. Ed. by L.P.Bulat. St. Petersburg State University of Refrigeration and Food Engineering: 2002, St. Petersburg, Russia, 147 p.

5. Bulat L.P., Buzin E.V. Thermoelectric cooling systems. St. Petersburg State University of Refrigeration and Food Engineering: 2001, St. Petersburg, Russia, 42 p.

6. Anatychuk L.I. and Bulat L.P. Semiconductors under extreme temperature conditions. “Nauka”, St. Petersburg, 2001, Russia, 224 p.

7. Bulat L.P. Transport Phenomena in Semiconductors under Large Temperature Gradients. LPI, Leningrad, 1987, 300 p.

8. Bulat L.P. and Tomchuk P.M. Solution of kinetic equation under condition of strong heterogeneity. Kiev, Institute of Physics, 1987.

9. Bulat L.P., Demchishin E.I., Snarsky A.A. and Tomchuk P.M. Non-linear effective kinetic coefficients in heterogeneous media. Kiev, Institute of Physics, 1984.

=== Patents ===
- Bulat L.P. et al. The Bearing Unit // Patent # SU 1765567. Priority from 08.02.89. Published 30.09.92. USSR.
- Anatychuk L.I., Bulat L.P. and Jatsjuk V.G. Thermoelement // Patent # SU 1630577. Priority from 20.01.88. USSR.
- Bulat L.P. and Gutsal D.D. The Linear Motor // Patent # SU 1394348. Priority from 23.07.85. Published 07.05.88. USSR.
- Bulat L.P. and Demchishin E.I. The Method of Generating Transverse Thermoelectric Power in Single Crystals of High Symmetry // Patent # SU 1484215. Priority from 12.01.87. USSR.
- Bulat L.P. and Gutsal D.D. The Heat Flux Sensor // Patent # SU 1545103. Priority from 10.11.87. Published 23.02.90. USSR.
