= Dominant-party system =

Continuous dominance of a single political party in elections

A dominant-party system, or a one-party dominant system, is a political occurrence in which a single political party continuously dominates election results, overrunning opposition groups or parties. Any ruling party staying in power for more than one consecutive term may be considered a dominant party (also referred to as a predominant or hegemonic party). Some dominant parties were called the natural governing party, given their length of time in power.

Dominant parties, and their domination of a state, develop out of one-sided electoral and party constellations within a multi-party system (particularly under presidential systems of governance), and as such differ from states under a one-party system, which are intricately organized around a specific party. Sometimes the term "de facto one-party state" is used to describe dominant-party systems which, unlike a one-party system, allows (at least nominally) democratic multiparty elections, but the existing practices or balance of political power effectively prevent the opposition from winning power, thus resembling a one-party state. Dominant-party systems differ from the political dynamics of other dominant multi-party constellations such as consociationalism, grand coalitions and two-party systems, which are characterized and sustained by narrow or balanced competition and cooperation.

In political literature, more than 130 dominant party systems between 1950 and 2017 were included in a list by A. A. Ostroverkhov. For example, in the post-Soviet states, researchers classify parties such as United Russia and Amanat (Kazakhstan) as dominant parties on the basis that these parties have long held the majority of seats in parliament (although they do not directly form the government or appoint officials to government positions). In Russian political science literature, such associations are often called "parties of power".

It is believed that a system with a dominant party can be either authoritarian or democratic. However, since there is no consensus in the global political science community on a set of mandatory features of democracy (for example, there is a point of view according to which the absence of alternation of power is, in principle, incompatible with democratic norms), it is difficult to separate the two types of one-party dominance.

== Theory ==
Dominant-party systems are commonly based on majority rule for proportional representation or majority boosting in semi-proportional representation. Plurality voting systems can result in large majorities for a party with a lower percentage of the vote than in proportional representation systems due to a fractured opposition (resulting in wasted votes and a lower number of parties entering the legislature) and gerrymandering.

Critics of the "dominant party" theory argue that it views the meaning of democracy as given, and that it assumes that only a particular conception of representative democracy (in which different parties alternate frequently in power) is valid. Raymond Suttner, himself a former leader in the African National Congress (ANC), argues that "the dominant party 'system' is deeply flawed as a mode of analysis and lacks explanatory capacity. But it is also a very conservative approach to politics. Its fundamental political assumptions are restricted to one form of democracy, namely electoral politics, and display hostility towards popular politics. This is manifest in the obsession with the quality of electoral opposition, and its sidelining or ignoring of popular political activity organised in other ways. The assumption in this approach is that other forms of organisation and opposition are of limited importance or a separate matter from the consolidation of their version of democracy."

One of the dangers of dominant parties is "the tendency of dominant parties to conflate party and state and to appoint party officials to senior positions irrespective of their having the required qualities." However, in some countries this is common practice even when there is no dominant party. In contrast to one-party systems, dominant-party systems can occur within a context of a democratic system as well as an authoritarian one. In a one-party system other parties are banned, but in dominant-party systems other political parties are tolerated, and (in democratic dominant-party systems) operate without overt legal impediment, but do not have a realistic chance of winning; the dominant party genuinely wins the votes of the vast majority of voters every time (or, in authoritarian systems, claims to). Under authoritarian dominant-party systems, which may be referred to as "electoralism" or "soft authoritarianism", opposition parties are legally allowed to operate, but are too weak or ineffective to seriously challenge power, perhaps through various forms of corruption, constitutional quirks that intentionally undermine the ability for an effective opposition to thrive, institutional and/or organizational conventions that support the status quo, occasional but not omnipresent political repression, or inherent cultural values averse to change.

In some states opposition parties are subject to varying degrees of official harassment and most often deal with restrictions on free speech (such as press laws), lawsuits against the opposition, and rules or electoral systems (such as gerrymandering of electoral districts) designed to put them at a disadvantage. In some cases outright electoral fraud keeps the opposition from power. However, some dominant-party systems occur, at least temporarily, in countries that are widely seen, both by their citizens and outside observers, to be textbook examples of democracy. An example of a genuine democratic dominant-party system would be the pre-Emergency India, which was almost universally viewed by all as being a democratic state, even though the only major national party at that time was the Indian National Congress. The reasons why a dominant-party system may form in such a country are often debated: supporters of the dominant party tend to argue that their party is simply doing a good job in government and the opposition continuously proposes unrealistic or unpopular changes, while supporters of the opposition tend to argue that the electoral system disfavors them (for example because it is based on the principle of first past the post), or that the dominant party receives a disproportionate amount of funding from various sources and is therefore able to mount more persuasive campaigns. In states with ethnic issues, one party may be seen as being the party for an ethnicity or race with the party for the majority ethnic, racial or religious group dominating, e.g., the African National Congress in South Africa (governing since the end of apartheid in 1994) has strong support amongst Bantu peoples of South Africa and the Ulster Unionist Party governed Northern Ireland from its creation in 1921 until 1972 with the support of the Protestant majority. Similarly, the Apartheid-era National Party in South Africa had the support of Afrikaners who make up the majority of White South Africans while English-speaking white South Africans tended towards more liberal and reform-oriented parties like the Progressive Federal Party.

Sub-national entities are often dominated by one party due to the area's demographic being on one end of the spectrum or espousing a unique local identity. For example, the current elected government of the District of Columbia has been governed by Democrats since its creation in the 1970s, Bavaria by the Christian Social Union since 1957, Madeira by the Social Democrats since 1976, and Alberta by the Progressive Conservatives from 1971 to 2015. On the other hand, where the dominant party rules nationally on a genuinely democratic basis, the opposition may be strong in one or more subnational areas, possibly even constituting a dominant party locally; an example is South Africa, where although the African National Congress is dominant at the national level, the opposition Democratic Alliance is strong to dominant in the Province of Western Cape.

== Methods of dominant-party governments ==
In dominant-party governments, they use institutional channels, rather than repression, to influence the population. Coercive distribution can control citizens and economic elites through land reform, poverty alleviation, public health, housing, education, and employment programs. Further, they distribute private goods to the winning coalition (people who are necessary for its reign) in order to stay in power. Giving the winning coalition private goods also prevents civil conflict. They also use the education system to teach and uphold compliance. The recruiting, disciplining, and training of teachers allow for authoritarian governments to control teachers into following their objective: to foster compliance from the youth. Another way that they maintain control is through hosting elections. Even though they would not be fair elections, hosting them allows citizens to feel that they have some control and a political outlet. They can also enhance rule within their own state through international collaboration, by supporting and gaining the support, especially economic support, of other similar governments.

== Current dominant-party systems ==
=== Africa ===
- Angola
  - Popular Movement for the Liberation of Angola, Movimento Popular de Libertação de Angola (MPLA): In power since independence, November 11, 1975; sole legal party, 1975–92
  - Formerly led by President José Eduardo dos Santos (in office from September 10, 1979, to August 28, 2017) and now led by João Lourenço.
  - Presidential election, 1992: dos Santos (MPLA-PT) won 49.6% of the vote. As this was not an absolute majority, a runoff against Jonas Savimbi (40.1%) was required, but did not take place.
  - New constitution, 2010: popular election of president abolished in favour of a rule that the top candidate of the most voted party in parliamentary elections becomes president.
  - Parliamentary election, 2022: MPLA 51.17% and 124 of 220 seats.
- Burundi
  - National Council for the Defense of Democracy-Forces for the Defense of Democracy (CNDD-FDD) In power since 2005
  - Led by President Évariste Ndayishimiye, in office since June 18, 2020
  - Presidential election, 2020: Évariste Ndayishimiye (CNDD-FDD) 71.45%
  - Parliamentary election, 2020: CNDD-FDD 70.98% and 72 of 100 seats.
- Cameroon
  - Cameroon People's Democratic Movement (Rassemblement Démocratique et Populaire du Cameroun, RDPC): Led by President Paul Biya, in office since November 6, 1982
  - In power, under various names, since independence, January 1, 1960 (Sole legal party, 1966–1990)
  - Presidential election, 2018: Paul Biya (RDPC) 71.28%
  - Parliamentary election, 2020: RDPC 139 of 180 seats
- Chad:
  - Patriotic Salvation Movement (Mouvement Patriotique de Salut de SMPS) Founded by the former president Idriss Déby and led by President Mahamat Déby.
  - In power since 1990.
  - Parliamentary election, 2024: MPS 124 of 188 seats
  - Presidential election, 2024: Mahamat Déby (MPS) 61.00%.
- Comoros
  - Convention for the Renewal of the Comoros (Convention pour le Renouveau des Comores, CRC): Led by President Azali Assoumani, in office from 30 April 1999 to 21 January 2002, 26 May 2002 to 26 May 2006, and since 26 May 2016
  - In power since its formation in 2002
  - Parliamentary election, 2025: CRC 31 of 33 seats
  - Presidential election, 2024: Azali Assoumani (CRC) 57.02%
- Republic of the Congo
  - Congolese Party of Labour (Parti Congolais du Travail, PCT): Led by President Denis Sassou-Nguesso, in office from February 8, 1979, to August 31, 1992, and since October 15, 1997
  - In power, under various names, from 1969 to 1992 and since 1997 (Sole legal party, 1963–1990)
  - Parliamentary election, 2022: PCT 112 of 151 seats
  - Presidential election, 2021: Denis Sassou-Nguesso (PCT) 88.40%
- Djibouti
  - People's Rally for Progress (Rassemblement Populaire pour de Progrès, RPP)
  - Led by President Ismail Omar Guelleh, in office since May 8, 1999
  - In power since its formation in 1979 (Sole legal party, 1979–1992)
  - Parliamentary election, 2023: RPP in coalition, 93.68% and 59 of 65 seats
  - Presidential election, 2021: Ismail Omar Guelleh (RPP) 97.30%
- Equatorial Guinea
  - Democratic Party of Equatorial Guinea (Partido Democrático de Guinea Ecuatorial, PDGE)
  - Led by President Teodoro Obiang Nguema Mbasogo, in office since August 3, 1979: In power since its formation in 1987 (Sole legal party, 1987–1991)
  - Senate election, 2017: PDGE 92.00% 55 of 70 seats (Includes 15 unelected representatives appointed by the president.)
  - Chamber of People's Representatives election, 2017: PDGE 92.00% 99 of 100 seats
  - Presidential election, 2022: Teodoro Obiang Nguema Mbasogo (PDGE) 97.00%
- Ethiopia
  - Prosperity Party, previously Ethiopian People's Revolutionary Democratic Front (EPRDF): Led by Prime Minister Abiy Ahmed, in office since April 2, 2018
  - In power since May 28, 1991 (party reorganization 2019)
  - Parliamentary election, 2021: 410 of 483 seats
  - Regional election, 2015: Regional partners 1987 of 1990 seats
- Ivory Coast
  - Rally of the Republicans (RHDP)
  - Led by President Alassane Ouattara, in office since 4 December 2010.
  - In power since 2010.
  - Parliamentary election, 2021: RHDP 137 of 255 seats.
  - Presidential election, 2025: Alassane Ouattara (RHDP) 91.23%
- Mozambique
  - Mozambican Liberation Front (FRELIMO)
  - Led by President Daniel Chapo, in office since January 15, 2025
  - In power since independence, June 25, 1975 (Sole legal party, 1975–1990)
  - Presidential election, 2024: Daniel Chapo (FRELIMO) 65.17%
  - Parliamentary election, 2024: FRELIMO 171 of 250 seats
- Namibia
  - South West Africa People's Organisation (SWAPO)
  - Led by President Netumbo Nandi-Ndaitwah, in office since March 21, 2025
  - In power since independence, March 21, 1990
  - Presidential election, 2024: Netumbo Nandi-Ndaitwah (SWAPO) 58.07%
  - Parliamentary election, 2024: SWAPO 53.37% and 51 of 96 seats
  - Regional elections, 2020: SWAPO 88 of 121 seats
- Nigeria
  - Lagos State
    - All Progressives Congress / Alliance for Democracy has won every election in Lagos State since the end of military rule in Nigeria in 1999.
- Rwanda
  - Rwandan Patriotic Front (RPF)
  - Led by President Paul Kagame, in office since March 24, 2000
  - In power since July 19, 1994
  - Presidential election, 2024: Paul Kagame (RPF) 99.18%
  - Parliamentary election, 2024: RPF 68.83% and 37 of 53 seats
- Seychelles
  - Seychelles People's Progressive Front/United Seychelles (SPPF/US)
  - In power since the 1977 Seychelles Coup, excluding a 5 year period from 2020-2025
- South Africa
  - African National Congress
  - Led by President Cyril Ramaphosa, in office since February 15, 2018
  - In power since May 10, 1994
  - Won a majority in every general election from 1994 until 2024
  - Won a two-thirds majority in 1999 and 2004
  - Presidential election, 2018: Cyril Ramaphosa (ANC) 100.0%
  - Parliamentary election, 2024: ANC 159 of 400 seats, 40.18% of the vote
  - Governs 7 out of 9 Provinces
  - Governs 6 out of 8 metropolitan provices.
- South Sudan
  - Sudan People's Liberation Movement (SPLM)
  - Led by President Salva Kiir, in office since July 9, 2011; and was President of Southern Sudan since July 30, 2005
  - In power since independence, July 9, 2011; and in the autonomous Government of Southern Sudan since formation, July 9, 2005
  - Presidential election, 2010: Salva Kiir(SPLM) 92.99%
  - Parliamentary election, 2010: SPLM 160 of 170 seats
- Tanzania
  - Chama Cha Mapinduzi (CCM): Led by President Samia Suluhu Hassan, in office since March 19, 2021
  - In power, under various names, since independence, December 9, 1961 (Sole legal party, 1964–1992)
  - Civic election, 2014: CCM 74.50%
  - Presidential election, 2020: John Magufuli (CCM) 84.40%
  - Parliamentary election, 2020: CCM 350 of 393 seats (Includes 16 unelected representatives)
- Togo
  - Union for the Republic (UNIR): Led by President Faure Gnassingbé, in office since February 5, 2005
  - In power since its formation in 2012
  - Presidential election, 2020: Faure Gnassingbé (UNIR) 70.78%
  - Parliamentary election, 2024: UNIR 108 of 113 seats
- Uganda
  - National Resistance Movement (NRM): Led by President Yoweri Museveni, in office since January 29, 1986.
  - In power as de facto dominant party since January 29, 1986, as a "non-party Movement."
  - Became de jure dominant party with the return of multi-party elections on July 28, 2005.
  - Presidential election, 2021: Yoweri Museveni (NRM) 58.38%
  - Parliamentary election, 2021: NRM 41.60% and 336 of 529 seats
- Zimbabwe
  - Zimbabwe African National Union – Patriotic Front (ZANU-PF): Formerly led by President Robert Mugabe, in office from April 18, 1980, to November 21, 2017 (as president since December 31, 1987) and now led by Emmerson Mnangagwa since November 24, 2017. In power since independence, April 18, 1980
  - Presidential election, 2023: Emmerson Mnangagwa (ZANU-PF) 52.60%
  - Parliamentary election, 2023: ZANU-PF 56.18% and 177 of 280 seats
  - Senate election, 2023: ZANU-PF 33 of 80 seats (Includes 20 unelected representatives)

=== Americas ===
- Antigua & Barbuda
  - The Barbuda People's Movement has ruled the island of Barbuda since 1979, and has won every election for the island's seat in the national House of Representatives except for the 2014 election, which it lost by one vote.
- Barbados
  - The Barbados Labour Party won every seat in the House of Assembly in 2018, 2022, and 2026.
  - 2026 Barbadian general election: Mia Mottley: 69.83%, 30 of 30 seats in the House of Assembly
- Brazil
  - Bahia: the Workers' Party has won every gubernatorial election since 2006.
- Canada
  - Saskatchewan: Since 2007, the Saskatchewan Party has won a majority in every provincial general election.
- Costa Rica
  - Curridabat: 21st Century Curridabat has elected all Curridabat mayors since direct mayoral elections were introduced in Costa Rica in 2002.
  - The National Liberation Party has ruled the cantons of Desamparados, Alajuela, San Carlos, Alvarado and Sarapiqui ever since Mayors are directly elected in 2002. The cantons of Goicoechea, La Unión, El Guarco, Heredia, Santa Bárbara, Carrillo, Abangares, Orotina, Buenos Aires and Corredores since 2006 uninterrupted. Tibás, San Rafael, Flores and San Mateo since 2010 uninterrupted.
  - The Social Christian Unity Party has ruled the canton of San Pablo since 2002, and the canton of Belén since 2006 uninterrupted.
  - The New Generation Party has ruled uninterrupted the canton of Alajuelita for three consecutive terms since 2016.
- Dominica
  - Dominica Labour Party: Led by Roosevelt Skerrit and Charles Savarin
  - In power since 2000
  - 2022 Dominican general election: 82.38% and won 19 of 21 seats
- El Salvador
  - New Ideas: Led by the president Nayib Bukele, in power since 2019.
  - 2021 legislative: Nuevas Ideas won 56 of 84 seats
  - 2024 legislative: Nuevas Ideas won 54 of 60 seats
  - 2024 presidential: Nayib Bukele won with 84.65%
- Mexico
  - Morena (party) has been in power since 2018 both in the federal government and most of the states (24 out of 32 states, representing 74% of the population)
  - Since 2018, Morena and its allies have held a majority in both the chamber of deputies and the senate, growing to 29 out of 32 states going to Morena and its allies in the senate and 256 out of 300 districts in the chamber of deputies for the LXVI legislature running from September 2024 until August 2027.
  - In 2025, judges were voted into office with very low participation from the citizens as well as widespread reports of manipulation, many by the dominant party, which landed judges friendly with Morena into office.
  - Morena currently holds de facto control over the legislative, judicial and executive powers in the vast majority of the country.
  - Guanajuato The National Action Party (PAN) has dominated politics in the state of Guanajuato since 1991, winning every gubernatorial election since 1995.
- Nicaragua
  - FSLN: Led by Daniel Ortega. Presidency since 2007 (and 1979–1990) mayor of every major city, including Managua, majorities in most departments.
  - Local elections, 2012: 75.7% and 127 of 153 seats
  - General election, 2021: Daniel Ortega 75.9%
  - National election, 2016: 66.8%
  - Constituency election, 2016: 65.7%
  - Central American Parliament, 2016: 68.6%
- Paraguay
  - The Colorado Party of Paraguay, 1880–1904 and 1948–2008, and 2014 to the present day. They were the sole legal party from 1947 to 1962. They currently (as of 2025) control the executive and both chambers of Congress.
- Venezuela
  - United Socialist Party of Venezuela led Great Patriotic Pole: In power since 1999, led by Hugo Chavez, Nicolás Maduro, now Delcy Rodriguez
  - 2017 Venezuelan Constituent Assembly election: won 538 of 545 seats
  - 2017 Venezuelan regional elections: 52.7%
  - 2017 Venezuelan municipal elections: GPP 71.31% and won 306 of 365 seats
  - 2018 Venezuelan presidential election: Nicolás Maduro 67.8%
  - 2020 Venezuelan parliamentary election: GPP claimed 70% of the seats.
  - As of 2025, the legislature, judiciary and executive are de facto controlled by Maduro and Rodriguez's party.

=== Asia and Oceania ===
- Australia
  - Australian Capital Territory: Since 2001, the Australian Labor Party has held government continuously in the ACT - sometimes in their own right, and sometimes in coalition with the Australian Greens.
- Cambodia
  - Cambodian People's Party (CPP): Led by former prime minister Hun Sen, in office from 1985 to 2023
  - In power since 1993 (sole legal party 1979–1992)
  - 2022 Cambodian communal elections: 99.46% and 11,510 of 11,572 councillors
  - 2018 Cambodian Senate election: 95.95% and 58 of 58 seats
  - 2023 Cambodian general election: 82.30% and 120 of 125 seats.
- India
  - Gujarat: Since 1998, the Bharatiya Janata Party has consecutively ruled the state legislature of Gujarat.
- Indonesia
  - Bali: Dominated by the Indonesian Democratic Party of Struggle since 2003. The Indonesian Democratic Party of Struggle won gubernatorial elections in 2003, 2008, 2018, and 2024
  - West Sumatra: The Prosperous Justice Party won every gubernatorial elections in 2010, 2015, 2020, and 2024
- Israel
  - Likud (מחל): Led by Prime Minister Benjamin Netanyahu, in office since 29 December 2022 (previously in 31 March 2009–13 June 2021 and 18 June 1996–6 July 1999; Chairman of the Likud since 20 December 2005)
  - In power 1977-1992, 1996-1999, 2001-2005, 2009-2021, and 2022-present.
  - Parties which splintered from the Likud were also part of non-Likud led governments during 1999-2000 (Gesher), 2005-2009 (Kadima) and 2021-22 (New Hope); Kadima itself led the government in 2006-2009.
- Japan: Liberal Democratic Party (LDP), in power 1955–1993, 1996–2009, 2012-2024, 2024-2026 as a minority government, and a supermajority since 2026 in the 2026 Japanese general election.
- Malaysia
  - Kelantan: Led by Parti Islam Se-Malaysia (PAS) under various coalitions (Angkatan Perpaduan Ummah, Barisan Alternatif, Pakatan Rakyat, Gagasan Sejahtera, Perikatan Nasional (PN)) since 1990. PAS also lead the state government as a single party from 1955 to 1973 and as a component party of Barisan Nasional from 1973 to 1978, when they were expelled from BN in the aftermath of the 1977 Kelantan Emergency.
  - Pahang: Led by Barisan Nasional and its predecessor, Perikatan since 1955. Currently lead a coalition government with Pakatan Harapan after the 2022 Pahang state election.
  - Penang: Led by Pakatan Harapan and its predecessor, Pakatan Rakyat since 2008. Currently led a government coalition with Barisan Nasional after the 2023 state election.
  - Sarawak: Led by Gabungan Parti Sarawak and its predecessors (BN Sarawak, Sarawak Alliance) since independence (1963).
  - Selangor: Led by Pakatan Harapan and its predecessor, Pakatan Rakyat since 2008. Currently lead a government coalition with Barisan Nasional after the 2023 state election.
  - Negeri Sembilan: Led by Pakatan Harapan since 2018. Currently lead a government coalition with Barisan Nasional after the 2023 state election.
  - Terengganu: Led by PAS under many coalitions (currently under PN), similar to Kelantan since 2018. The PN coalition won all seats in the state after the 2023 state election.
- Palestinian National Authority
  - West Bank Government (Fatah): Led by President Mahmoud Abbas, in office since January 15, 2005 (as Chairman of the PLO since October 26, 2004)
    - In power since 1994
    - 2005 Palestinian presidential election: Mahmoud Abbas 62.52%
  - Gaza Strip Government (Hamas): Led by Chairman of the Political Bureau (acting) Khaled Mashal, in office since October 16, 2024 (previously in July 31, 2024 – August 6, 2024, and 1996-6 May 2017)
    - In power since 2007
    - 2006 Palestinian legislative election: 74 of 132 seats and 44.45%
- Singapore
  - People's Action Party (PAP): Led by Prime Minister Lawrence Wong, in office since May 15, 2024 (as Secretary-General since December 4, 2024)
  - In power since June 5, 1959
  - Parliamentary election, 2025: PAP won 65.57% of the popular vote and 87 out of 97 seats
  - Presidential election, 2023: Former PAP member Tharman Shanmugaratnam won 70.4% of the vote (Note: Presidents in Singapore are not allowed to belong to any party)
- Tajikistan
  - People's Democratic Party of Tajikistan is headed by President Emomali Rahmon: In power since 1994
  - Presidential election, 2020: Emomali Rahmon 92.08%
  - Parliamentary election, 2020: 47 of 63 seats in Assembly of Representatives
- Turkmenistan
  - Democratic Party of Turkmenistan is headed by Kasymguly Babaev since August 18, 2013
  - Presidential election, 2022: Serdar Berdimuhamedow 72.97%
  - Parliamentary election, 2018: 55 of 125 seats in the Assembly of Turkmenistan
  - In power since independence in 1990
  - Sole legal party until 2012
- Hong Kong
  - Since the handover of Hong Kong to China on July 1, 1997, the pro-China political parties have maintained a long-standing majority in the Legislative Council through the adoption of electoral systems such as functional constituencies. The Democratic Alliance for the Betterment and Progress of Hong Kong (DAB) has consistently been the largest party in the Legislative Council. Since the 2021 imposition of the Decision of the National People's Congress on Improving the Electoral System of the Hong Kong Special Administrative Region "Political System Reform" known as the "311 Decision" by the Chinese central government, the pro-democracy camp has largely been screened out during the eligibility review process, ushering in an era of dominance for one faction in Hong Kong.
- Macao
  - Since the return of Macau to the motherland on December 20, 1999, pro-establishment groups have maintained a majority in the Legislative Assembly through a combination of group elections and official appointments.

=== Eurasia ===
- Azerbaijan
  - New Azerbaijan Party (YAP) has been in power essentially continuously since 1993.
  - Parliamentary election, 2020: 72 of 125 seats
  - Presidential election, 2024: Ilham Aliyev 92.12%
- Georgia
  - Georgian Dream (GD) has been in power with an overall majority in Parliament since 2012. since 2020 the country has transformed fully into a dominant-party system, with opposition parties being heavily marginalized and weakened.
  - Parliamentary election, 2020: 48.22% and 90 of 150 seats
  - Presidential election, 2018: Salome Zourabichvili 59.5% (endorsed by GD, GD amended the constitution to abolish popular vote for the presidency by 2024)
  - Municipality mayors: 65 of 65
- Kazakhstan
  - Amanat
  - Parliamentary election, 2016: 82.20% and 84 of 107 seats in the Majilis
  - Presidential election, 2022: Kassym-Jomart Tokayev 81.31%
- Russia
  - United Russia
    - Led by Dmitry Medvedev (president 2008–2012, prime minister 2012–2020)
    - In power since 2003
    - Presidential election, 2024: Vladimir Putin 88.48% (endorsed by United Russia and several other parties, but ran as an independent)
    - Parliamentary election, 2026: 58.21% and 349 of 450 seats
    - Governors: 60 of 85
- Turkey
  - Justice and Development Party
    - Led by Recep Tayyip Erdoğan (president 2014–present, prime minister 2003–2014)
    - In power since 2002
    - Presidential election, 2023: Recep Tayyip Erdoğan 52.18%
    - Parliamentary election, 2023: 35.61% and 268 of 600 seats

=== Europe ===
- Albania
  - Socialist Party of Albania led by Edi Rama (since 2005); In power since 2013.
  - In the 2013 parliamentary election it came to power by creating a coalition of other leftist parties. Since 2017 it has won a majority of seats.
  - Won 54 out of 61 municipalities in the 2023 local elections
  - Won 83 out of 140 seats in the 2025 parliamentary election.
- Austria
  - Lower Austria
    - Austrian People's Party: Led by Johanna Mikl-Leitner, governor (since 2017); In power since 1945 (Note: The predecessors of the ÖVP (the Christian Social Party) ruled from 1907 until 1933 alone, with the help of the Fatherland Front from 1933 until 1934, and the Fatherland Front ruled alone from 1934 until the Anschluss of 1938.)
    - State election, 2023: VPNÖ 39.93% and won 23 of 56 seats
    - European Parliament election, 2019: ÖVP 40.1%
    - 2019 Austrian legislative election: ÖVP 42.3%
  - Tyrol
    - Austrian People's Party: Led by Anton Mattle, governor (since 2022); In power since 1945
    - State election, 2022: TVP 34.71% and won 14 of 36 seats
    - European Parliament election, 2019: ÖVP 42.6%
    - 2019 Austrian legislative election: ÖVP 45.8%
  - Vienna
    - Social Democratic Party of Austria: Led by Michael Ludwig, mayor (since 2018); In power since 1945 (Note: The SPÖ was previously the continuous ruling party of Vienna from 1919 until 1934, before being taken over by the Fatherland Front and the 1938 Anschluss of Austria.)
    - State election, 2020: SPÖ 41.62% and won 46 of 100 seats
    - 2019 Austrian legislative election: SPÖ 27.1%
    - European Parliament election, 2019: SPÖ 30.3%
  - Vorarlberg
    - Austrian People's Party: Led by Markus Wallner, governor (since 2011); In power since 1945
    - State election, 2019: VVP 43.53% and won 17 of 36 seats
    - European Parliament election, 2019: ÖVP 34.6%
    - 2019 Austrian legislative election: ÖVP 36.6%
  - Upper Austria
    - Austrian People's Party: Led by Thomas Stelzer, governor (since 2017); In power since 1945
    - State election, 2021: OÖVP 37.61% and won 22 of 56 seats
    - 2019 Austrian legislative election: ÖVP 36.8%
    - European Parliament election, 2019: ÖVP 35.1%
- Belarus
  - Belaya Rus (PBR): founded in 2007 to support Lukashenko's presidency.
  - In power since 2023.
  - 2024 Belarusian parliamentary election: BRB 51 of 110 seats.
- Estonia
  - Estonian Reform Party has won all national and local elections in Tartu, the second biggest city, since 1995. Holding mayor's position since 1996.
- Germany
  - Bavaria
    - Christian Social Union in Bavaria (CSU): Led by Markus Söder, Minister-President (since 2018); In power since 1946, with a sole hiatus from 1954 to 1957. From 1966 to 2003 and 2013 to 2018, CSU ruled with an absolute majority. Its share of votes peaked in 1974 at 62%. From 2003 to 2008, CSU held a two-thirds supermajority in the Bavarian Landtag. Since the 2010s, the CSU's dominance has somewhat eroded (31.7% in the 2021 German federal election; 37.2% in the 2018 Bavarian state election), but it is still considered impossible to form a government led by another party in Bavaria. Even before 1946, Bavaria was already a dominant party system before the Third Reich dominated by the Bavarian People's Party (1918–1933), the Bavarian Centrist Party (1887–1918) and the Bavarian Patriot Party (1869–1887).
  - Saxony
    - Christian Democratic Union (CDU): In power since the establishment of the state in 1990. CDU ruled with an absolute majority until 2004, and even a two-thirds supermajority in the Landtag from 1994 to 2004. Its popularity peaked at 56.9% in the 1999 election. In the 2010s, CDU's dominance eroded significantly. In the 2017 German federal election, Saxony's CDU came in second place for the first time in the history of the state, reaching 26.9%, behind the far-right Alternative für Deutschland. Due to the irreconcilability of left-wing and right-wing opposition parties, it is still considered impossible to form a state government led by another party than CDU.
  - Brandenburg
    - Social Democratic Party (SPD): Led by Minister-President Dietmar Woidke (since 2013). In power since the state's establishment in 1990. currently. It won an absolute majority of seats in the Landtag and swept every single-member constituency in 1994, winning 54.1% of the vote. The SPD also swept all of Brandenburg's single-member constituencies in the 2021 federal election.
- Italy
  - Emilia-Romagna
    - Democratic Party (Note: Formerly its predecessors PSI (before 1924), PCI, PDS and DS.): In power since 2007
    - Regional election, 2024: PD 42.9% and 28 of 50 seats
    - European Parliament election, 2024: PD 36.1%
    - Chamber of Deputies, 2022: PD 28.1%
  - Lombardy
    - Centre-right coalition: In power since 1994
    - Regional election, 2018: CDX 56.27% and won 49 of 80 seats
    - Presidential election, 2018: Attilio Fontana 54.67%
    - Chamber of Deputies election, 2022: CDX 50.6%
    - Senate election, 2018: CDX 50.4%
  - Tuscany
    - Democratic Party: In power since 2007
    - Regional election, 2015: PD 48.1% and 25 of 41 seats
    - European Parliament election, 2014: PD 52.5%
    - Chamber of Deputies election, 2018: PD 29.6%
    - Senate election, 2018: PD 30.5%
  - South Tyrol
    - South Tyrolean People's Party: In power since 1948 (The German Association dominated from 1921 and before that it was part of Tyrol)
    - 1924 Italian general election: German Association, part of Lists of Slavs and Germans 80%
    - Provincial elections, 2013: SVP 45.7% and 17 of 35 seats
    - European Parliament election, 2014: SVP 48.0%
    - Chamber of Deputies election, 2018: SVP 48.8%
    - Senate election, 2018: SVP 49.8%
  - Veneto
    - Centre-right coalition: In power since 1994
    - Came in second place in Veneto to the Democratic Party in the European Parliament election, 2014: FI+LN+FdI 33.2%
    - Regional election, 2015: CDX 52.2% and won 29 of 51 seats
    - Presidential election, 2015: Luca Zaia 50.1%
    - Chamber of Deputies election, 2018: CDX 48.1%
    - Senate election, 2018: CDX 48.2%
- Moldova
  - Transnistria
    - Self-declared state
    - Obnovlenie: In power since 2005
    - Parliamentary election, 2020: Renewal 27.79% and 29 of 33 seats
    - Presidential election, 2016: Vadim Krasnoselsky, as independent candidate, 59.16%
- Portugal
  - Madeira: the Social Democratic Party has dominated political life in the autonomous region of Madeira since the first regional elections, in 1976. Alberto João Jardim served as President of the Regional Government uninterruptedly from 1978 to 2015.
    - Local elections, 2013: PSD 34.81%
    - European Parliament election, 2014 (in Madeira): PSD 31.0%
    - Regional election, 2015: PSD 48.56% and 25 of 47 seats
    - 2015 Portuguese legislative election (in Madeira): PSD 37.8% and 3 of 6 seats
- San Marino
  - The Sammarinese Christian Democratic Party (PDCS) have always had a plurality of seats in the Grand and General Council since 1951, However it has not consistently formed the government. From 2016 to 2020 it was in opposition. The predecessor of the PDCS the Sammarinese People's Party was already biggest party in 1920.
  - General election, 2019. PDCS 33.35%
- Spain
  - Basque Country
    - Basque Nationalist Party, in power in the Basque Government from 1979 to 2009, and again since 2012.
    - Basque election, 2020: PNV 38.7%, 31 of 75 seats.
    - Spanish Parliament election, November 2019: PNV 32.0%, 6 of 18 seats.
  - Castilla-La Mancha
    - Spanish Socialist Workers' Party, in power in the Castilian-Manchegan Government from 1982 to 2011, and again since 2015.
    - Castilian-Manchegan election, 2019: PSOE 44.1%, 19 of 33 seats.
    - Spanish Parliament election, November 2019: PSOE 33.1%, 9 of 21 seats.
  - Castile and León
    - People's Party (Note: Formerly its predecessor People's Alliance (before 1989).), in power in the Castile and León Government continuously since 1987.
    - Castilian-Leonese election, 2022: PP 31.4%, 31 of 81 seats.
    - Spanish Parliament election, November 2019: PP 31.6%, 13 of 31 seats.
  - Community of Madrid
    - People's Party, in power in the Government of the Community of Madrid continuously since 1995.
    - Madrilenian election, 2021: PP 44.8%, 65 of 136 seats.
    - Spanish Parliament election, November 2019: PP 26.9%, 10 of 37 seats.
  - Galicia
    - People's Party, in power in the Galician Government from 1982 to 1987, from 1990 to 2005, and again since 2009.
    - Galician election, 2020: PP 47.6%, 41 of 75 seats.
    - Spanish Parliament election, November 2019: PP 31.9%, 10 of 23 seats.
- Ukraine
  - Kharkiv
    - Kernes Bloc — Successful Kharkiv a party formed from members of the Party of Regions, previously dominant in the Verkhovna Rada of Ukraine, led by the mayor of Kharkiv Hennadiy Kernes, who was elected three times in a row in elections with a result of more than 50% of the vote.
- United Kingdom:
  - London:
    - London Labour has won the majority of seats to the House of Commons in London in every election since 1997. It has also been the largest party in the London Assembly for most of its existence with exception to 2008–12.
  - Scotland:
    - The Scottish National Party has been the largest party in the Scottish Parliament since 2007. It also won the majority of seats to the House of Commons in Scotland in every election from 2015 until it lost to Scottish Labour in 2024.
  - Epsom and Ewell
    - The Residents Associations of Epsom and Ewell have been the largest party in Epsom and Ewell Borough Council since its founding in 1937, having won each election since then by supermajority. This makes it arguably the longest continuous ruling political party in a liberal democracy, having governed essentially unchallenged for nearly 90 years.

== Formerly dominant parties ==
=== North America ===
- Canada:
  - Alberta:
    - The Progressive Conservative Association of Alberta (often referred to colloquially as the Progressive Conservative Party of Alberta or the Alberta PC Party) formed the provincial government, without interruption, from 1971 until the party's defeat in the 2015 provincial election. At 44 years, this was the longest unbroken run in government for a political party at the provincial or federal level in Canadian history.
    - In 2017, the Alberta PC Party merged with Alberta's other major centre-right party, the Wildrose Party, to become the United Conservative Party (UCP). The UCP has formed the provincial government since 2019, winning their second consecutive election in 2023.
  - Ontario:
    - The Progressive Conservative Party of Ontario (known colloquially as the Ontario PC Party or simply as the "Tories") enjoyed a 43-year unbroken stretch as the party that formed the provincial government from 1943 to 1985. The party in particular was at its most powerful under the Red Tory principles of premier Bill Davis from 1971 to 1985; its dominance led the party to be nicknamed "The Big Blue Machine" during this era.
    - The Ontario PC Party would regain power from 1995 to 2002 under Blue Tory premier Mike Harris and his brief successor Ernie Eves, and has formed the provincial government since 2018 under Doug Ford, winning elections in 2022 and 2025 as well.
- Mexico:
  - The Institutional Revolutionary Party (PRI) and its predecessors Partido Nacional Revolucionario (PNR) (1929–1938) and Partido de la Revolución Mexicana (PRM) (1938–1946) in Mexico held the presidency from 1929 to 2000. The party governed all states until 1989 and controlled both chambers of congress until 1997. As of 2023, the PRI has continued an uninterrupted hold of the governorship in one state: Coahuila.
  - The Liberal Party, later known as the National Porfirist Party, ruled consistently from 1867 to 1911.
- Southern United States:
  - After Reconstruction through the Jim Crow era, and until the 1990s in non-presidential elections, the South (usually defined as coextensive with the former Confederacy) was known as the "Solid South" due to its states' exceptionally reliable support of the Democratic Party, enabled in part by significant amounts of voter suppression and outright election subversion during Jim Crow.

=== Caribbean and Central America ===
- Antigua and Barbuda: The Antigua Labour Party in Antigua and Barbuda, 1960–1971 and 1976–2004. They are currently ruling, but may not be yet considered dominant.
- Barbados: The Barbados Labour Party in the Barbados from 1994 to 2008. They are currently ruling, but may not be yet considered dominant. The Democratic Labour Party from 1961 to 1976.
- Bahamas: The Progressive Liberal Party in the Bahamas from 1967 to 1992
- Bermuda: The United Bermuda Party in Bermuda from 1968 to 1998.
- Costa Rica:
  - The National Republican Party ruled Costa Rica between 1932 and 1948.
  - The National Liberation Party is often referred as the hegemonic or dominant party between 1953 and 1983 as it won most elections, it held the majority in the Legislative Assembly between 1953 and 1978, held consecutive governments several times and was only defeated in 1958, 1966 and 1978 thanks to the entire right-wing opposition nominating a common candidate in coalition. Only after 1983 with the merge of the Unity Coalition into the Social Christian Unity Party Costa Rica started its two-party system.
  - Non-Partisan Liberals dominated Costa Rican presidency from 1846 to 1868.
  - San José: Johnny Araya was the Mayor of San Jose from 1998 to 2013 and from 2016 to 2024, both times almost entirely as a member of the National Liberation Party. PLN also ruled the cantons of Acosta, Mora, Naranjo, Upala, Santo Domingo, San Isidro, Nicoya and Montes de Oro uninterrupted between 2002 and 2020, the cantons of Santa Ana, Poás and Bagaces from 2006-2020, the cantons of León Cortés, San Ramón, Carrillo, Abangares, Osa, Parrita and Garabito from 2006 to 2024.
  - Social Christian Unity Party ruled the cantons of Tilarán, Naranjo and Coto Brus uninterrupted between 2002 and 2020, and Atenas between 2002 and 2024.
  - Citizens' Action Party ruled Hojancha uninterrupted between 2010-2024.
- Dominican Republic: The Blue Party from 1879 to 1899. The Dominican Liberation Party from 2004 to 2020.
- El Salvador:
  - The Liberal Party (PL) held the presidency from 1871 to 1918 (11 elections)
  - The National Democratic Party (PDN) held the presidency from 1918 to 1927 (3 elections)
  - The National Pro Patria Party (PNPP) held the presidency from 1933 to 1944 (3 elections)
  - The Revolutionary Party of Democratic Unification (PRUD) held the presidency from 1950 to 1960 (2 elections)
  - The National Conciliation Party (PCN) held the presidency from 1962 to 1979 (4 elections)
  - The Nationalist Republican Alliance (ARENA) held the presidency from 1989 to 2009 (4 elections)
- Guatemala: The Conservative Party in Guatemala from 1851 and 1871; the Liberal Party in Guatemala from 1871 and 1920, 1921 and 1926, 1931 and 1944.
- Honduras: The National Party in Honduras from 1933 to 1956, and again from 2010 to 2022.
- Nicaragua:
  - The Partido Liberal Nacionalista of the Somoza family held effective control from the 1930s to 1979. It was never the sole legal party, but elections were often fraught with accusations of fraud and improbable results.
  - Conservative Party ruled from 1857 to 1893
- Puerto Rico: The Popular Democratic Party in Puerto Rico from 1949 to 1969.
- Saint Vincent and the Grenadines
  - Unity Labor Party ruled from 2001 to 2025
- Trinidad and Tobago: People's National Movement ruled from 1956 to 1986.

=== South America ===
- Argentina:
  - The National Autonomist Party (PAN) of Argentina from 1874 to 1916.
  - The Federal Party from 1829 to 1852.
    - San Luis: The conservative Liberal Democratic Party ruled the province between 1922 and 1943. The Justicialist Party has won every gubernatorial election between 1973 and 2019.
    - Neuquén: Neuquén People's Movement has won every gubernatorial election since 1962 and until the 2023 gubernatorial election.
    - Santa Cruz: The Justicialist Party has won every gubernatorial election between 1973 and 2019.
- Bolivia: Liberal Party ruled from 1899 to 1920. The Revolutionary Nationalist Movement (MNR) in Bolivia from 1952 to 1964.
  - Movement for Socialism (MAS) from 2006 to 2019 and from 2020 to 2025.
  - 2020 Bolivian general election: Luis Arce: 55.10%, won 75 chamber seats and 21 senate seats
- Brazil: The National Renewal Alliance Party (ARENA) in Brazil from 1965 to 1979.
    - São Paulo: has been dominated by the Brazilian Social Democracy Party since 1994, until election of Tarcísio de Freitas in 2022.
- Chile: From 1829 to 1871, a successive number of parties (Pelucones to Conservative to National Party) governed Chile. From 1990 to 2010 the Concertación Coalition hold presidency.
- Colombia: The Liberal Party of Colombia from 1861 to 1886, and later on from 1886 to 1900 as the brief successor party National Party, and Colombian Conservative Party from 1900 to 1930
- Ecuador: Ecuadorian Radical Liberal Party ruled from 1895 to 1925. PAIS Alliance ruled from 2007 to 2021.
- Guyana: The People's National Congress from 1964 to 1992. The People's Progressive Party from 1992 to 2015.
- Paraguay: Liberal Party from 1912 to 1936
- Uruguay: The Colorado Party of Uruguay, between 1865 and 1959
- Venezuela: Conservative Party ruled from 1830 to 1851. Fifth Republic Movement ruled from 1999 until its merging with the newly created United Socialist Party of Venezuela in 2007, which has been the ruling party since then.

=== Europe ===
- Armenia: The Republican Party of Armenia controlled the country from 1999 until 2018, when it lost all of its seats in parliament after the 2018 Armenian revolution and the 2018 parliamentary election.
- Austria: The Austrian People's Party ruled as the dominant governing coalition leader from 1945 to 1970, and the Social Democratic Party of Austria, under a similar arrangement, from 1970 to 2000.
  - Austria-Hungary: The Cisleithania Minister-Presidency was dominated by the Constitutional Party from 1871 to 1893.
    - Vienna: The Social Democratic Workers' Party of Austria (predecessor of the SPÖ, in power since 1945), dominated Vienna between 1911 and 1934.
    - Lower Austria: The Christian Social Party (predecessor of the ÖVP, in power since 1945), dominated Lower Austria between 1907 and 1934.
    - Upper Austria: The Christian Social Party (predecessor of the ÖVP), dominated Upper Austria between 1907 and 1934.
    - Vorarlberg: The Christian Social Party (predecessor of the ÖVP), dominated Vorarlberg between 1907 and 1934.
    - Tyrol: The Christian Social Party (predecessor of the ÖVP), dominated Tyrol between 1907 and 1934.
    - Salzburg: The Salzburger Volkspartei, the ÖVP and their predecessors dominated Salzburg between 1919 and 2004. (Note: The predecessors of the ÖVP are the Christian Social Party ruled from 1907 to the renaming 1933 and the Fatherland Front ruled from 1933 to the Anschluss 1938.)
    - Styria: The Steirische Volkspartei, the ÖVP and their predecessors dominated Styria between 1907 and 2005.
- Belgium: The Catholic Party sent prime ministers from 1884 to 1937. The Catholic People's Party sent prime ministers from 1979 to 1999.
  - Flanders: The Christian Social Party and the Christen-Democratisch en Vlaams dominated Flanders from at least 1968 to 1999.
- Bulgaria: GERB was the ruling party from 2009 to 2021 (with an exception from 2013 to 2014). It is the biggest Bulgarian party.
- Croatia: The Croatian Democratic Union was in power from the first multi-party elections in 1990, when Croatia was still a constituent republic of SFR Yugoslavia, until it lost the parliamentary and presidential elections in 2000. For most of the 1990s, the party had an absolute majority in both the Chamber of Representatives and the Chamber of Counties, while its chairman, Franjo Tuđman, was President of Croatia under a de facto superpresidential system of government until his death in 1999.
- Denmark: The National Landowners, and later the Højre, ruled Denmark from 1874 to 1901.
- Estonia: Estonian Centre Party has held the mayorship in Tallinn since 2005, having won a majority of the city council seats there four consecutive times. In 2021, they received 38 out of 79 seats and formed a coalition.
- Finland: The Agrarian League, later the Centre Party, dominated the Presidency under Urho Kekkonen from 1956 to 1982.
- France: During the tenure of Napoleon III (first as president 1848 to 1852 then as Emperor from 1852 to 1870), the Bonapartists were a loose ruling political organization. Since the Fifth Republic, the main presidential parties, Les Républicains (centre-right) or the Parti Socialiste (centre-left), were the biggest parties in over half of the presidential elections, until both parties lost dominance in France since 2017, as centrist politician Emmanuel Macron of En Marche became president, with French right-wing leader Marine Le Pen as the main opponent. Both parties have taken dominance since the 2017 French presidential election.
- Georgia: The Union of Citizens of Georgia was the dominant political force from its establishment in 1995 to its dissolution and overthrow in 2003 in the Rose Revolution, during which the party's leader and president, Eduard Shevardnadze, was ousted.
- Germany: The Christian Democratic Union ruled West Germany and later a unified Germany from its establishment in 1949 to 1969, and again from 1982 to 1998 and from 2005 to 2021.
  - Baden-Württemberg: The Christian Democratic Union of Germany ruled from 1953 to 2011 and was the biggest party until 2016 (except in Württemberg-Baden for 1950–1952), but is still the biggest party at the German federal elections and European Parliament elections. In the predecessor state of Baden, the Centre Party was the biggest party during the Weimar era until 1930.
  - Bavaria: The Bavarian Patriot Party (until 1887), the Centre Party (until 1918) and the Bavarian People's Party were the biggest parties in the Bavarian Landtag from 1869 to 1933 and ruled from 1920 to 1933.
  - Saar (not part of Germany at the time): The Centre Party won every Landesrat election from 1922 to 1935.
  - Saar Protectorate (not part of Germany at the time): The Saarland Christian People's Party held the majority from 1947 to 1955, which was broken by the similar CDU in 1955.
  - Saarland: The Christian Democratic Union of Germany ruled from the return of the Saar to (West) Germany in 1959 to 1980. In the Landtag elections, the CDU reached between 36.6% in 1955 and 49.1% in 1975; the CDU also dominated federal elections (except in 1972), and in the 1979 European Parliament election, the CDU/CSU won 46.4%.
  - Thuringia: From the establishment of the state, the Christian Democratic Union of Germany ruled without interruption until 2014, with an absolute majority from 1999 to 2009. Since 2014, it has been in opposition.
- Hungary
  - Hungary: The Deák Party (which merged with the Left Centre to form the Liberal Party in 1875) ruled Hungary from 1867 to 1905, and the National Party of Work between 1910 and 1918.
  - Hungary: The Unity Party and the Party of National Unity (renamed Party of Hungarian Life in 1939) governed the Kingdom of Hungary from 1922 to 1944.
  - Hungary: After the elected Prime Minister Ferenc Nagy was forced into exile in May 1947, the Hungarian Communist Party became the Hungary's de facto ruling party until formally declaring the country to be a single-party state in August 1949.
  - Fidesz–KDNP: In power from 2010 to 2026, winning over two-thirds of the seats in the Hungarian Parliament over four terms in 2010, 2014, 2018 and 2022. However, the party was heavily defeated in the 2026 Hungarian parliamentary election.
- Ireland: Ireland's Fianna Fáil was the largest party in Dáil Éireann between 1932 and 2011 and in power for 61 of those 79 years. However, the party were heavily defeated in the 2011 Irish general election, coming third.
- Italy: Italy's Christian Democracy dominated Italian politics for almost 50 years as the major party in every coalition that governed the country from 1944 until its demise amid a welter of corruption allegations in 1992–1994. The main opposition to the Christian democratic governments was the Italian Communist Party.
  - Emilia-Romagna: The Italian Socialist Party dominated the region from 1909 until the rise of Fascism.
  - Emilia-Romagna: The Italian Communist Party dominated the region from 1946 until 1991.
  - Emilia-Romagna: The Democratic Party of the Left dominated the region from 1991 until 1998.
  - Emilia-Romagna: The Democrats of the Left dominated the region from 1998 until 2007.
  - Tuscany: The Italian Communist Party dominated the region from 1946 until 1953, and then from 1963 until 1991.
  - Tuscany: The Democratic Party of the Left dominated the region from 1991 until 1998.
  - Tuscany: The Democrats of the Left dominated the region from 1998 until 2007.
- Liechtenstein: The Progressive Citizens' Party governed from 1928 to 1970.
- Luxembourg: The Christian Social People's Party (CSV), with its predecessor, Party of the Right, governed Luxembourg continuously from 1915 to 2013, except for 1974–1979. However, Luxembourg has a coalition system, and the CSV has been in coalition with at least one of the other two leading parties for all but four years. It has always won a plurality of seats in parliamentary elections, although it lost the popular vote in 1964 and 1974.
- Malta: The Nationalist Party dominated the Maltese political scene from 1988 to 2013, when the Labour Party won the government in the 2013 general election.
- Monaco: Rally & Issues governed the National Assembly from 1962 to 2003.
- Montenegro: The Democratic Party of Socialists (DPS) ruled Montenegro from 1990 to 2020, having been defeated in the 2020 election.
- Norway: The Norwegian Labour Party ruled from 1935 to 1965 (including the 5 years of Government-in-exile during World War II), though it has been the biggest party in Norway since 1927 and has been in power many other times.
- Poland: The Law and Justice party (PiS) won the majority of seats in the Sejm and formed governments in 2015 and 2019, while also winning the Presidency in 2015 and 2020. After the 2023 Parliamentary election, they lost the majority in the Sejm and failed to establish a government coalition.
- Portugal:
  - The Portuguese Republican Party, during most of the Portuguese First Republic's existence (1910–1926): After the coup that put an end to Portugal's constitutional monarchy in 1910, the electoral system, which had always ensured victory to the party in government, was left unchanged. Before 1910, it had been the reigning monarch's responsibility to ensure that no one party remain too long in government, usually by disbanding Parliament and calling for new elections. The republic's constitution added no such proviso, and the Portuguese Republican Party was able to keep the other minor republican parties (monarchic parties had been declared illegal) from winning elections. On the rare occasions when it was ousted from power, it was overthrown by force, and it was again by the means of a counter-coup that it returned to power, until its final fall, with the republic itself, in 1926.
  - The Social Democratic Party dominated several Portuguese governments between 1980 and 1995, with the exception of the governing coalition with the Socialist Party between 1983 and 1985.
  - As a semi-presidential republic, Portugal's President has significant residual power. From 1986 to 2006, the Presidency was in the hand of the Socialist Party; since 2006, it is the Social Democratic Party that currently controls the Presidency.
- South Ossetia
  - United Ossetia, led by Anatoliy Bibilov, has been power since 2014 (a continuation of the governing 2001–2014 Unity Party, now defunct). It won the parliamentary election in 2014 with 44.84% of the vote and 20 of 34 seats, and won again in the 2017 Presidential election with 54.80% of the vote.
- Serbia: The dominant party in Serbia is the Serbian Progressive Party led by Aleksandar Vučić. The party has won all parliamentary and presidential elections since 2012 and rules in almost all municipalities and cities in the country.
  - Kingdom of Serbia: People's Radical Party, led by Nikola Pašić, dominated the political landscape of the Kingdom of Serbia from 1904 and 1918. Pašić also served as the Prime Minister of the Kingdom of Yugoslavia from 1918 to 1926 with brief interruptions.
  - FR Yugoslavia: The Socialist Party of Serbia controlled the country from 1992 to 2000.
    - Serbia
      - Serbian Progressive Party: In power since 2012, led by Miloš Vučević
      - Parliamentary election, 2022: SNS 44.27% and 120 of 250 seats
      - Presidential election, 2022: Aleksandar Vučić, 60.01%
      - 2020 Vojvodina provincial election: SNS 61.58% and 76 of 120
- Spain
  - Andalusia: The PSOE-A party (the Andalusian branch of nationwide PSOE) was the ruling party in the Andalusian Autonomous Government continuously between 1978 and 2019, being also the most voted party in all elections for the Parliament of Andalusia during that interval, except one (2012). After the 2018 Andalusian election, a right-to-centre coalition led by the People's Party entered office, and in 2022 the People's Party achieved an absolute majority.
  - Catalonia: The Convergence and Union coalition (federated political party after 2001) in Catalonia governed the autonomous Catalan government from 1980 to 2003, under the leadership of Jordi Pujol, with parliamentary absolute majority or in coalition with other smaller parties. The party later governed again from 2010 until its dissolution in 2015.
  - Extremadura
    - Spanish Socialist Workers' Party, in power in the Extremaduran Government from 1983 to 2011, and again since 2015.
    - Extremaduran election, 2019: PSOE 46.8%, 34 of 65 seats.
    - Spanish Parliament election, November 2019: PSOE 38.3%, 5 of 10 seats.
  - Valencian Community: The People's Party of the Valencian Community (the Valencian branch of nationwide People's Party) was the ruling party in the Valencian Autonomous Government between 1995 and 2015, being the most voted party in all elections for the Valencian Parliament during that interval. After the 2015 Valencian elections, a left-to-centre coalition entered office.
- Switzerland: From 1848 to 1891, the Free Democratic Party held all seven seats of the Federal Council, thus having full control of the Swiss Directorial Government.
- Sweden: The Swedish Social Democratic Party in Sweden governed from 1932 to 2006, except for some months in 1936 (1936–1939 and 1951–1957 in coalition with the Farmers' League, 1939–1945 at the head of a government of national unity), 1976–1982 and 1991–1994. The party is still the largest party in Sweden and has been so in every general election since 1917 (hence the largest party even before the universal suffrage was introduced in 1921). The former prime minister and party leader Tage Erlander led the Swedish government for an uninterrupted tenure of 23 years (1946–1969), the longest in any democracy so far. Since 2006, the party support has declined, but in 2014, it returned to government, although its centre-left coalition had no majority.
- Turkey: In Turkey's single-party period lasting until 1945, the Republican People's Party (CHP) was the major political organisation of the single-party state. However, the CHP faced two opposition parties during this period, both established upon the request of the founder of the Republic of Turkey and CHP leader, Mustafa Kemal Atatürk, in efforts to allegedly jump-start multiparty democracy in Turkey. The pro-Kurdish Peoples' Democratic Party (Note: Formerly its predecessors People's Labor Party (split from Social Democratic Populist Party), Freedom and Equality Party, Freedom and Democracy Party, Democracy Party, People's Democracy Party, Democratic People's Party, Participatory Democracy Party, Democratic Society Party, Peace and Democracy Party, Thousand Hope Candidates and Labour, Democracy and Freedom Bloc.) was the dominant party in the mainly Kurdish southeast from 1991 until the 2016 Turkish coup d'état attempt which resulted in massive purges and the takeover of municipalities by the state. The landslide election victories of the Justice and Development Party led to the party gaining majority in parliament between 2002 and 2018. Since the 2018 parliamentary election, the party has minority in the parliament.
- United Kingdom:
  - The Whigs dominated the Kingdom of Great Britain's politics from 1714 to 1762 during the Whig supremacy.
  - The Tories, governed from 1783 to 1806, and 1807 to 1830.
  - The Liberal Party governed from 1905 to 1922.
  - The Conservative Party, governed from 1895 to 1905, and from 1935 to 1945, and from 1951 to 1963, and from 1979 to 1997, and lastly from 2010 to 2024.
  - The Labour Party governed from 1997 to 2010.
  - Northern Ireland:
    - The Ulster Unionist Party won every election between 1921 and 1972 in the former devolved administration of Northern Ireland.
  - Scotland:
    - Scottish Labour won every election to the House of Commons in Scotland from 1964 to 2015, where it was heavily defeated and reduced to 1 seat.
    - It controlled the Scottish Parliament from its inception in 1999 until the 2007 election where it lost to the SNP.
  - Wales:
    - While Welsh Labour has won the majority of seats to the House of Commons in Wales in every election since 1922, it was the largest party in the Senedd (formerly known as the National Assembly for Wales, until 2020) from its inception in 1999 until a historic defeat in the 2026 Senedd election, winning only 9 of 96 seats and falling to third place.

=== Asia ===
- Afghanistan: In Afghanistan, the People's Democratic Party of Afghanistan was the only legal political party from 1978 until 1987 when other parties were allowed while the PDPA remained the dominant political party until 1992.
- Bangladesh: In Bangladesh, the Awami League was the country's predominant political party between 1972 and 1975 and from 2009 to 2024. After the military coup of 1975, the Bangladesh Nationalist Party (BNP) became the dominant political force between 1977 and 1982. Under the autocratic regime of General Hussain Muhammad Ershad, the Jatiya Party was the dominant party between 1986 and 1990. Bangladesh Awami League again became the dominant political party in 2008 and ended in 2024 after Sheikh Hasina's resignation amid the July Uprising in 2024.
- Burma: The Anti-Fascist People's Freedom League in Burma (now Myanmar) from 1948 to 1962. The Union Solidarity and Development Party from 2011 to 2016 (as a military junta from 1988 to 2011).
- Cambodia: The Democratic Party was the dominant party in Cambodia from 1946 to 1955, The Sangkum in Cambodia was the dominant party under Prince Norodom Sihanouk as head of government from 1955 to 1970. Under the Khmer Republic the Social Republican Party was the dominant party under General Lon Nol from 1972 to 1975.
- Republic of China: The Kuomintang established a de facto one-party state in the Republic of China on the mainland and subsequently on Taiwan until political liberalization and the lifting of martial law in the late 1980s. The Kuomintang continued to dominate the political system until the victory of the opposition Democratic Progressive Party in the 2000 presidential election. The Kuomintang maintained control of the Legislative Yuan until 2016.
- India: The Indian National Congress had continuously ruled the parliament of India and various state legislatures since independence in 1947 to 1977 and 1980 to 1989.
  - Odisha: The Biju Janata Dal had ruled the state legislature of Odisha for 24 years (winning election for five consecutive times from 2000 to 2024).
  - Sikkim: The Sikkim Democratic Front had ruled the state legislature of Sikkim for 24 years (winning election for five consecutive times from 1994 to 2019).
  - Tripura: The Tripura Left Front, comprising parties such as the Communist Party of India (Marxist), the Communist Party of India, All India Forward Bloc and the Revolutionary Socialist Party had ruled the state legislature of Tripura for 24 years (winning election for five consecutive times from 1993 to 2018).
  - West Bengal: The West Bengal Left Front, comprising parties such as the Communist Party of India (Marxist), the Communist Party of India, All India Forward Bloc and the Revolutionary Socialist Party had ruled the state legislature of West Bengal for 34 years (winning election for seven consecutive times from 1977 to 2011).
- Indonesia: The Golkar (acronym of Golongan Karya or Functional Groups) organization, in power from 1971 to 1999 in support for President Suharto.
  - Central Java: Dominated by the Indonesian Democratic Party of Struggle since 2003. Led by Indonesian Democratic Party of Struggle politicians during 2003-2023
  - Depok City: Led by Prosperous Justice Party politicians during 2005-2025
- Iran: The Iran Novin Party dominated Iran's parliament, cabinet, and local councils from 1964 until Iran became a one-party state in 1975.
- Israel: Mapai in Israel was the dominant party from the establishment of the state of Israel in 1948 (and before 1944 they won the Assembly of Representatives since 1925) until merging into present-day Israeli Labor Party in 1968. The Labor Party started losing influence in the 1970s, particularly following the Yom Kippur War, and eventually lost power in the 1977 election. The Labor Party continued to participate in several coalition governments until 2009.
- South Korea: Conservative parties: Liberal Party (South Korea) in power 1948–1960, Democratic Republican Party (South Korea) in power 1962–1980, Democratic Justice Party in power 1980–1990, Democratic Liberal Party (South Korea) in power 1990–1995, New Korea Party in power 1995–1997 and Saenuri Party in power 2008–2017.
- Malaysia: Barisan Nasional (BN), in power from 1974 to 2018, defeated in 2018 election. Also in a coalition government with Perikatan Nasional from 2020 to 2022 in the wake of 2020 Malaysian political crisis, with BN leading from 2021 to 2022. Its predecessor Perikatan also held power from 1955 to 1973. After the 2022 Malaysian general election, despite currently in a coalition government led by Pakatan Harapan, BN is no longer dominant in the Malaysian politics.
  - Johor: Barisan Nasional (and its predecessor Perikatan), in power from 1954 to 2018, defeated in 2018 election. Regained power in the wake of 2020 Malaysian political crisis and won the 2022 Johor state election.
  - Kedah: Barisan Nasional (and its predecessor Perikatan), in power from 1955 to 2008, defeated in 2008 election. Regained power in the 2013 state elections, but defeated again in the 2018 election.
  - Kelantan: Barisan Nasional, in power from 1978, when they won the 1978 state election in Kelantan and governed in a coalition with BERJASA, until 1990, when BN were defeated in that year's election.
  - Melaka: Barisan Nasional (and its predecessor Perikatan), in power from 1955 to 2018, defeated in 2018 election. Regained power in the wake of 2020 Malaysian political crisis and won the 2021 Melaka state election.
  - Negeri Sembilan: Barisan Nasional (and its predecessor Perikatan), in power from 1955 to 2018, defeated in 2018 election. Currently BN is in a government coalition led by Pakatan Harapan after the 2023 state election.
  - Penang: Barisan Nasional, in power from 1974 to 2008 under main component party in Penang Gerakan, defeated in 2008 election. Gerakan as a single party also won state election in 1969, winning it from BN predecessor Perikatan, who held power in the state from 1955.
  - Perak: Barisan Nasional, in power from 1974 to 2008, defeated in 2008 election. BN regained power in 2009 as a result of 2009 Perak constitutional crisis, and won the 2013 Perak state election. BN would lose the Perak government again after defeat in the 2018 state election, but regained power in the wake of 2020 Malaysian political crisis. Its predecessor Perikatan also held power from 1955 to 1969. Currently lead a coalition government with Pakatan Harapan after the 2022 Perak state election.
  - Perlis: Barisan Nasional (and its predecessor Perikatan), in power from 1955 to 2022, defeated in 2022 election.
  - Sabah: Barisan Nasional, in power from 1976 to 1985 (led by component party BERJAYA), 1986 to 1990 (led by component party PBS), and from 1994 to 2018 (led by component party UMNO Sabah). Currently BN is in a coalition government with Gabungan Rakyat Sabah (GRS), after the 2020 Sabah state election. PBS also led the state government as a single party from 1985 to 1986, and as part of Gagasan Rakyat coalition from 1990 to 1994. Before BN, Perikatan Sabah (Sabah Alliance) holds power in Sabah from its independence in 1963 to 1976.
  - Selangor: Barisan Nasional, in power from 1974 to 2008, defeated in 2008 election. Its predecessor Perikatan also held power from 1955 to 1969.
  - Terengganu: Barisan Nasional (and its predecessor Perikatan), in power from 1955 to 2018, with exception to 1959–1961 and 1999–2004, when the state government were controlled by Parti Islam Se-Malaysia (PAS). Defeated in the 2018 election.
- Northern Cyprus: The National Unity Party governed from 1983 to 2005.
- Philippines: The Nacionalista Party in the Philippines was the dominant party during various times in the nation's history from 1916–1941, and on 1945. From 1978 to 1986 Kilusang Bagong Lipunan operated as a dominant party.
- Sri Lanka: The United National Party from 1977 to 1994, and the Sri Lanka Freedom Party from 1994 to 2015 (except for a brief interregnum from 2001 to 2004).
- Syria: The Syrian Arab Socialist Ba'ath Party ruled from 1963 to 2024, with nominal multi-party system from 2012.
- Thailand: The Thai Rak Thai Party was the first political party to surpass the majority in the House of Representatives. During the general election, it became a dominant party until a coup d'état ousted Prime Minister Thaksin Shinawatra and the dissolution of the House in 2006.
- Yemen: General People's Congress, In power effectively from 1982 (1982–1990 sole legal party) to 2015, ceded effective control after Houthi takeover of Sana'a.

=== Africa ===
- Algeria: The National Liberation Front had governed Algeria from 1962 to 1992, from 1992 to 1994 (sole legal party 1962 to 1989), and from 1999 to 2019. The current president, Abdelmadjid Tebboune, is affiliated with FLN, but its partisan power is significantly weakened after the 2021 parliamentary elections.
- Botswana: The Botswana Democratic Party governed the country for 58 years with consecutive majority governments from independence in 1966 until 2024.
- Burkina Faso: The Congress for Democracy and Progress from 1996 to 2014, under Blaise Compaoré, who ruled first as an independent after a coup from 1987 to 1989, then led the Organization for Popular Democracy – Labour Movement from 1989 to 1996.
- Burundi: Union for National Progress (UPRONA) from 1962 to 1993 (from 1974 to 1992 as sole legal party).
- Central African Republic: the Movement for the Social Evolution of Black Africa ruled from 1960 to 1981 (from 1962 to 1980 as sole legal party).
- Egypt: The National Democratic Party (NDP) of Egypt, under various names, from 1952 to 2011 (as Arab Socialist Union, sole legal party 1953–1978)
- The Gambia: The People's Progressive Party in The Gambia from 1962 to 1994. The Alliance for Patriotic Reorientation and Construction under Yahya Jammeh from 1996 to 2017, with Jammeh ruling first under a Junta after a coup from 1994 to 1996.
- Gabon: The Gabonese Democratic Party governed from independence in 1960 to 2023, ended with the 2023 Gabonese coup.
- Guinea-Bissau: African Party for the Independence of Guinea and Cape Verde (PAIGC) governed from 1974 to 1999 (from 1974 to 1991 as the sole legal party).
- Ivory Coast: Democratic Party of Ivory Coast governed from 1960 to 1999 (from 1960 to 1990 as the sole legal party).
- Kenya: The Kenya African National Union in Kenya from 1963 to 2002 (sole legal party 1982–1991).
- Liberia: True Whig Party ruled consecutively from 1878 to 1980, in a de facto one-party state manner, though the country never explicitly banned opposition parties.
- Nigeria: People's Democratic Party (PDP) was in power from May 29, 1999, till May 29, 2015, when the opposition party All Progressives Congress (APC) won the presidential election in 2015.
- Rhodesia: The Rhodesian Front in Rhodesia (now Zimbabwe), under the leadership of Ian Smith, from 1965 to 1980.
- Senegal: The Socialist Party in Senegal from 1960 to 2000 (sole legal party 1966–1974).
- Seychelles: United Seychelles Party ruled from 1977 to 2020 (from 1977 to 1991 as sole legal party).
- Sierra Leone: The All People's Congress Party ruled from 1968 to 1992 (from 1978 to 1991 as sole legal party).
- South Africa: The National Party in South Africa from 1948 to 1994.
- Sudan: National Congress from 1998 to 2019 (1998 to 2005 as sole legal party).
- Tunisia: The Democratic Constitutional Rally in Tunisia, 1956–2011 (as the sole legal party between 1963 and 1981).
- Zambia: The Movement for Multiparty Democracy from 1991 to 2011.

=== Oceania ===
- Australia: The Liberal Party (generally in a near-permanent Coalition with the National Party) held power federally from 1949 to 1972 and from 1975 to 1983 (31 out of 34 years). After the expiry of the 46th Parliament in 2022, the Liberal-National Coalition held power for 20 out of the 26 years between 1996 and 2022. Overall from 1949 to 2022, the Liberal Party held power for 52 out of 73 years. The longest-serving Prime Minister was Robert Menzies, who served from 1939 to 1941 (2 years) as a member of the United Australia Party, and from 1949 to 1966 (16 years) as leader of the Liberal Party. The second longest-serving was John Howard (Liberal Party), who was Prime Minister from 1996-2007 (11 years).
  - Northern Territory: The Country Liberal Party held power from the granting of self-government in 1978 to 2001 (23 years).
  - New South Wales: The Labor Party held power from 1941 to 1965 (24 years), and from 1976 to 1988 and 1995 to 2011 (28 out of 35 years) – in total 52 out of 70 years from 1941 to 2011.
  - Queensland: The Labor Party held power from 1915 to 1929 and from 1932 to 1957 (39 out of 42 years). The National Party then held power from 1957 to 1989 (32 years) with and without the Liberal Party. These were facilitated by a Labor-designed malapportionment that favoured rural districts. The National Party under Joh Bjelke-Petersen increased the malapportionment with the Bjelkemander, allowing them to rule alone without the Liberals, and used the police to suppress dissent and opposition from Labor. The National Party dominance was ended by a corruption inquiry, Bjelke-Petersen was forced to resign in disgrace, and police and politicians were charged with crimes. Since 1989, Labor has held government aside from a National Party government (1996 to 1998) and Liberal-National Party government (2012 to 2015) (28 years of Labor government out of 33 years).
  - South Australia: The Liberal and Country League held power from 1933 to 1965 (32 years) through the Playmander. Since the ending of malapportionment after the 1968 election, the Labor Party has held power from 1970 to 1979, from 1982 to 1993, from 2002 to 2018 (26 out of 38 years), and has been in power since 2022.
  - Tasmania: The Labor Party held power from 1934 to 1969 and from 1972 to 1982 (45 out of 48 years), from 1989 to 1992, and from 1998 to 2014 (16 years) – in total 64 out of 80 years from 1934 to 2014.
  - Victoria: The National Citizens' Reform League (1902–1909), the Deakinite Liberal Party (1909–1917) and the Nationalist Party (1917–1924) consecutively held power from 1902 to 1924 (22 years). The Country Party then ruled from 1924 to 1927 (3 years), followed by the Nationalist Party from 1928 to 1929 (1 year) in a coalition. The Country Party and the United Australia Party (later as the Liberal and Country Party) held power with and without a coalition from 1932 to 1945 (13 years) and 1947 to 1952 (5 years). The Liberal Party then held power from 1955 to 1982 (27 years). In total, centre-right governments ruled 71 out of 80 years from 1902 to 1982.
  - Western Australia: The Liberal Party held power from 1947 to 1983 with two one-term interruptions between 1953 and 1956 and 1971 to 1974 (30 out of 36 years).
  - Australian Capital Territory: The Labor Party has held power since 2001 (23 years as of 2024) (in coalition with the ACT Greens since 2012), previously holding government between 1989 and 1995 (24 years out of 30 years since self-government).
- New Zealand: The Liberal Party governed from 1891 to 1912.
- Samoa: The Human Rights Protection Party governed from 1982 to 2021.

== See also ==
- One-party state
- Loyal opposition
- Multi-party system
- Party of power
- Separation of powers
- Soft despotism
- Two-party system
- Types of democracy
- Uniparty
