= Sierra, Abangares =

District in Abangares canton, Guanacaste province, Costa Rica

Sierra
- District
- Sierra district
- Sierra district location in Costa Rica
- Coordinates: 10.3269407°N 84.8925174°W
- Country: Costa Rica
- Province: Guanacaste
- Canton: Abangares

Area
  - Total: 112.01 km^{2} (43.25 sq mi)
- Elevation: 270 m (890 ft)

Population (2011)
  - Total: 2,351
  - Density: 20.99/km^{2} (54.36/sq mi)
- Time zone: UTC−06:00
- Postal code: 50702

Sierra, locally known as Las Minas (The Mines), is a district of the Abangares canton, in the Guanacaste province of Costa Rica. It is well known as a historical mining town of Costa Rica, located in the north west Pacific Region. It goes from an altitude of 210 meters to 1200 meters.

== History and mining ==
Oral history tells that the name "Sierra" is related to one of the first resources the town took advantage of: wood. The Spanish word "sierra" means "saw." Residents developed sawmills once they knew about the valuable and precious woods in the area.

By the year 1900, the gold mining industry had started up in Abangares but mostly in Sierra, were the Abangares Gold Fields of Costa Rica (Abangares Mining Company) owned by Minor C. Keith, built up the Stamp mill House, the Company Headquarters and the Powder House. The ore activity carried vast development. By that time, people compared La Sierra development with California (as well because the Gold rush).

== Climate ==
It is a mountainous zone with a variety of temperatures (from 34 °C to 5 °C) and climates (from dry forest to rain forest).

== Geography ==
Sierra has an area of 112.01 km^{2} and an elevation of 270 metres.

To the north it borders Tilarán, to the south San Juan de Abangares and Las Juntas (south west), to the east Monteverde and to the west it borders Cañas.

== Economy ==
The major activities are agriculture (Coffee and variety of Vegetable), Gold mining and Tourism. At the moment, gold mining is artisanal and largely unregulated.

Agriculture and mining are the most traditional activities and ways of living in the district. All over the highlands (San Rafael, Cebadilla, Campos de Oro, Cañitas, La Cruz and Tornos) small producers of coffee and vegetables are organized in cooperatives.

The Ecomuseum, the biodiversity, and the hot springs are attracting tourism from all over the world to the district. La Sierra is between Guanacaste and San José, and between Guanacaste and Monteverde. Tourism can include staying in La Sierra and using a non traditional tourist route to Guanacaste, with local options including zip lining, agritourism, visiting the Ecomuseum, seeking out local gold miners, or resting at the hot springs.

=== Mining ecomuseum ===
The Mining ecomuseum is located on 38 hectares of local government property and managed by the district Committee of Culture and Management of Museums. It documents and celebrates one of the first mining centers in Central America, and the legends and realities that the miners of the time lived in. The recent built showroom displays graphic and documentary information. Various paths explain the mining infrastructure, which preserves the spirit of the mining years (1901–1931).

The “Ecomuseum” idea arose in France in the 1970s. In Costa Rica it was adopted in the 1980s. The Abarenges Mine Ecomuseum was founded in 1991. It's an educational model of culture and sustainable development that integrates inhabitants with rational resource use, and ecological protection and cultural protection.

The Eco-museum was developed around the ruins of one of the oldest gold mines in the region, where old machinery, hand tools, and infrastructure can still be seen. The surrounding area is largely forested and provides opportunities for bird and butterfly watching, and other nature observation. It is a community organization that conserves and transmits local history, and strengthens the identity of the towns. In 2001, it was declared a Historical Architectonic Patrimony.

The Ecomuseum is in an area that holds evidence of the biggest scale of gold mining in Costa Rica, where the Company “Abangares Gold Fields of Costa Rica” operated. It contains an outdoor exhibition of mining machinery, paths that lead to the ruins of an old stamp mill house, “Edificio de los Mazos,” “Casa de la Pólvora,” and great natural scenery. There is a Tunnel on a historical traverse, where Tulita, a steam locomotive, pulled ore wagons.

== Villages ==
Sierra is composed of fifteen villages:

1. Aguas Claras
2. Alto Cebadilla
3. Campos de Oro
4. Candelaria
5. Cañitas
6. Cruz
7. Cuesta Yugo
8. Dos de Abangares
9. La Sierra
10. Marsellesa
11. San Antonio
12. San Rafael
13. Tornos
14. Tres Amigos
15. Turín (part)

== Demographics ==
Historical population
Census	Pop.	±% p.a.
1927	2,047	—
1950	1,947	−0.22%
1963	2,284	+1.24%
1973	1,760	−2.57%
1984	1,562	−1.08%
2000	2,248	+2.30%
2011	2,351	+0.41%
2022	2,687	+1.22%
Source: Instituto Nacional de Estadística y Censos; Centro Centroamericano de Población

For the 2011 census, Sierra had a population of 2,351.

== Transportation ==
=== Road transportation ===
The district is covered by the following road routes:

- National Route 145
- National Route 606
