= Abangares =

Abangares may refer to:

- Abangares (canton), in the Guanacaste province in Costa Rica
- Abangares River, a river in Costa Rica
