= Tendong =

Malaysian state constituency

Tendong (N11)
Kelantan constituency

State constituency
- Legislature: Kelantan State Legislative Assembly
MLA
Rozi Muhammad
PN
- Constituency created: 1959
- First contested: 1959
- Last contested: 2023

Demographics
- Electors (2023): 31,768

Tendong is a state constituency in Kelantan, Malaysia, that has been represented in the Kelantan State Legislative Assembly.

The state constituency was first contested in 1959 and is mandated to return a single Assemblyman to the Kelantan State Legislative Assembly under the first-past-the-post voting system.

== Demographics ==
As of 2020, Tendong has a population of 41,869 people.

Ethnic breakdown of Tendong's electorate as of 2023
1. Malay (97.8%)
2. Chinese (1.60%)
3. Other ethnicities (0.54%)
4. Indian (0.02%)

== History ==
=== Polling districts ===
According to the Gazette issued on 30 March 2018, the Tendong constituency has a total of 14 polling districts.

State Constituency	Polling Districts	Code	Location
Tendong (N11）	Pangkal Kala	022/11/01	SK Pangkal Kota
Tendong (N11）	Bechah Semak	022/11/02	SK Penggu
Tendong (N11）	Teliar	022/11/03	SMK Bunut Susu
Tendong (N11）	Bechah Menerong	022/11/04	SK Bunut Susu
Tendong (N11）	Bunut Susu	022/11/05	SK Bunut Susu
Tendong (N11）	Bechah Durian	022/11/06	SK Bechah Durian
Tendong (N11）	Padang Embon	022/11/07	SMA (Arab) Al-Ulum
Tendong (N11）	Kampung Paloh	022/11/08	SMK Tendong
Tendong (N11）	Hutan Chengal	022/11/09	Kolej Vokesional Pasir Mas
Tendong (N11）	Kubang Sepat	022/11/10	SK Tanjong Bunga
Tendong (N11）	Kampung Hutan Pasir	022/11/11	SMK Tanjong Bunga
Tendong (N11）	Tendong	022/11/12	SK Othman Talib (1)
Tendong (N11）	Kedondong	022/11/13	SMK Kedondong
Tendong (N11）	Kampung Chat	022/11/14	SK Gelang Mas

=== Representation history ===
Members of the Legislative Assembly for Tendong
Assembly	No	Years	Member	Party
Constituency created
1st	N08	1959–1964	Che Hassan	PMIP
2nd	N08	1964–1969	Che Hassan	PMIP
		1969-1971	Assembly was dissolved	
3rd	N08	1971–1973	Mohamed Nasir	PMIP
3rd	N08	1973-1974	Mohamed Nasir	BN (PMIP)
4th	N07	1974–1978	Mohamed Nasir	BN (PAS)
5th	N07	1978	Mohamed Nasir	BERJASA
5th	N07	1978–1982	Ghazali Awang Ibrahim	BERJASA
6th	N07	1982–1986	Abdul Ghani Mahmud	BN (BERJASA)
7th	N10	1986–1990	Ismail Che Mat	BN (UMNO)
8th	N10	1990–1995	Fadhil Mohamad Nor	S46
9th	N11	1995–1999	Hussin Ahmad	S46
10th	N11	1999–2004	Wan Othman Wan Yusoff	PAS
11th	N11	2004–2008	Mohd Fauzi Muhammad	BN (UMNO)
12th	N11	2008–2013	Muhammad Md Daud	PR (PAS)
13th	N11	2013–2018	Rozi Muhamad	PR (PAS)
14th	N11	2018–2020	Rozi Muhamad	PAS
14th	N11	2020–2023	Rozi Muhamad	PN (PAS)
15th	N11	2023–present	Rozi Muhamad	PN (PAS)

== Election results ==
Kelantan state election, 2023: Tendong
Party	Candidate	Votes	%	∆%
PAS	Rozi Muhammad	12,360	61.92	▲13.51
BN	Noor Hariri Mohamed Noor	6,514	32.64	▼3.60
Independent	Suzainal Adnan Sukri	1,086	5.44	▲5.44
Total valid votes		19,960	100.00	
Total rejected ballots		189		
Unreturned ballots		26		
Turnout		20,175	63.51	▼16.63
Registered electors		31,768		
Majority		5,846	29.28	▲17.11
PAS hold		Swing		

Kelantan state election, 2018: Tendong
Party	Candidate	Votes	%	∆%
PAS	Rozi Muhamad	8,951	48.41	▼4.33
BN	Yahaya Mamat	6,700	36.24	▼11.02
Independent	Ibrahim Ali	1,479	8.00	▲8.00
PKR	Wan Zulkhairi Wan Md Zain	1,360	7.36	▲7.36
Total valid votes		18,490	100.00	
Total rejected ballots		487		
Unreturned ballots		182		
Turnout		19,159	80.14	▼5.16
Registered electors		23,906		
Majority		2,251	12.17	▲6.69
PAS hold		Swing		

Kelantan state election, 2013: Tendong
Party	Candidate	Votes	%	∆%
PAS	Rozi Muhamad	9,397	52.74	▼2.95
BN	Hanafi Mamat	8,419	47.26	▲2.95
Total valid votes		17,816	100.00	
Total rejected ballots		267		
Unreturned ballots		65		
Turnout		18,148	85.30	▲1.92
Registered electors		21,281		
Majority		978	5.48	▼5.90
PAS hold		Swing		

Kelantan state election, 2008: Tendong
Party	Candidate	Votes	%	∆%
PAS	Muhammad Md Daud	8,105	55.69	▲8.74
BN	Mohd Fauzi Muhamad	6,448	44.31	▼8.74
Total valid votes		14,553	100.00	
Total rejected ballots		207		
Unreturned ballots		32		
Turnout		14,792	83.38	▲3.60
Registered electors		17,741		
Majority		1,657	11.38	▲5.28
PAS gain from BN		Swing		?

Kelantan state election, 2004: Tendong
Party	Candidate	Votes	%	∆%
BN	Mohd Fauzi Muhamad	6,852	53.05	▲11.49
PAS	Wan Othman Wan Yusoff	6,063	46.95	▼11.49
Total valid votes		12,915	100.00	
Total rejected ballots		269		
Unreturned ballots		0		
Turnout		13,184	79.78	▲0.61
Registered electors		16,525		
Majority		789	6.10	▼10.78
BN gain from PAS		Swing		?

Kelantan state election, 1999: Tendong
Party	Candidate	Votes	%	∆%
PAS	Wan Othman Wan Yusoff	6,930	58.44	▲58.44
BN	Fadhil Mohamad Nor	4,928	41.56	▼5.75
Total valid votes		11,858	100.00	
Total rejected ballots		253		
Unreturned ballots		1		
Turnout		12,112	79.17	▲1.58
Registered electors		15,298		
Majority		2,002	16.88	▲11.50
PAS gain from S46		Swing		?

Kelantan state election, 1995: Tendong
Party	Candidate	Votes	%	∆%
S46	Hussin Ahmad	5,755	52.69	▼10.56
BN	Mohd Yaman Muhamad	5,168	47.31	▲10.56
Total valid votes		10,923	100.00	
Total rejected ballots		253		
Unreturned ballots		32		
Turnout		11,208	77.59	▼2.13
Registered electors		14,446		
Majority		587	5.38	▼21.12
S46 hold		Swing		

Kelantan state election, 1990: Tendong
Party	Candidate	Votes	%	∆%
S46	Fadhil Mohamad Nor	6,607	63.25	▲63.25
BN	Ismail Che Mat	3,839	36.75	▼24.99
Total valid votes		10,446	100.00	
Total rejected ballots		322		
Unreturned ballots		0		
Turnout		10,768	79.72	▲2.36
Registered electors		13,507		
Majority		2,768	26.50	▲3.02
S46 gain from BN		Swing		?

Kelantan state election, 1986: Tendong
Party	Candidate	Votes	%	∆%
BN	Ismail Che Mat	5,589	61.74	▲4.51
PAS	Ab Kadir Hassan	3,463	38.26	▼4.51
Total valid votes		9,052	100.00	
Total rejected ballots		343		
Unreturned ballots		0		
Turnout		9,395	77.36	▼3.22
Registered electors		12,144		
Majority		2,126	23.48	▲9.01
BN hold		Swing		

Kelantan state election, 1982: Tendong
Party	Candidate	Votes	%	∆%
BN	Abd Ghani Mahmood	5,805	57.24	▲57.24
PAS	Zakaria Ismail	4,337	42.76	▲14.27
Total valid votes		10,142	100.00	
Total rejected ballots		251		
Unreturned ballots		0		
Turnout		10,393	80.58	▲4.44
Registered electors		12,898		
Majority		1,468	14.47	▼28.54
BN gain from Pan-Malaysian Islamic Front		Swing		-

Kelantan state by-election, 10 June 1978: Tendong Resignation on appointment as Senator of the incumbent, Mohamed Nasir
Party	Candidate	Votes	%	∆%
Pan-Malaysian Islamic Front	Ghazali Awang Ibrahim	5,951	71.51	▼6.41
PAS	Saharun Ibrahim	2,371	28.49	▲6.41
Total valid votes		8,322	100.00	
Total rejected ballots		123		
Unreturned ballots		0		
Turnout		8,445	76.14	▲0.16
Registered electors		11,091		
Majority		3,580	43.02	▼12.83
Pan-Malaysian Islamic Front hold		Swing		

Kelantan state election, 1978: Tendong
Party	Candidate	Votes	%	∆%
Pan-Malaysian Islamic Front	Mohamed Nasir	6,180	77.92	▲77.92
PAS	Saharun Ibrahim	1,751	22.08	▼59.46
Total valid votes		7,931	100.00	
Total rejected ballots		148		
Unreturned ballots		0		
Turnout		8,079	75.99	▲2.57
Registered electors		10,632		
Majority		4,429	55.84	▼16.30
Pan-Malaysian Islamic Front gain from BN		Swing		-

Kelantan state election, 1974: Tendong
Party	Candidate	Votes	%	∆%
BN	Mohamed Nasir	5,708	81.54	▲26.24
Independent	Abdul Aziz Abdullah	658	9.40	▲9.40
Parti Rakyat Malaysia	Yusoff Ismail	634	9.06	▲9.06
Total valid votes		7,000	100.00	
Total rejected ballots		668		
Unreturned ballots		0		
Turnout		7,668	73.41	▼1.88
Registered electors		10,445		
Majority		5,050	72.14	▲61.53
BN gain from PMIP		Swing		-

Kelantan state election, 1969: Tendong
Party	Candidate	Votes	%	∆%
PMIP	Mohamed Nasir	3,878	55.31	▼10.99
Alliance	Mohamad Nor Abdullah	3,134	44.69	▲10.99
Total valid votes		7,012	100.00	
Total rejected ballots		386		
Unreturned ballots		0		
Turnout		7,398	75.30	▼5.67
Registered electors		9,825		
Majority		744	10.61	▼21.98
PMIP hold		Swing		

Kelantan state election, 1964: Tendong
Party	Candidate	Votes	%	∆%
PMIP	Che Hassan Ismail	4,416	66.30	▼3.24
Alliance	Ja'afar Idris	2,245	33.70	▲15.38
Total valid votes		6,661	100.00	
Total rejected ballots		250		
Unreturned ballots		0		
Turnout		6,911	80.96	▲2.23
Registered electors		8,536		
Majority		2,171	32.59	▼18.62
PMIP hold		Swing		

Kelantan state election, 1959: Tendong
Party	Candidate	Votes	%
PMIP	Che Hassan Ismail	4,075	69.54
Alliance	Mohd. Zain Harun	1,074	18.33
Socialist Front	Mat Noor Yusoff	251	4.28
Independent	Abdullah Tempoyak	238	4.06
Independent	Harun	222	3.79
Total valid votes		5,860	100.00
Total rejected ballots		81	
Unreturned ballots		0	
Turnout		5,941	78.73
Registered electors		7,546	
Majority		3,001	51.21
This was a new constituency created.
