= Mohamed Nasir =

Malaysian politician

Yang Berbahagia Dato' Biji Sura Dato' Mohamed Nasir SPMK DPMK JMN JP
- محمد ناصر
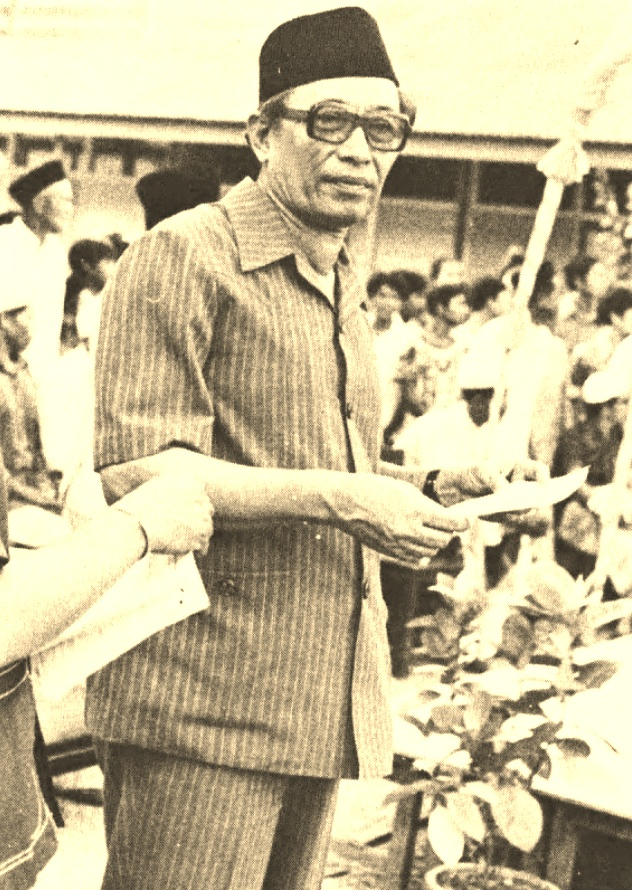
- Also known as: Datuak Intan Maradjo

Menteri Besar of Kelantan
- In office 1973–1978
- Monarch: Yahya Petra
- Preceded by: Asri Muda
- Succeeded by: Mohamed Yaacob
- Constituency: Tendong

Minister without Portfolio
- In office 1978–1984
- Prime Minister: Hussein Onn; Mahathir Mohamad
- Constituency: Senator

Member of the Kelantan State Legislative Assembly for N07 Tendong
- In office 10 May 1969 – 19 April 1978
- Preceded by: Che Hassan (PMIP)
- Succeeded by: Ghazali Awang Ibrahim (BERJASA-BN)

Member of the Kelantan State Legislative Assembly for N25 Machang Utara
- In office 24 June 1959 – 25 April 1964
- Preceded by: Constituency created
- Succeeded by: Mohyiddin @ Che Kadir Che Tengah (UMNO-Alliance)

President of the Pan-Malaysian Islamic Front (BERJASA)
- In office 1977–1982
- Preceded by: Party established
- Succeeded by: Wan Hashim Wan Ahmad

Personal details
- Born: Mohamed bin Nasir; 1916 Kampung Padang Enggang, Kota Bharu, Kelantan, Unfederated Malay States, British Malaya (now Malaysia)
- Died: 21 February 1997 (aged 81) Melbourne, Victoria, Australia
- Resting place: Northern Memorial Park Cemetery, Melbourne, Victoria, Australia
- Party: PAS (until 1977); BERJASA (1977–unknown)
- Spouse(s): Wan Mariam Wan Yusoff (former); Datin Che Zainab Che Ismail; Nik Khamsiah Nik Mohamed
- Children: 16
- Profession: Menteri Besar of Kelantan
- Known for: Menteri Besar during 1977 Kelantan Emergency

Mohamed bin Nasir (Jawi: محمد بن ناصر; 1916 – 21 February 1997) was a Malaysian politician. He served as the Menteri Besar (Chief Minister) of Kelantan from 1973 to 1978.

Mohamed founded Pan-Malaysian Islamic Front (BERJASA) in 1977 under the persuasion and endorsement of United Malays National Organisation (UMNO) who were dissatisfied with the demands of and in squabbles for the lump share in controlling the Barisan Nasional (BN) state of Kelantan with the Pan-Malaysian Islamic Party (PAS).

== Early life ==
Mohamed Nasir was born in 1916 in Kampung Kota, Kota Bharu. His grandmother Malin Padek was from West Sumatra. He had a total of 16 children as a result of his polygamous marriages with Che Zainab binti Haji Ismail, Wan Mariam binti Wan Yusoff and Nik Khamsiah binti Nik Mohamed. He was educated at the Kelantan Islamic Religious Council School, Royal English School, Kuala Krai. He obtained his Diploma in Agriculture in 1937 from Serdang Agricultural College. He continued his studies by learning the Quran and Hadith from Maulana Ahmad Ali Lahore and Maulana Mohamed Shah. Then, he led the preaching movement throughout Kelantan.

== Political career ==
In 1959, Mohamed Nasir started his active politics with PAS and was appointed as Deputy Chief Minister of Kelantan. The 2nd Malaysian Prime Minister, Tun Abdul Razak invited PAS to join the Barisan Nasional after the 13 May incident, which were accepted by PAS in 1973. After winning the 1974 General Election, he was given a mandate by Barisan Nasional to lead the administration of Kelantan until he was ousted by his fellow PAS state assemblymen in a vote of no confidence during the State Assembly meeting in October 1977, because of his leaning towards BN than PAS. This resulted in Nasir's supporters protesting on the streets, leading to the 1977 Kelantan Emergency. Subsequently, Nasir were sacked by PAS, and PAS were also kicked out of BN. Nasir and his supporters later formed Berjasa Party.

After the lifting of the Emergency in February 1978 and subsequently the snap elections of Kelantan in March 1978, which BN won with support of Berjasa, Nasir were replaced by Mohamed Yaacob from BN-UMNO as Menteri Besar. In April 1978, he were appointed as a Senator in Dewan Negara, representing the Kelantan Government, and subsequently were appointed as Minister of Public Enterprises. He later were appointed as Minister without Portfolio in the leadership of the Barisan Nasional government from 1978 to 1982, when Berjasa were admitted to BN after the 1978 Malaysian general election. After the 1982 Malaysian general election, Nasir would relinquish his party presidency, with his deputy Wan Hashim Wan Ahmad succeeding him.

Apart from leading the Berjasa Party, he was also active in voluntary service such as being President of Perkim Kelantan, President of Kelantan Former Soldiers, President of JP Kelantan, Founder of Balaghulmubin Religious School, Patron of Kelantan Indian Muslim Association and Founder of Kelantan Islamic Higher Education Center.

== Death ==
Mohamed Nasir died in Melbourne Hospital, Melbourne, Australia, on Friday, 21 February 1997 at 1.45 pm due to old age and was buried in Northern Memorial Park Cemetery, Melbourne, Victoria, Australia.

== Honours ==
- Malaysia
  - Companion of the Order of the Defender of the Realm (JMN) (1974)
- Kelantan
  - Dato' Biji Sura (1963)
  - Justice of Peace (JP) (1964)
  - Knight Commander of the Order of the Crown of Kelantan (DPMK) – Dato' (1968)
  - Knight Grand Commander of the Order of the Crown of Kelantan (SPMK) – Dato' (1975)

== See also ==
- 1977 Kelantan Emergency

Political offices
Preceded by Asri Muda	Menteri Besar of Kelantan; 1973–1978	Succeeded by Mohamed Yaacob
