= 1978 Malaysian general election =

- 8–22 July 1978

All 154 seats in the Dewan Rakyat 78 seats needed for a majority
- Registered: 5,059,702
- Turnout: 75.30%

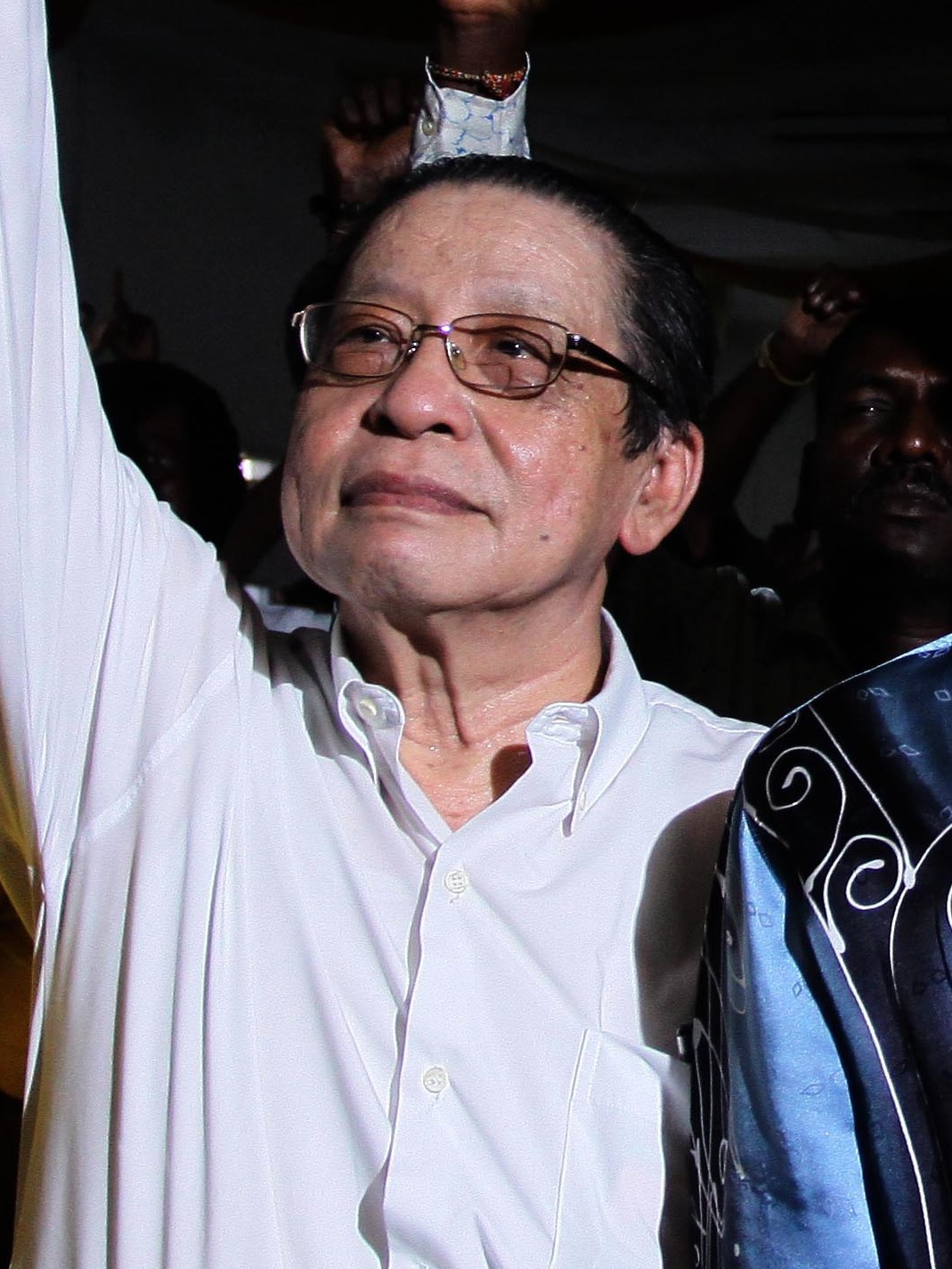

	First party	Second party	Third party
Leader	Hussein Onn	Lim Kit Siang	Asri Muda
Party	BN	DAP	PAS
Last election	124 seats (Note: Excluding seats for PAS, who was a member of Barisan Nasional in 1974 elections but were ousted from BN before the 1978 elections.)	18.32%, 9 seats	14 seats (Note: As a member of Barisan Nasional in 1974 elections.)
Seats won	130	16	5
Seat change	▼5	▲7	▼8
Popular vote	1,987,907	664,433	537,720
Percentage	57.23%	19.13%	15.48%
Swing	▼3.58pp	▲0.81pp	–
Prime Minister before election
Hussein Onn
BN
Prime Minister-designate
Hussein Onn
BN

General elections were held in Malaysia between Saturday, 8 July and Saturday, 22 July 1978. Voting took place in all 154 parliamentary constituencies, each electing one Member of Parliament to the Dewan Rakyat, the dominant house of Parliament. State elections also took place in 276 state constituencies (except Kelantan, Sabah and Sarawak) on the same day.

It was Hussein Onn's first election after becoming the country's third Prime Minister in 1976. His Barisan Nasional alliance emerged victorious with 130 of the 154 seats. Voter turnout was 75%.

== Results ==
As expected, Barisan Nasional comfortably maintained its majority in the Malaysian Parliament and thus, gave the Prime Minister the power to form a government with a free hand. Despite the victory, BN actually lost further five seats out of 154 seats to the opposition.

The Pan-Malaysian Islamic Party (PAS) withdrew from BN in the midst of the 1977 Kelantan Emergency over disagreements with UMNO over the running of the state government of Kelantan, which PAS had controlled since the first post-independence general election in 1959. With the support of UMNO, detractors within PAS split with the party and formed the Pan-Malaysian Islamic Front (BERJASA). In the election, PAS lost the control of the state for the first time to the UMNO-BERJASA alliance within BN and keeping administration by BN for 12 years until 1990. Tengku Razaleigh Hamzah has been credited for UMNO's victory in Kelantan.

The opposition garnered 42.8% of total votes. In spite of that, the opposition as one won only 24 seats. Democratic Action Party won the largest slice of the pie among the opposition parties and hence, its leader Lim Kit Siang retained his position as the leader of the opposition that he had obtained four years earlier.

Candidates were returned unopposed in nine constituencies. The registered electors from these constituencies therefore did not cast ballots.

Party or alliance		Votes	%	Seats	+/–
Barisan Nasional	United Malays National Organisation	1,089,402	31.36	69	+7
Barisan Nasional	Malaysian Chinese Association	451,307	12.99	17	–2
Barisan Nasional	Sabah People's United Front	61,522	1.77	8	New
Barisan Nasional	Sarawak National Party	45,218	1.30	9	0
Barisan Nasional	Parti Pesaka Bumiputera Bersatu	52,222	1.50	8	0
Barisan Nasional	Sarawak United Peoples' Party	64,099	1.85	6	–1
Barisan Nasional	United Sabah National Organisation	32,703	0.94	5	–8
Barisan Nasional	Parti Gerakan Rakyat Malaysia	98,217	2.83	4	–1
Barisan Nasional	Malaysian Indian Congress	67,119	1.93	3	–1
Barisan Nasional	People's Progressive Party	9,204	0.26	0	–1
Barisan Nasional	Direct Candidate	16,894	0.49	1	–
Barisan Nasional	Total	1,987,907	57.23	130	–5
Democratic Action Party		664,433	19.13	16	+7
Pan-Malaysian Islamic Party		537,720	15.48	5	–8
Parti Anak Jati Sarawak		35,009	1.01	0	New
Malaysian Social Justice Party		23,792	0.68	0	–1
Parti Sosialis Rakyat Malaysia		22,031	0.63	0	0
Social Democratic Party		13,788	0.40	0	New
Sarawak People's Organisation		10,150	0.29	1	New
Social United Association Party		5,594	0.16	0	New
Sabah Democratic People's Party		4,491	0.13	0	New
Parti Umat Sarawak		3,898	0.11	0	New
Malaysian Workers' Party		1,731	0.05	0	New
Sabah Chinese Association		1,305	0.04	0	–3
Sarawak People's National Party		861	0.02	0	New
Homeland Consciousness Union		350	0.01	0	0
Independents		160,370	4.62	2	+2
Total		3,473,430	100.00	154	0
Valid votes		3,473,430	96.57		
Invalid/blank votes		123,302	3.43		
Total votes		3,596,732	100.00		
Registered voters/turnout		4,776,391	75.30		
Source: Nohlen et al. CLEA, Thambipillai Tindak Malaysia Github

The above registered voter turnout refers to total electorate for the contested constituencies. The total electorate for whole of Malaysia including 9 uncontested constituencies is 5,0659,702.

=== By state ===
==== Johore ====
Party or alliance		Votes	%	Seats	+/–
Barisan Nasional	United Malays National Organisation	226,636	53.06	11	0
Barisan Nasional	Malaysian Chinese Association	103,597	24.25	4	-1
Barisan Nasional	Total	330,233	77.31	15	-1
Democratic Action Party		64,385	15.07	1	+1
Pan-Malaysian Islamic Party		32,512	7.61	0	0
Total		427,130	100.00	16	0
Valid votes		427,130	95.90		
Invalid/blank votes		18,283	4.10		
Total votes		445,413	100.00		
Registered voters/turnout		572,447	77.81		

Total Electors for Johor is 614605 voters. The above table shows the total voters of contested constituencies and there is only one uncontested seat in Johor - Batu Pahat

==== Kedah ====
Party or alliance		Votes	%	Seats	+/–
Barisan Nasional	United Malays National Organisation	168,666	48.68	9	+1
Barisan Nasional	Malaysian Chinese Association	29,199	8.43	2	0
Barisan Nasional	Total	197,865	57.10	11	+1
Pan-Malaysian Islamic Party		137,400	39.65	2	-1
Democratic Action Party		2,828	0.82	0	0
Independents		8,410	2.43	0	0
Total		346,503	100.00	13	0
Valid votes		346,503	97.17		
Invalid/blank votes		10,099	2.83		
Total votes		356,602	100.00		
Registered voters/turnout		461,290	77.31		

==== Kelantan ====
Party or alliance		Votes	%	Seats	+/–
Barisan Nasional	United Malays National Organisation	143,161	56.41	10	+5
Pan-Malaysian Islamic Party		110,620	43.59	2	-5
Total		253,781	100.00	12	0
Valid votes		253,781	98.99		
Invalid/blank votes		2,600	1.01		
Total votes		256,381	100.00		
Registered voters/turnout		340,141	75.37		

==== Kuala Lumpur ====
Party or alliance		Votes	%	Seats	+/–
Democratic Action Party		101,306	54.98	3	+1
Barisan Nasional	Parti Gerakan Rakyat Malaysia	20,055	10.88	1	+1
Barisan Nasional	Malaysian Indian Congress	18,239	9.90	0	–1
Barisan Nasional	Malaysian Chinese Association	7,853	4.26	0	0
Barisan Nasional	United Malays National Organisation			1	0
Barisan Nasional	Total	46,147	25.05	2	0
Malaysian Social Justice Party		17,988	9.76	0	–1
Pan-Malaysian Islamic Party		12,006	6.52	0	0
Malaysian Workers' Party		1,731	0.94	0	New
Independents		5,072	2.75	0	0
Total		184,250	100.00	5	0
Valid votes		184,250	98.97		
Invalid/blank votes		1,910	1.03		
Total votes		186,160	100.00		
Registered voters/turnout		261,783	71.11		

Total Electors of Kuala Lumpur is 328216. The above table shows total number of voters for contested constituencies. There was one uncontested seat - Setapak (won by UMNO)

==== Malacca ====
Party or alliance		Votes	%	Seats	+/–
Barisan Nasional	United Malays National Organisation	41,344	38.89	2	0
Barisan Nasional	Malaysian Chinese Association	17,844	16.79	1	0
Barisan Nasional	Total	59,188	55.68	3	0
Democratic Action Party		34,576	32.53	1	0
Pan-Malaysian Islamic Party		12,536	11.79	0	0
Total		106,300	100.00	4	0
Valid votes		106,300	96.00		
Invalid/blank votes		4,428	4.00		
Total votes		110,728	100.00		
Registered voters/turnout		141,841	78.06		

Total Electors of Malacca is 188022. The above table shows total number of voters for contested constituencies. There was one uncontested seat - Batu Berendam

==== Negeri Sembilan ====
Party or alliance		Votes	%	Seats	+/–
Barisan Nasional	United Malays National Organisation	36,443	25.70	3	0
Barisan Nasional	Malaysian Chinese Association	30,707	21.66	1	0
Barisan Nasional	Malaysian Indian Congress	14,521	10.24	1	0
Barisan Nasional	Total	81,671	57.61	5	0
Democratic Action Party		41,736	29.44	1	0
Pan-Malaysian Islamic Party		11,217	7.91	0	0
Independents		7,151	5.04	0	0
Total		141,775	100.00	6	0
Valid votes		141,775	95.36		
Invalid/blank votes		6,906	4.64		
Total votes		148,681	100.00		
Registered voters/turnout		190,409	78.09		

Total Electors of Negeri Sembilan is 221815. The above table shows total number of voters for contest constituencies. There was one uncontested seat - Jelebu

==== Pahang ====
Party or alliance		Votes	%	Seats	+/–
Barisan Nasional	United Malays National Organisation	95,576	51.68	6	-1
Barisan Nasional	Malaysian Chinese Association	28,017	15.15	2	+1
Barisan Nasional	Total	123,593	66.83	8	0
Pan-Malaysian Islamic Party		34,156	18.47	0	0
Democratic Action Party		16,354	8.84	0	0
Parti Sosialis Rakyat Malaysia		6,441	3.48	0	0
Independents		4,384	2.37	0	0
Total		184,928	100.00	8	0
Valid votes		184,928	95.21		
Invalid/blank votes		9,297	4.79		
Total votes		194,225	100.00		
Registered voters/turnout		258,024	75.27		

==== Penang ====
Party or alliance		Votes	%	Seats	+/–
Barisan Nasional	United Malays National Organisation	42,271	14.42	2	-1
Barisan Nasional	Malaysian Chinese Association	51,428	17.54	1	-2
Barisan Nasional	Parti Gerakan Rakyat Malaysia	44,474	15.17	1	-2
Barisan Nasional	Total	138,173	47.12	4	-5
Democratic Action Party		79,918	27.26	4	+4
Pan-Malaysian Islamic Party		31,667	10.80	1	+1
Parti Sosialis Rakyat Malaysia		10,044	3.43	0	0
Social Democratic Party		13,788	4.70	0	0
Homeland Consciousness Union		350	0.12	0	0
Independents		19,280	6.58	0	0
Total		293,220	100.00	9	0
Valid votes		293,220	96.60		
Invalid/blank votes		10,321	3.40		
Total votes		303,541	100.00		
Registered voters/turnout		383,134	79.23		

==== Perak ====
Party or alliance		Votes	%	Seats	+/–
Barisan Nasional	United Malays National Organisation	121,755	22.19	10	-1
Barisan Nasional	Malaysian Chinese Association	99,092	18.06	3	+1
Barisan Nasional	Parti Gerakan Rakyat Malaysia	33,638	6.13	2	0
Barisan Nasional	Malaysian Indian Congress	12,930	2.36	1	0
Barisan Nasional	Direct Candidate	16,894	3.08	1	0
Barisan Nasional	People's Progressive Party	9,204	1.68	0	-1
Barisan Nasional	Total	293,563	53.51	17	-1
Democratic Action Party		200,547	36.55	4	0
Pan-Malaysian Islamic Party		52,655	9.60	0	-1
Malaysian Social Justice Party		342	0.06	0	0
Independents		1,564	0.29	0	0
Total		548,621	100.00	21	0
Valid votes		548,621	96.29		
Invalid/blank votes		21,127	3.71		
Total votes		569,748	100.00		
Registered voters/turnout		736,963	77.31		

==== Perlis ====
Party or alliance		Votes	%	Seats	+/–
Barisan Nasional	United Malays National Organisation	30,762	60.75	2	0
Pan-Malaysian Islamic Party		16,973	33.52	0	0
Independents		2,906	5.74	0	0
Total		50,641	100.00	2	0
Valid votes		50,641	95.78		
Invalid/blank votes		2,232	4.22		
Total votes		52,873	100.00		
Registered voters/turnout		68,572	77.11		

==== Sabah ====
Party or alliance		Votes	%	Seats	+/–
Barisan Nasional	Sabah People's United Front	61,522	33.84	8	New
Barisan Nasional	United Sabah National Organisation	32,703	17.99	5	–8
Barisan Nasional	Total	94,225	51.83	14	-8
Democratic Action Party		11,733	6.45	1	+1
Social United Association Party		5,594	3.08	0	New
Sabah Democratic People's Party		4,491	2.47	0	New
Sabah Chinese Association		1,305	0.72	0	–3
Malaysian Social Justice Party		921	0.51	0	0
Independents		63,515	34.94	2	+2
Total		181,784	100.00	16	0
Valid votes		181,784	96.97		
Invalid/blank votes		5,685	3.03		
Total votes		187,469	100.00		
Registered voters/turnout		282,369	66.39		

Total Electorate of Sabah is 295580. The above table shows the registered voter count of contested constituency and there is one uncontested constituency - Ulu Padas

==== Sarawak ====
Party or alliance		Votes	%	Seats	+/–
Barisan Nasional	Parti Pesaka Bumiputera Bersatu	52,222	20.38	8	0
Barisan Nasional	Sarawak National Party	45,218	17.64	9	0
Barisan Nasional	Sarawak United Peoples' Party	64,099	25.01	6	-1
Barisan Nasional	Total	161,539	63.03	23	-1
Parti Anak Jati Sarawak		35,009	13.66	0	New
Sarawak People's Organisation		10,150	3.96	1	New
Parti Umat Sarawak		3,898	1.52	0	New
Sarawak People's National Party		861	0.34	0	New
Independents		44,831	17.49	0	0
Total		256,288	100.00	24	0
Valid votes		256,288	96.45		
Invalid/blank votes		9,424	3.55		
Total votes		265,712	100.00		
Registered voters/turnout		385,345	68.95		

Total Electors of Sarawak is 440276. The above table shows the registered voter count of contested constituency and there are three uncontested constituencies - Padawan, Baram and Bukit Mas

==== Selangor ====
Party or alliance		Votes	%	Seats	+/–
Barisan Nasional	United Malays National Organisation	107,066	29.06	6	+1
Barisan Nasional	Malaysian Chinese Association	83,570	22.68	3	-1
Barisan Nasional	Malaysian Indian Congress	21,429	5.82	1	0
Barisan Nasional	Total	212,565	57.69	10	0
Democratic Action Party		111,050	30.14	1	0
Pan-Malaysian Islamic Party		36,615	9.94	0	0
Malaysian Social Justice Party		4,541	1.23	0	0
Parti Sosialis Rakyat Malaysia		902	0.24	0	0
Independents		3,257	0.88	0	0
Total		368,430	100.00	11	0
Valid votes		368,430	96.18		
Invalid/blank votes		14,623	3.82		
Total votes		383,053	100.00		
Registered voters/turnout		515,497	74.31		

==== Trengganu ====
Party or alliance		Votes	%	Seats	+/–
Barisan Nasional	United Malays National Organisation	75,722	58.37	7	+3
Pan-Malaysian Islamic Party		49,363	38.05	0	-3
Parti Sosialis Rakyat Malaysia		4,644	3.58	0	0
Total		129,729	100.00	7	0
Valid votes		129,729	95.32		
Invalid/blank votes		6,367	4.68		
Total votes		136,096	100.00		
Registered voters/turnout		178,576	76.21		

Total electors is 207267. The above table shows the registered voters for contested constituencies and there is one uncontested constituency - Kuala Nerus

== See also ==
- 1978 Malaysian state elections
