= National Route 133 (Costa Rica) =

National Road Route in Costa Rica

National Secondary Route 133
- Ruta nacional secundaria 133

Route information
- Maintained by Ministry of Public Works and Transport
- Length: 4.860 km (3.020 mi)

Location
- Country: Costa Rica
- Provinces: Guanacaste

Highway system
- National Road Network of Costa Rica
← Route 132	→ Route 134

National Secondary Route 133, or just Route 133 (Spanish: Ruta Nacional Secundaria 133, or Ruta 133) is a National Road Route of Costa Rica located in the Guanacaste province.

== Description ==
In Guanacaste province the route covers Abangares canton (Colorado district).
