= Colorado District =

District in Guanacaste province, Costa Rica

Colorado
- District
- Interactive map of Colorado
- Colorado district location in Costa Rica
- Coordinates: 10.2132561°N 85.1256356°W
- Country: Costa Rica
- Province: Guanacaste
- Canton: Abangares
- Creation: 24 April 1970

Area
  - Total: 201.04 km^{2} (77.62 sq mi)
- Elevation: 18 m (59 ft)

Population (2011)
  - Total: 4,621
  - Density: 22.99/km^{2} (59.53/sq mi)
- Time zone: UTC−06:00
- Postal code: 50704

Colorado is a district of the Abangares canton, in the Guanacaste province of Costa Rica.

== History ==
Colorado was created on 24 April, 1970 by Decreto 23, crea consejo distrital.

== Geography ==
Colorado has an area of 201.04 km^{2} (77.62 sq mi) and an elevation of 18 metres.

== Villages ==
The administrative center of the district is the town of Colorado.

Other villages are Barbudal, Gavilanes, Higuerilla, Huacas (partly), Monte Potrero, Quebracho, Peñablanca, San Buenaventura, San Joaquín, Solimar, and Villafuerte.

== Demographics ==
Historical population
Census	Pop.	±% p.a.
1892	641	—
1927	600	−0.19%
1950	1,154	+2.88%
1963	1,859	+3.74%
1973	2,792	+4.15%
1984	2,970	+0.56%
2000	4,076	+2.00%
2011	4,621	+1.15%
2022	6,552	+3.23%
Source: Instituto Nacional de Estadística y Censos; Centro Centroamericano de Población

For the 2011 census, Colorado had a population of 4,621 inhabitants.

== Transportation ==
=== Road transportation ===
The district is covered by the following road routes:

- National Route 18
- National Route 133
- National Route 601
