= Abangares (canton) =

Canton in Guanacaste province, Costa Rica

- Canton
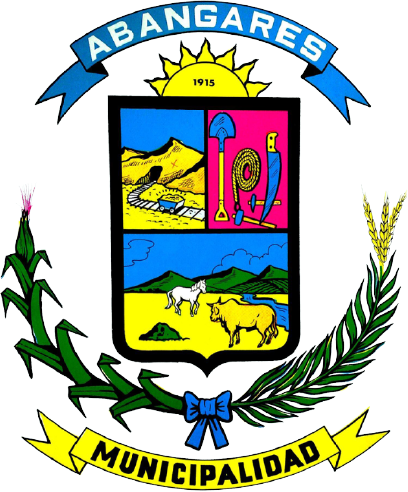
- Flag Seal
- Interactive map of Abangares
- Abangares canton location in Costa Rica
- Coordinates: 10.249165°N 85.0268119°W
- Country: Costa Rica
- Province: Guanacaste
- Creation: 4 June 1915
- Head city: Las Juntas
- Districts: Districts: Las Juntas; Sierra; San Juan; Colorado

Government
  - Type: Municipality
  - Body: Municipalidad de Abangares

Area
  - Total: 675.76 km^{2} (260.91 sq mi)
- Elevation: 154 m (505 ft)

Population (2011)
  - Total: 18,039
  - Density: 26.694/km^{2} (69.138/sq mi)
- Time zone: UTC−06:00
- Canton code: 507
- Website: www.abangares.go.cr

Abangares is a canton in the Guanacaste province of Costa Rica. The head city is in Las Juntas district.

== History ==
Abangares was created on 4 June, 1915 by decree 13.

== Geography ==
Abangares has an area of 675.76 km^{2} and a mean elevation of 154 metres. The canton begins on the coastline of the Gulf of Nicoya north of the mouth of the Abangares River. It widens between the Lajas River on the northwest and Lagarto River on the east as it reaches up into the Cordillera de Tilarán.

== Districts ==
The canton of Abangares is subdivided into the following districts:

1. Las Juntas
2. Sierra
3. San Juan
4. Colorado

== Demographics ==
Historical population
Census	Pop.	±% p.a.
1927	5,540	—
1950	8,344	+1.80%
1963	10,189	+1.55%
1973	11,633	+1.33%
1984	12,575	+0.71%
2000	16,276	+1.63%
2011	18,039	+0.94%
2022	22,211	+1.91%
Source: Instituto Nacional de Estadística y Censos; Centro Centroamericano de Población

For the 2011 census, Abangares had a population of 18,039 inhabitants.

== Transportation ==
=== Road transportation ===
The canton is covered by the following road routes:

- National Route 1
- National Route 18
- National Route 133
- National Route 145
- National Route 601
- National Route 602
- National Route 606

== Gold mines ==
The Abangares canton is home to the oldest gold mining tradition in Costa Rica, dating back over a century. The first major mining operation was Abangares Mining Company, founded in the Tilarán mountains by U.S. railroad, fruit, and shipping magnate Minor C. Keith.

One of the canton's major modern producers of gold, with silver as a by-product, has been the Tres Hermanos mine, which for many years was operated by El Valiente Ascari S.A., a subsidiary of Ariel Resources Ltd. of Vancouver, British Columbia, Canada. That company filed for insolvency in 2001 and abandoned the operation while still owing its workers two months worth of wages. More than 300 families continue to earn a meager living working through an independent local collective that now operates the mine.

A mining museum at La Sierra de Abangares with artifacts from the boom times of Costa Rican gold mining is a major tourist attraction of the canton.
