= San Juan District, Abangares =

District in Abangares canton, Guanacaste province, Costa Rica

San Juan
- District
- San Juan district
- San Juan district location in Costa Rica
- Coordinates: 10.2228926°N 84.9310158°W
- Country: Costa Rica
- Province: Guanacaste
- Canton: Abangares

Area
  - Total: 107.46 km^{2} (41.49 sq mi)
- Elevation: 179 m (587 ft)

Population (2011)
  - Total: 1,585
  - Density: 14.75/km^{2} (38.20/sq mi)
- Time zone: UTC−06:00
- Postal code: 50703

San Juan is a district of the Abangares canton, in the Guanacaste province of Costa Rica.

== Geography ==
San Juan has an area of 107.46 km^{2} (41.49 sq mi) and an elevation of 179 metres.

== Villages ==
Administrative center of the district is the village of San Juan Grande.

Other villages are Arizona, Congo, Nancital, Portones, Pozo Azul Rancho Alegre (partly), Rancho Ania (partly), Tierra Colorada and Vainilla.

== Demographics ==
Historical population
Census	Pop.	±% p.a.
1927	962	—
1950	1,812	+2.79%
1963	1,793	−0.08%
1973	1,595	−1.16%
1984	1,475	−0.71%
2000	1,340	−0.60%
2011	1,585	+1.54%
2022	1,637	+0.29%
Source: Instituto Nacional de Estadística y Censos; Centro Centroamericano de Población

For the 2011 census, San Juan had a population of 1,585.

== Transportation ==
=== Road transportation ===
The district is covered by the following road routes:

- National Route 1
