= Santo Domingo Canton =

Santo Domingo Canton may refer to:

- Santo Domingo (canton), Costa Rica
- Santo Domingo Canton (Ecuador)
