= Lagarto River =

River in Costa Rica

Lagarto River Rio Lagarto
- Location of mouth

Location
- Country: Costa Rica

Physical characteristics
- Mouth
  - coordinates: 10°03′23″N 84°56′30″W
  - elevation: 0 m (0 ft)

The Lagarto River is a river of Costa Rica.
