= 1977 Kelantan Emergency =

Political crisis in Kelantan, Malaysia

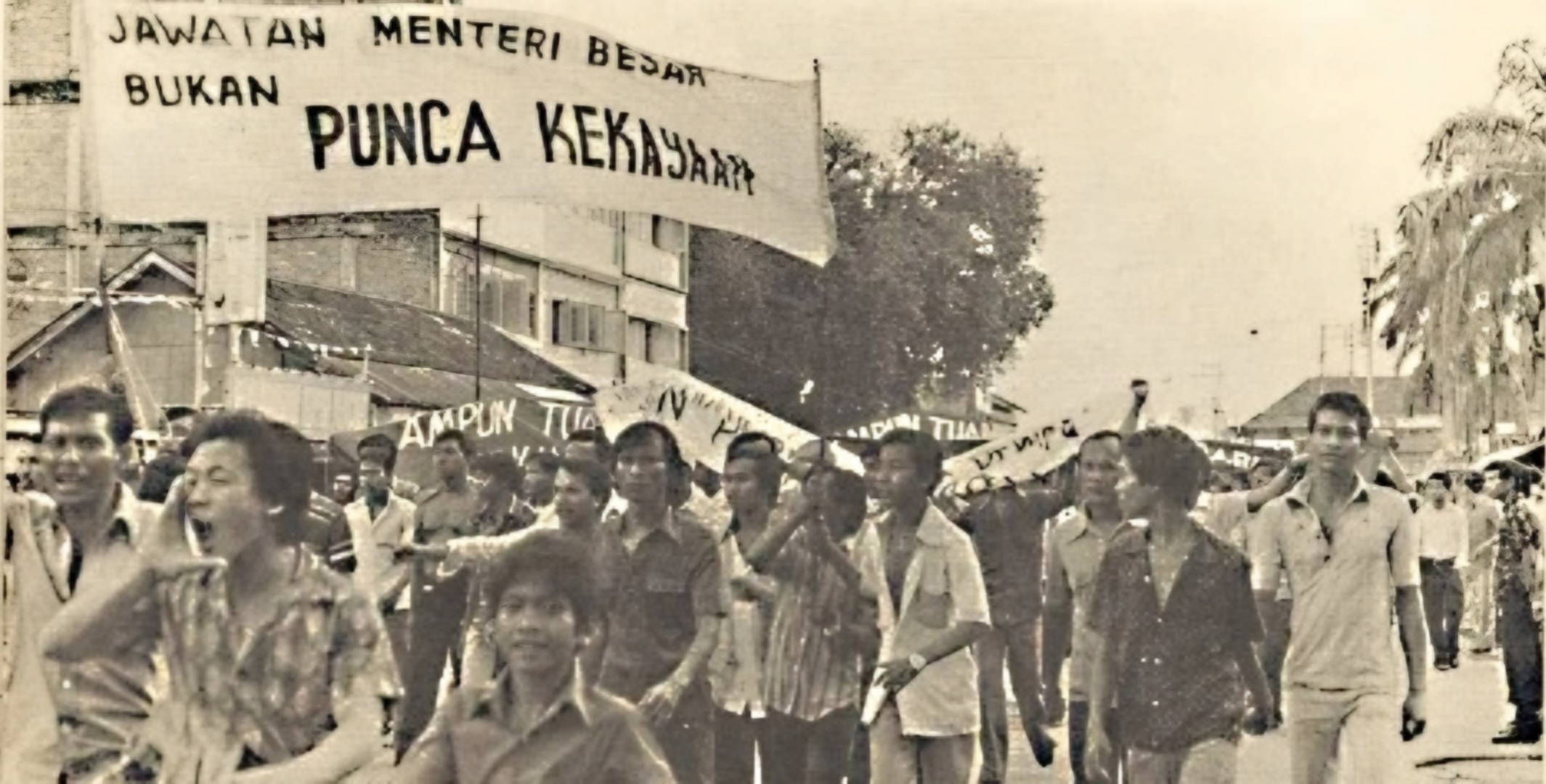
- Mohamad Nasir's supporters organised a protest in the streets of Kota Bharu in 1977.
- Date: 8 November 1977 – 12 February 1978
- Location: Kelantan, Malaysia
- Caused by: Dissatisfaction with Mohamed Nasir within PAS; Street violence and looting in Kota Bharu
- Goals: Dissolution of state assembly; Control of the Kelantan government
- Methods: No-confidence motion against Mohamed Nasir; Emergency declaration by federal government; Emergency governance under federal control
- Result: Declaration of emergency and dissolution of state assembly; Kelantan state election in March 1978; UMNO formed government in Kelantan; Expulsion of PAS from Barisan Nasional

Parties
Barisan Nasional (UMNO, MCA); Mohamed Nasir supporters (later BERJASA); Federal Government	Pan-Malaysian Islamic Party (PAS)

Lead figures
Hashim Aman; Mohamed Nasir; Mohamed Yaacob	Asri Muda

The 1977 Kelantan Emergency took place in the state of Kelantan in Malaysia. The state of emergency was declared by the Yang di-Pertuan Agong, Sultan Yahya Petra, who was also the Sultan of Kelantan at the time, on 8 November 1977, upon the request of the federal government following a political impasse and street violence in Kelantan. This was the fifth declaration of emergency in Malaya and Malaysia after the 1948–1960 Malayan Emergency, the Indonesia-Malaysia confrontation, the 1966 Sarawak constitutional crisis, and the 13 May Incident.

== Prelude to the declaration of emergency ==
The Menteri Besar (Chief Minister) of Kelantan in 1977 was Mohamed Nasir of the Pan-Malaysian Islamic Party (PAS). Since 1972, PAS had been part of the Alliance Party and, subsequently, Barisan Nasional (BN) (after 1974), the federal government-ruling coalition party. In 1977, Mohamed Nasir faced dissatisfaction within PAS and was accused of defying party instructions. A no-confidence motion was tabled in the state assembly, with 20 PAS assemblymen supporting the motion, while the other BN's 13 United Malays National Organisation (UMNO) and one Malaysian Chinese Association (MCA) assemblyman walked out in protest. Mohamed Nasir refused to resign. He then requested the Regent of Kelantan (as head of state) to dissolve the state assembly to pave the way for an election, but the request was refused. Consequently, Mohamed Nasir's supporters organised a protest in the streets of Kota Bharu, which escalated into mass violence and looting.

== Declaration of emergency and aftermath ==
On 8 November 1977, the Yang di-Pertuan Agong, who was also the Sultan of Kelantan at the time, declared a state of emergency in the state of Kelantan. The Emergency Powers (Kelantan) Act 1977 was passed by Parliament the following day, granting the federal government implied power to govern the state. Although being part of the Barisan Nasional coalition, 12 out of 14 PAS members of Parliament opposed the passing of the Act. Consequently, PAS was expelled from the BN coalition.

During the emergency, Mohamed Nasir retained the post of Menteri Besar but with limited powers, as ultimate executive authority was vested in the Director of the Federal Administration for Kelantan, appointed by the Prime Minister under the Emergency Powers (Kelantan) Act 1977. A senior civil servant, Hashim Aman (who was later appointed as Chief Secretary to the Government in 1982 and retired in 1984), was appointed to the position during the emergency period.

The Emergency was lifted in a proclamation by Yang Di-Pertuan Agong on 12 February 1978.

In March 1978, an election was held in Kelantan, months ahead of the national election. The election was contested by PAS, UMNO, and the Pan-Malaysian Islamic Front (BERJASA), a new party formed by Mohamed Nasir. UMNO won the election, securing 23 seats, while BERJASA won 11 and PAS won two seats, paving the way for UMNO to form the government in Kelantan for the first time.

After the election, BERJASA joined Barisan Nasional, and Mohamed Nasir became a Senator and Minister without Portfolio in the federal government, while Mohamed Yaacob of UMNO became the new Menteri Besar of Kelantan. Mohamed Yaacob retained the post until his defeat in 1990, when PAS regained control of Kelantan.
