= Abangares Mining Company =

Gold mining company

The Abangares Mining Company was a gold mining company in the Tilarán mountains, located in the Abangares district of the province of Guanacaste in Costa Rica. Founded by U.S. railroad, fruit, and shipping magnate Minor C. Keith, it established one of the earliest major commercial gold mining operations in the area of the country's oldest mining traditions, dating back over a century. It established several isolated mining towns, and brought many foreign laborers from Honduras, Nicaragua and Jamaica into the district.
