= 1978 Malaysian state elections =

State assembly elections were held in Malaysia on 8 July 1978 in all states except Kelantan, Sabah and Sarawak. Kelantan held its state assembly election months earlier on 11 March 1978.

== Results ==
=== Johor ===
Party or alliance		Votes	%	Seats	+/–
Barisan Nasional	United Malays National Organisation	176,368	47.32	20	0
Barisan Nasional	Malaysian Chinese Association	90,698	24.34	10	0
Barisan Nasional	Malaysian Indian Congress	7,665	2.06	1	0
Barisan Nasional	Total	274,731	73.72	31	0
Democratic Action Party		64,604	17.33	1	0
Pan-Malaysian Islamic Party		25,915	6.95	0	0
Independents		7,435	1.99	0	0
Total		372,685	100.00	32	0
Valid votes		372,685	94.55		
Invalid/blank votes		21,466	5.45		
Total votes		394,151	100.00		
Registered voters/turnout		507,579	77.65		
Source: Almanak Keputusan Pilihan Raya Umum: Parlimen & Dewan Undangan Negeri (1959-1999)

=== Kedah ===
Party or alliance		Votes	%	Seats	+/–
Barisan Nasional	United Malays National Organisation	136,553	41.70	14	+2
Barisan Nasional	Malaysian Chinese Association	36,911	11.27	4	+2
Barisan Nasional	Malaysian Indian Congress	6,735	2.06	1	+1
Barisan Nasional	Total	180,199	55.03	19	+5
Pan-Malaysian Islamic Party		129,346	39.50	7	–2
Democratic Action Party		5,597	1.71	0	-1
Kesatuan Insaf Tanah Air		735	0.22	0	0
Parti Sosialis Rakyat Malaysia		567	0.17	0	0
Social Democratic Party		54	0.02	0	0
Independents		10,976	3.35	0	-1
Total		327,474	100.00	26	0
Valid votes		327,474	95.53		
Invalid/blank votes		15,311	4.47		
Total votes		342,785	100.00		
Registered voters/turnout		443,656	77.26		
Source: Almanak Keputusan Pilihan Raya Umum: Parlimen & Dewan Undangan Negeri (1959-1999)

=== Kelantan ===
Party or alliance		Votes	%	Seats	+/–
Barisan Nasional	United Malays National Organisation	82,236	34.61	22	+9
Barisan Nasional	Malaysian Chinese Association	6,435	2.71	1	0
Barisan Nasional	Total	88,671	37.32	23	+9
Pan-Malaysian Islamic Party		79,514	33.47	2	–20
Pan-Malaysian Islamic Front		64,680	27.23	11	New
Independents		4,709	1.98	0	0
Total		237,574	100.00	36	0
Valid votes		237,574	98.35		
Invalid/blank votes		3,992	1.65		
Total votes		241,566	100.00		
Registered voters/turnout		321,669	75.10		
Source: Almanak Keputusan Pilihan Raya Umum: Parlimen & Dewan Undangan Negeri (1959-1999)

=== Malacca ===
Party or alliance		Votes	%	Seats	+/–
Barisan Nasional	United Malays National Organisation	43,037	34.48	13	+1
Barisan Nasional	Malaysian Chinese Association	22,158	17.75	3	0
Barisan Nasional	Malaysian Indian Congress	2,680	2.15	0	0
Barisan Nasional	Total	67,875	54.37	16	0
Democratic Action Party		39,147	31.36	4	0
Pan-Malaysian Islamic Party		16,128	12.92	0	–1
Independents		1,679	1.35	0	0
Total		124,829	100.00	20	0
Valid votes		124,829	96.26		
Invalid/blank votes		4,856	3.74		
Total votes		129,685	100.00		
Registered voters/turnout		167,344	77.50		
Source: Almanak Keputusan Pilihan Raya Umum: Parlimen & Dewan Undangan Negeri (1959-1999)

=== Negri Sembilan ===
Party or alliance		Votes	%	Seats	+/–
Barisan Nasional	United Malays National Organisation	56,970	35.72	15	+1
Barisan Nasional	Malaysian Chinese Association	33,319	20.89	5	0
Barisan Nasional	Malaysian Indian Congress	4,327	2.71	1	0
Barisan Nasional	Total	94,616	59.33	21	+1
Democratic Action Party		45,992	28.84	3	0
Pan-Malaysian Islamic Party		11,523	7.23	0	–1
Malaysian Social Justice Party		118	0.07	0	0
Independents		7,230	4.53	0	0
Total		159,479	100.00	24	0
Valid votes		159,479	95.14		
Invalid/blank votes		8,154	4.86		
Total votes		167,633	100.00		
Registered voters/turnout		214,705	78.08		
Source: Almanak Keputusan Pilihan Raya Umum: Parlimen & Dewan Undangan Negeri (1959-1999)

=== Pahang ===
Party or alliance		Votes	%	Seats	+/–
Barisan Nasional	United Malays National Organisation	75,992	42.88	24	+1
Barisan Nasional	Malaysian Chinese Association	31,365	17.70	7	0
Barisan Nasional	Malaysian Indian Congress	2,384	1.35	1	0
Barisan Nasional	Total	109,741	61.92	32	0
Pan-Malaysian Islamic Party		27,490	15.51	0	-1
Democratic Action Party		22,943	12.95	0	0
Parti Sosialis Rakyat Malaysia		9,009	5.08	0	0
Independents		8,050	4.54	0	0
Total		177,233	100.00	32	0
Valid votes		177,233	94.23		
Invalid/blank votes		10,858	5.77		
Total votes		188,091	100.00		
Registered voters/turnout		258,024	72.90		
Source: Almanak Keputusan Pilihan Raya Umum: Parlimen & Dewan Undangan Negeri (1959-1999)

=== Penang ===
Party or alliance		Votes	%	Seats	+/–
Barisan Nasional	Parti Gerakan Rakyat Malaysia	61,075	20.94	8	–3
Barisan Nasional	United Malays National Organisation	44,774	15.35	9	0
Barisan Nasional	Malaysian Chinese Association	23,879	8.19	2	+1
Barisan Nasional	Malaysian Indian Congress	5,747	1.97	1	0
Barisan Nasional	Total	135,475	46.45	20	–2
Democratic Action Party		77,484	26.56	5	+3
Pan-Malaysian Islamic Party		28,768	9.86	1	0
Social Democratic Party		10,259	3.52	0	0
Parti Sosialis Rakyat Malaysia		9,508	3.26	0	0
Kesatuan Insaf Tanah Air		1,138	0.39	0	0
Independents		29,055	9.96	1	0
Total		291,687	100.00	27	0
Valid votes		291,687	95.90		
Invalid/blank votes		12,455	4.10		
Total votes		304,142	100.00		
Registered voters/turnout		383,134	79.38		
Source: Almanak Keputusan Pilihan Raya Umum: Parlimen & Dewan Undangan Negeri (1959-1999)

=== Perak ===
Party or alliance		Votes	%	Seats	+/–
Barisan Nasional	United Malays National Organisation	137,566	25.79	23	+2
Barisan Nasional	Malaysian Chinese Association	67,325	12.62	4	+1
Barisan Nasional	People's Progressive Party	36,851	6.91	2	0
Barisan Nasional	Malaysian Indian Congress	14,018	2.63	1	0
Barisan Nasional	Parti Gerakan Rakyat Malaysia	13,568	2.54	2	+1
Barisan Nasional	Total	269,328	50.49	32	+4
Democratic Action Party		195,146	36.58	9	–2
Pan-Malaysian Islamic Party		62,832	11.78	1	–2
United People's Party		1,023	0.19	0	0
Malaysian Social Justice Party		381	0.07	0	0
Independents		4,750	0.89	0	0
Total		533,460	100.00	42	0
Valid votes		533,460	95.91		
Invalid/blank votes		22,727	4.09		
Total votes		556,187	100.00		
Registered voters/turnout		736,963	75.47		
Source: Almanak Keputusan Pilihan Raya Umum: Parlimen & Dewan Undangan Negeri (1959-1999)

=== Perlis ===
Party or alliance		Votes	%	Seats	+/–
Barisan Nasional	United Malays National Organisation	22,068	50.66	10	+2
Barisan Nasional	Malaysian Chinese Association	3,083	7.08	2	0
Barisan Nasional	Total	25,151	57.74	12	+2
Pan-Malaysian Islamic Party		12,735	29.23	0	–2
Independents		5,676	13.03	0	0
Total		43,562	100.00	12	0
Valid votes		43,562	94.48		
Invalid/blank votes		2,543	5.52		
Total votes		46,105	100.00		
Registered voters/turnout		59,477	77.52		
Source: Almanak Keputusan Pilihan Raya Umum: Parlimen & Dewan Undangan Negeri (1959-1999)

=== Selangor ===
Party or alliance		Votes	%	Seats	+/–
Barisan Nasional	United Malays National Organisation	107,629	32.78	20	+1
Barisan Nasional	Malaysian Chinese Association	44,140	13.44	5	–1
Barisan Nasional	Parti Gerakan Rakyat Malaysia	24,504	7.46	1	0
Barisan Nasional	Malaysian Indian Congress	23,209	7.07	3	0
Barisan Nasional	Total	199,482	60.76	29	0
Democratic Action Party		53,711	16.36	3	+2
Pan-Malaysian Islamic Party		48,129	14.66	0	–1
Malaysian Social Justice Party		11,530	3.51	0	0
Parti Sosialis Rakyat Malaysia		550	0.17	0	0
Malaysian Workers' Party		132	0.04	0	New
Independents		14,771	4.50	1	–1
Total		328,305	100.00	33	0
Valid votes		328,305	93.16		
Invalid/blank votes		24,097	6.84		
Total votes		352,402	100.00		
Registered voters/turnout		473,533	74.42		
Source: Almanak Keputusan Pilihan Raya Umum: Parlimen & Dewan Undangan Negeri (1959-1999)

=== Trengganu ===
Party or alliance		Votes	%	Seats	+/–
Barisan Nasional	United Malays National Organisation	73,195	53.03	27	+10
Barisan Nasional	Malaysian Chinese Association	3,850	2.79	1	0
Barisan Nasional	Total	77,045	55.82	28	+10
Pan-Malaysian Islamic Party		50,732	36.76	0	–9
Parti Sosialis Rakyat Malaysia		9,894	7.17	0	0
Independents		344	0.25	0	-1
Total		138,015	100.00	28	0
Valid votes		138,015	94.30		
Invalid/blank votes		8,335	5.70		
Total votes		146,350	100.00		
Registered voters/turnout		190,996	76.62		
Source: Almanak Keputusan Pilihan Raya Umum: Parlimen & Dewan Undangan Negeri (1959-1999)
