= Pan-Malaysian Islamic Front =

Malaysian political party

- Malay name: Barisan Jemaah Islamiah Se-Malaysia باريسن جماعه اسلاميه سمليسيا
- Chinese name: 泛馬來西亞伊斯蘭陣綫 泛马来西亚伊斯兰阵线; Fàn mǎláixīyà yīsīlán zhènxiàn
- Abbreviation: BERJASA / برجاس
- Chairman: Zamani Ibrahim
- Secretary-General: Lukman Al Hakim
- Vice President: Afif Badrulisham; Fadhila Ashaari; Fahmi Bazlan Muda; Rosli Bin Ramli
- Founder: Mohamed Nasir
- Founded: 1977
- Split from: Malaysian Islamic Party (PAS)
- Headquarters: BP 1-17,JLN BPD 1 BUSINESS PARK, D'alpinia, 47100 Puchong, Selangor, Malaysia.
- Newspaper: TV Pertiwi
- Youth wing: Angkatan Pemuda-Pemudi BERJASA (ANGKASA)
- Women wing: Wanita BERJASA
- Membership: 48,965 (Claimed)
- Ideology: Islamism; Religious nationalism Right-wing populism Ketuanan Melayu
- Political position: Right-wing to far-right
- Religion: Sunni Islam
- National affiliation: Barisan Nasional (BN) (1978–1983), Harakah Keadilan Rakyat (HAK) (1983 - 1989); Angkatan Perpaduan Ummah (APU) (1989–1998) @ Gagasan Rakyat (GR) (1989 - 1996), Gagasan Sejahtera (GS) (2016–2020), Gerakan Tanah Air (GTA) (2022–now); Allied coalition: Perikatan Nasional (2020-2022, since 2026); Ikatan Prihatin Rakyat (since 2025) (Note: The party was formerly part of the)
- Colors: Dark Pink
- Slogan: "Kerpimpinnan Baru Malaysia!" "New Leadership For Malaysia!"
- Anthem: Bersama Pimpin Negara
- Dewan Negara: 0 / 70
- Dewan Rakyat: 0 / 222
- State Legislative Assemblies: 0 / 607

Election symbol
- 0

Party flag

Website
- berjasa.org.my

Parti Berjasa Malaysia, officially known as Barisan Jemaah Islamiah Se-Malaysia or BERJASA, is an Islamist political party in Malaysia.

The party is part of a Malay-Islam based coalition named "Gerakan Tanah Air".

== History ==
BERJASA logo (1977-2020)

The party was founded in 1977 by then Chief Minister of Kelantan, Mohamed Nasir, as a splinter of the Malaysian Islamic Party (PAS) against the backdrop of the 1977 Kelantan Emergency, in which he played a major role. The party received the support of the United Malays National Organisation (UMNO), the leading party in the then-ruling Barisan Nasional (BN) coalition. The split proved to be severely detrimental to PAS in a state election called months ahead of the 1978 Malaysian general election; among the 36 seats in the state's legislative assembly, UMNO won 23, BERJASA won 11, while PAS won only two.

BERJASA subsequently joined BN, but support for BERJASA quickly dissolved and it only won four seats in the Kelantan state assembly in the 1982 general election. The same year, Syed Hussein Alatas, who was the former president of Parti Gerakan Rakyat Malaysia and a noted academic, joined BERJASA as a member of its supreme council. He would quit the party in 1983. BERJASA stayed out of the 1986 general election as it had pulled out from BN in protest of the admission of another new splinter party of PAS, Parti Hizbul Muslimin Malaysia (HAMIM) into BN. In 1989, it joined Angkatan Perpaduan Ummah (APU) opposition parties coalition under the leadership of Parti Melayu Semangat 46 (S46). It won only one state seat in the 1990 general election but failed to retain it in 1995 general election. APU alliance was subsequently dissolved in 1996 after Tengku Razaleigh Hamzah decided to dissolve it and rejoin UMNO. Since then, BERJASA only maintained minimal and nearly inactive participation in the political fray, as evidenced from their participation in subsequent general elections.

In the 2013 general elections (GE13), in spite of the party empowered by the NGO of Malaysian Muslim Solidarity or Ikatan Muslimin Malaysia (ISMA) leaders; who contested under the ticket of BERJASA but all had lost as candidates. Some of the ISMA leaders has joined BERJASA to remain active in politics since.

BERJASA president Dr. Mustapa Kamal Maulut in announcing plan to contest the approaching 2018 general elections (GE14), had controversially declared it's a 'Cooperative' party in order to attract potential voters who are also cooperative members, with contentious claim it's trying to develop the nation economy through the cooperative which were refuted by the Angkatan Koperasi Kebangsaan Malaysia Bhd (ANGKASA) and Suruhanjaya Koperasi Malaysia (SKM). The party received a facelift in 2016 then when it joined Gagasan Sejahtera (GS), an informal alliance of opposition parties led by the PAS together with Parti Ikatan Bangsa Malaysia (IKATAN). In GE 14, under GS alliance BERJASA contested using PAS logo in three parliamentary seats, namely in Cameron Highlands, Selayang and Tanjung Piai and in the state seats of Sungai Manik and Batu Kurau. The party failed to win any of the seats, with all of their candidates losing their deposits. Feeling betrayed by PAS in GE14, in the 2019 Tanjung Piai by-election, BERJASA fielded its president, Prof. Dato' Dr. Badrulhisham Abdul Aziz to contest on its own banner ignoring the GS alliance. but only obtained 850 votes to finish forth, in the six-cornered fight for the parliamentary seat.

In September 2020, BERJASA officially unveiled "purple" as the party's new colours in line with its rejuvenation process to be a more vigorous and energetical party in facing a challenging political survival and forthcoming general election (G15). Ustaz Zamani Ibrahim has been elected as the BERJASA president beginning 27 March 2021. The apparent ISMA link has verified the speculations the NGO is taking over the political party to be its political vehicle amidst ISMA's denial.

BERJASA team up with PEJUANG, PUTRA, IMAN to form GTA, and lost all seats.

== Government offices ==
=== State governments ===
- Kelantan (1978–1986, 1990–1995)

Note: bold as Menteri Besar/Chief Minister, italic as junior partner

== General election results ==
Election	Total seats won	Seats contested	Total votes	Share of votes	Outcome of election	Election leader
1978	0 / 193				; No representation in Parliament (Barisan Nasional)	N/A
1982	0 / 193				; No representation in Parliament (Barisan Nasional)	N/A
1999	0 / 193	45	409	0.01%	; No representation in Parliament	N/A
2013	0 / 222	9	31,835	0.29%	; No representation in Parliament	N/A
2018	0 / 222	1	81	0.00%	; No representation in Parliament (Gagasan Sejahtera)	Abdul Kadir Mamat
2022	0 / 222	9	4,252	0.03%	; No representation in Parliament (Gerakan Tanah Air)	Zamani Ibrahim

== State election results ==
State assembly	Election	Votes	%	Seats	Won/contested	+/–	Position (Note: As part of electoral coalition.)	Status
Perlis	2022	Did not contest						No seats
Kedah	2023	Did not contest						No seats
Kelantan	2023	Did not contest						No seats
Terengganu	2023	Did not contest						No seats
Penang	2023	Did not contest						No seats
Perak	2022	Did not contest						No seats
Pahang	2022	820	0.1	0 / 42	0 / 1	Steady	4th (Gerakan Tanah Air)	No seats
Selangor	2023	Did not contest						No seats
Negeri Sembilan	2026	5,844	0.9	0 / 36	0 / 1	Steady	5th	No seats
Malacca	2026	Did not contest						No seats
Johor	2026	Did not contest						No seats
Sabah	2025	Did not contest						No seats
Sarawak	2021	Did not contest						No seats

Note

State election	State Legislative Assembly						
State election	Kedah	Kelantan	Perak	Pahang	Negeri Sembilan	Selangor	Total won / Total contested
2/3 majority	2 / 3	2 / 3	2 / 3	2 / 3		2 / 3	2 / 3
1978		11 / 36		0 / 32			11 / 28
1982		4 / 36					4 / 11
1990		1 / 39					1 / 1
1995		0 / 43					0 / 1
2013	0 / 36		0 / 59			0 / 58	0 / 5
2018			0 / 59				0 / 2
2022				0 / 42			0 / 1
2026					0 / 36		0 / 1

== See also ==
- Mohamed Nasir
- 1977 Kelantan Emergency
- Malaysian Muslim Solidarity
- Politics of Malaysia
- List of political parties in Malaysia
