= Abangares River =

River in Costa Rica

- Location of mouth

Location
- Country: Costa Rica

Physical characteristics
- Mouth
  - coordinates: 10°08′37″N 85°04′37″W

Abangares River (Spanish: Rio Abangares) is a river of Costa Rica.
