= UGA Costa Rica =

UGA Costa Rica was one of the three international residential centers owned and operated by the University of Georgia, but is now owned by a nonprofit that continues to allow access as before by University of Georgia students, as well as students from other universities and colleges. The other two centers are in Oxford, England and Cortona, Italy. Costa Rica is used as a site for research, study abroad, symposia, and ecotourism.

In February 2019, the University of Georgia announced the sale of the campus to the Council on International Educational Exchange (CIEE), a study abroad nonprofit organization, and it still serves students from the University of Georgia and other colleges and universities.

== Study Abroad ==
The Costa Rica campus, located at the foot of the Monteverde Cloud Forest, is one of the sites for the University of Georgia's study abroad programs, though other American universities utilize the campus for study abroad as well. Currently UGA Costa Rica offers 23 annual programs held during the fall, spring, Maymester, and summer terms as designated by the University of Georgia. The scope of each program differs greatly as Costa Rica works with over 50 UGA faculty members in 28 academic disciplines.

== Sustainability Initiatives ==
A large part of UGA Costa Rica's mission is a dedication to sustainable initiatives, evident in both the academic content and excursions of its study abroad experience and the Sustainability Report it publishes and distributes through the University of Georgia annually.

=== Carbon Offset Program ===
Launched in January 2008, the Carbon Offset Program is a unique component of UGA Costa Rica's study abroad experience. In addition to offsetting carbon emissions related to the participant's international travel and the efforts to restore critical lost habitats where tropical rain forests once stood, UGA Costa Rica's Carbon Offset Program seeks to establish long-term research forests where scientists from the University of Georgia and elsewhere can study the effects of climate change; Forest, soils, and wildlife ecology; sustainable silviculture and soils management techniques; and even sociological issues.

=== Pájaro Campana Biological Corridor ===
Trees planted through UGA Costa Rica's Carbon Offset Program augment the Pájaro Campana Biological Corridor, which forms part of the Mesoamerican Biological Corridor stretching from southern Mexico through Panama. UGA Costa Rica's general manager, Fabricio Camacho, serves as the President of the Advisory Committee for this Corridor, which is recognized by the Costa Rican Government as part of the country's national biological corridor program. These reforestation efforts aim to improve forest connectivity throughout the Pájaro Campana Biological Corridor, and will directly contribute to the establishment of new habitat for the three-wattled bellbird—known in Spanish as the pájaro campana, the flagship species for the corridor—and the resplendent quetzal, two migratory species greatly impacted by habitat loss in this region.

UGA Costa Rica's partners in the Carbon Offset program include the Fundación Conservacionista Costarricense (FCC), the Tropical Science Center (CCT), the Monteverde Conservation League (MCL), and the Costa Rican government's System of Conservation Areas (SINAC) and Ministry of Environment (MINAET), among others. Faculty and administration from the Warnell School of Forestry and Natural Resources and the Odum School of Ecology, both at the University of Georgia, provide administrative and technical guidance for the UGA Costa Rica Carbon Offset Program.

== Campus ==
The Costa Rica campus sits at the head of the San Luis Valley adjacent to the Monteverde Cloud Forest Reserve. Though 155 acres in size, only about 10% of the property contains built structures of any kind, leaving the majority of the campus situated in a web of federally protected but privately owned natural forests. A series of 360° photographs were uploaded to the UGA Costa Rica official website on February 8, 2011, providing 19 high-definition panoramic images of the campus grounds.

Altogether the campus comprises 36,000 square feet (3,300 m^{2}) of built space, which was designed almost exclusively by the University of Georgia's College of Environment & Design.

=== Academic Facilities ===
==== Student Union ====
This building serves as the Costa Rica campus' central gathering space. With a large veranda overlooking the main stretch of campus, the Student Union houses the cafeteria, library, computer lab, a series of academic offices, as well as the reception area for the Ecolodge San Luis.

==== Natural Science Wet Laboratory ====
Built in 2004, a climate-controlled laboratory has been designed for short-, mid- and long-term scientific research.

==== Open Air Classrooms ====
Renovated in 2006, these open-air classrooms are used for lectures, seminars, slide presentations, and a variety of hands-on activities.

==== Indoor Classroom ====
Completed in July 2007, the Chachalaca indoor classroom represents the newest of Costa Rica's academic facilities. This classroom includes IT equipment for class presentations with mounted and movable whiteboards.

==== Student Recreation Center ====
The Recreation Center is an open-air space designated for larger social functions. The building was completed in 2007 and includes a fireplace as well as ping pong and foosball tables.

=== Residential Facilities ===
Costa Rica's residential facilities include housing for the students, faculty, researchers, resident naturalists, and a variety of interns.

==== Cabinas ====
Nestled among the trees, the cabinas are the primary residential area for faculty teaching on study abroad programs, and serve also as the lodging suites for tourists staying at the Ecolodge San Luis. These twelve rooms sleep one to four people.

==== Bungalows ====
The student bungalows are the primary residences for study abroad program participants. Sixteen rooms in four separate buildings sleep four people each, utilizing two bunk beds per room. Each bungalow contains a private bathroom, two desks, and ample closet space. A covered veranda rings each of the bungalow buildings.

==== Resident Faculty House ====
The Resident Faculty House provides private space for long-term faculty or researchers. It is a located a short walk from the Student Union and sits immediately adjacent to the San Luis Botanical Garden.

==== Casitas ====
Five casitas are available for use by volunteer staff and graduate researchers.

=== San Luis Botanical Garden ===
The Monteverde region is home to more than 2,500 species of plants, including 420 species of orchids and 700 species of trees. The San Luis Botanical Garden displays a small but diverse sample of Monteverde's botanical diversity.

The San Luis Botanical Garden was designed in the summer of 2003 when six UGA landscape architecture students spent a week developing the garden's master plan under the tutelage of Gregg Coyle from UGA's College of Environment & Design. The result is a five-acre sustainable design featuring numerous native plants identified by photo-metal labels provided by the State Botanical Garden of Georgia.

=== Hiking Trails ===
The campus currently has 2.5 kilometers of walking trails that wind throughout its 155-acre property, the longest of which being the Camino Real trail.
