= Puntarenas =

- City
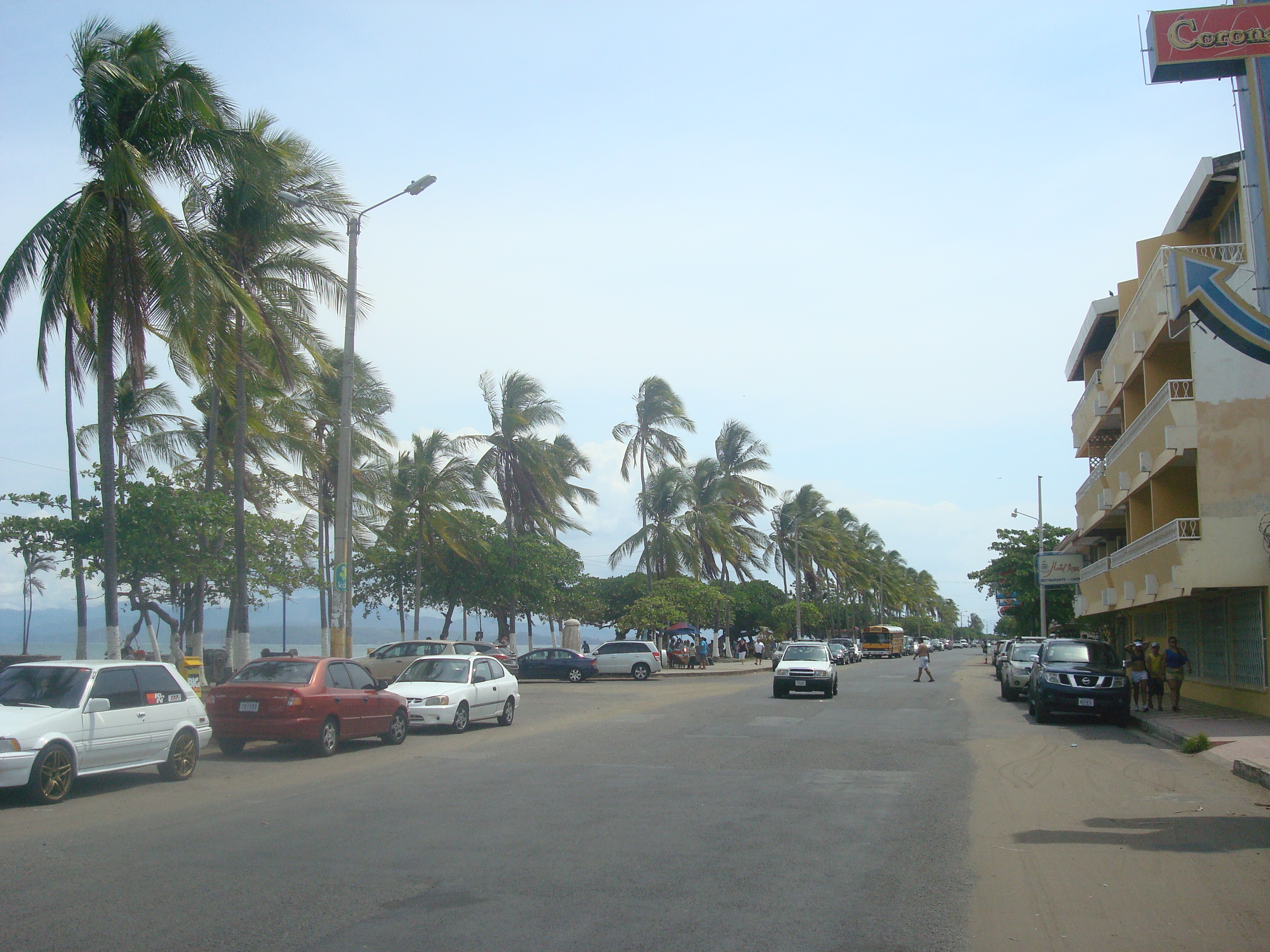
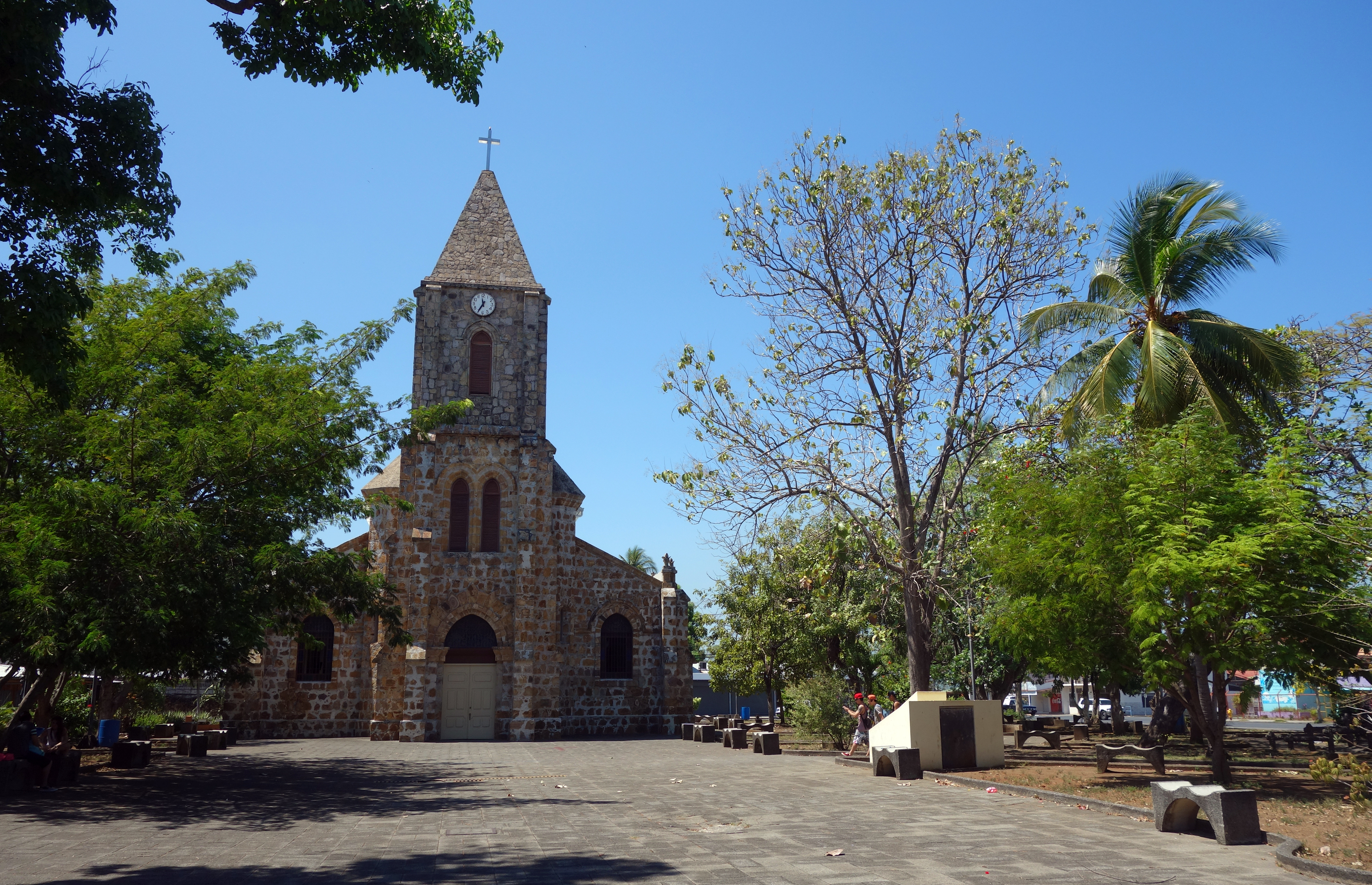
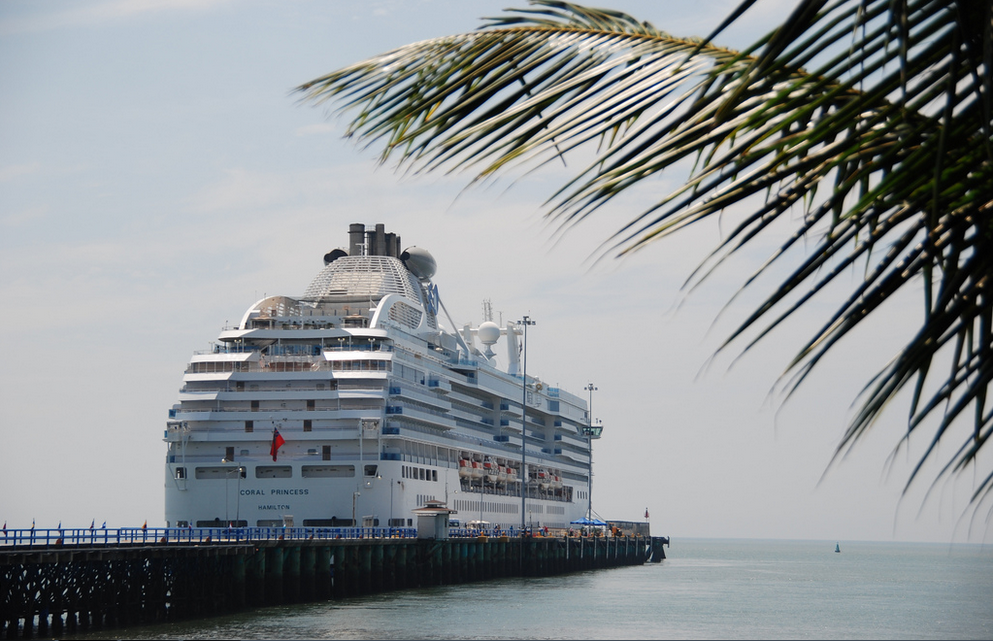
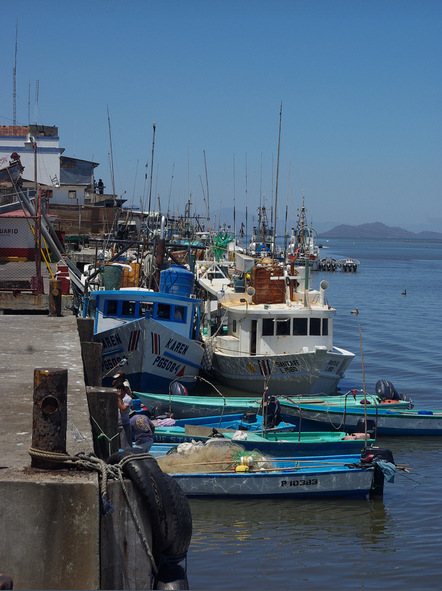
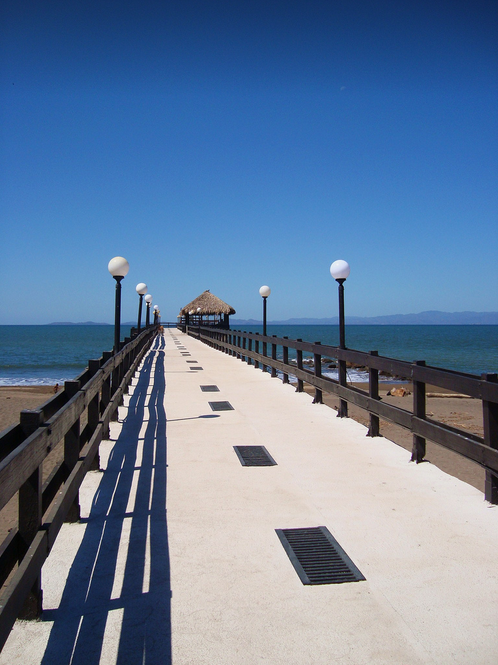
- Images, from top down, left to right: the Port Laborer Monument, Tourists Pass Avenue, The Cathedral within Central Park, Coral Princess docked at Puntarenas' Port, docked fishing boats, Puntarenas Pier.

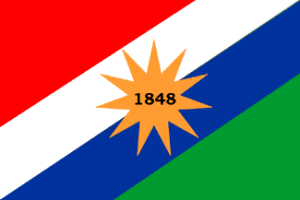
- Flag Coat of arms
- Nickname: La Perla del Pacífico "The Pacific Pearl"
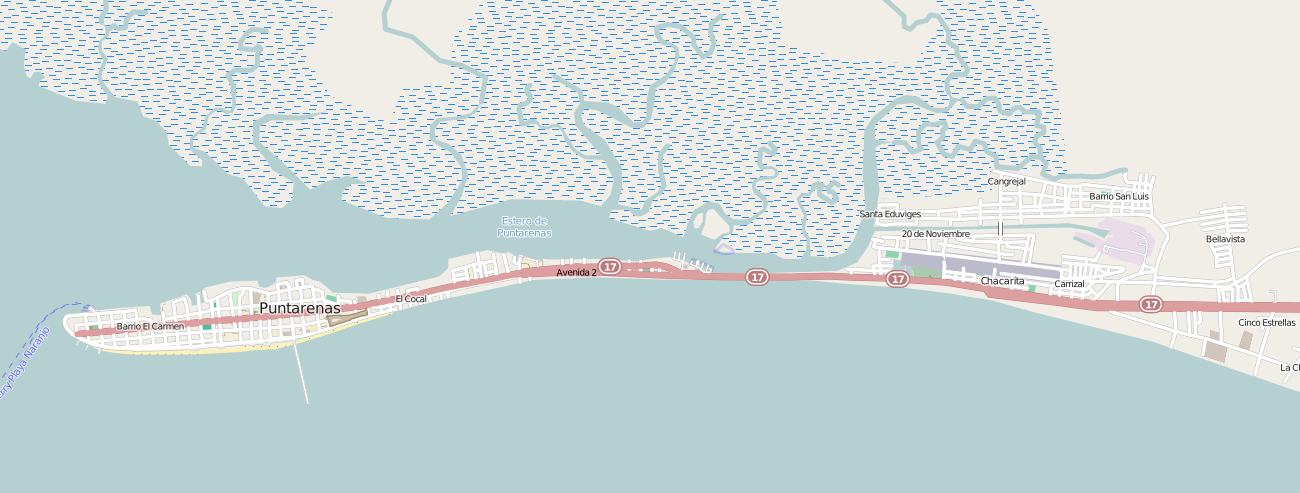
- Puntarenas and surrounding area

- Location of Puntarenas within Costa Rica
- Coordinates: 9°58′N 84°50′W
- Country: Costa Rica
- Province: Puntarenas
- Canton: Puntarenas
- Districts: Puntarenas, Chacarita, El Roble
- Creation: 17 September 1858

Area
  - City: 47.46 km^{2} (18.32 sq mi)
- Elevation: 5 m (16 ft)

Population (2020)
  - City: 10,231
  - Density: 215.6/km^{2} (558.3/sq mi)
  - Urban: 87,500
  - Demonym: Puntarenense
- Time zone: UTC-6 (Central)
- Postal code: 60101, 60112, 60115
- Area code: + 506
- Climate: Aw
- Website: (in Spanish)

Puntarenas (Spanish pronunciation: [puntaˈɾenas]) is a city in the Puntarenas Province, on the Pacific coast of Costa Rica. As the seat of the Municipality of Puntarenas canton, it is awarded the title of city, which comprises the Puntarenas, Chacarita and El Roble districts. As the city of the first canton of the province, it is the capital city of the Puntarenas Province as well, according to the Administrative divisions of Costa Rica.

== Toponymy ==
The name Puntarenas comes from a portmanteau of punta and arenas, which means "point" and "sands", respectively. In English this would translate roughly to "Sand Point". The name is first referenced by the arrival in February 1720 of the pirate John Clipperton to the area, which recorded in his journals to have arrived to a "Punta de Arena", referring to the needle-like area on which the city stands today. The name is also given to the oddly shaped province of Puntarenas, which (as the most extensive province in the country), has its largest section in the South, far from the main city.

== Overview ==
There are some 100,000 inhabitants in the town and surrounding neighborhoods. Its Pacific Ocean beaches attract many tourists, especially surfers. It is also a possible stopover point for the tourist destination Monteverde, to the northwest.

Its port, Caldera, is one of the main ports and the oldest port in the country. There are regular scheduled ferries to and from Puntarenas and the Nicoya Peninsula.

== History ==
The first European to discover Puntarenas was Gil González Dávila in 1522. Despite the use of the Gulf of Nicoya as an entryway to Costa Rica's inland territory, the port of Puntarenas was not developed until 1840 when coffee production in the highlands reached exportable volumes. In 1845 the Congress of the Republic declared Puntarenas a duty-free port (with the exception of Cognac and hard liquor). Originally, the coffee was brought to port in oxcarts via a trail through the mountains. In 1859, a stretch of railway track was completed between Puntarenas and the town of Esparza (one of the country's earliest Spanish settlements, founded in 1574). Eventually, the railway was built all the way through to San José and service was inaugurated in 1910.

With the railway connection to the Central Valley, the Pacific port's activities continued to be a major part of the region's economy throughout the 20th century. However, due to the aging and deterioration of the port facilities and the need to accommodate the much larger vessels of modern shipping fleets, a new port was constructed in the 1980s to the south of Puntarenas. The site chosen was Caldera (located at 9.9108438°N 84.7194761°W), where ships had anchored during colonial times. Caldera was more appropriate site for larger ships, and actually was the first port site used since 1522.

== Sports ==
The city's major football teams are Second Division sides Puntarenas F.C., who have played many seasons at the highest level, along with Jacó Rays.

== Cuisine ==
As a major port on the Pacific coast, the gastronomy of Puntarenas is characterized by several seafood dishes, such as ceviche.

A very popular dessert is the Churchill, a type of snow cone.

== Climate ==
Puntarenas is generally hotter than the Costa Rican Central Valley, with daytime highs ranging from 30 to 35 °C (86 to 95 °F) in the coldest/hottest months, respectively.

Climate data for Puntarenas
Month	Jan	Feb	Mar	Apr	May	Jun	Jul	Aug	Sep	Oct	Nov	Dec	Year
Mean daily maximum °C (°F)	33.5 (92.3)	34.4 (93.9)	34.0 (93.2)	34.6 (94.3)	33.1 (91.6)	32.2 (90.0)	32.2 (90.0)	32.2 (90.0)	31.9 (89.4)	31.6 (88.9)	31.8 (89.2)	32.0 (89.6)	32.8 (91.0)
Daily mean °C (°F)	27.6 (81.7)	28.3 (82.9)	28.5 (83.3)	29.2 (84.6)	28.6 (83.5)	27.9 (82.2)	27.7 (81.9)	27.7 (81.9)	27.5 (81.5)	27.4 (81.3)	27.3 (81.1)	27.1 (80.8)	27.9 (82.2)
Mean daily minimum °C (°F)	21.7 (71.1)	22.2 (72.0)	22.9 (73.2)	23.7 (74.7)	24.1 (75.4)	23.6 (74.5)	23.2 (73.8)	23.1 (73.6)	23.1 (73.6)	23.2 (73.8)	22.8 (73.0)	22.1 (71.8)	23.0 (73.4)
Average rainfall mm (inches)	5.5 (0.22)	4.1 (0.16)	4.9 (0.19)	30.3 (1.19)	204.1 (8.04)	217.3 (8.56)	175.7 (6.92)	223.1 (8.78)	296.1 (11.66)	279.1 (10.99)	132.0 (5.20)	27.7 (1.09)	1,599.9 (63)
Average rainy days	1.8	1.9	2.9	7.8	19.1	21.0	18.0	21.8	24.3	24.5	14.7	5.7	163.5
Mean monthly sunshine hours	263.5	254.3	282.1	255.0	201.5	156.0	164.3	170.5	159.0	167.4	183.0	232.5	2,489.1
Source 1: World Meteorological Organization
Source 2: Hong Kong Observatory

== Sister Cities ==
- Kesennuma, Japan
- Loma Linda, United States

== Notable people ==
- Laura Fernández Delgado (born 1986), 50th President of Costa Rica; the current president of Costa Rica
