= Barranca District =

District in Puntarenas canton, Puntarenas province, Costa Rica

Barranca
- District
- Interactive map of Barranca
- Barranca district location in Costa Rica
- Coordinates: 10.0013335°N 84.7121014°W
- Country: Costa Rica
- Province: Puntarenas
- Canton: Puntarenas
- Creation: 20 November 1965

Area
  - Total: 36.07 km^{2} (13.93 sq mi)
- Elevation: 27 m (89 ft)

Population (2011)
  - Total: 30,650
  - Density: 849.7/km^{2} (2,201/sq mi)
- Time zone: UTC−06:00
- Postal code: 60108

Barranca is a district of the Puntarenas canton, in the Puntarenas province of Costa Rica.

== History ==
Barranca was created on 20 November 1965 by Ley 3594. Segregated from Puntarenas.

== Geography ==
Barranca has an area of 36.07 km^{2} (13.93 sq mi) and an elevation of 27 metres.

== Demographics ==
Historical population
Census	Pop.	±% p.a.
1973	5,883	—
1984	15,882	+9.45%
2000	33,493	+4.77%
2011	30,650	−0.80%
2022	34,827	+1.17%
Source: Instituto Nacional de Estadística y Censos; Centro Centroamericano de Población

For the 2011 census, Barranca had a population of 30,650 inhabitants.

== Transportation ==
=== Road transportation ===
The district is covered by the following road routes:

- National Route 1
- National Route 17
- National Route 23
