= La Unión District =

La Unión District may refer to:

- Peru:
  - La Unión District, Piura, in Piura province, Piura region
  - La Unión District, Dos de Mayo, in Dos de Mayo province, Huánuco region
  - La Unión District, Tarma, in Tarma province, Junín region
- Costa Rica:
  - La Unión District, Montes de Oro, in Montes de Oro Canton, Puntarenas province

== See also ==
- La Unión
