= Chira Island =

Island and district in Puntarenas canton, Puntarenas province, Costa Rica

Chira
- Island and district
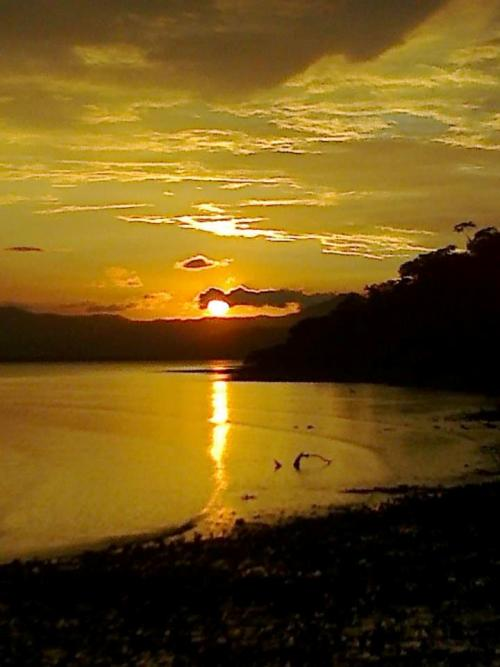
- Sunset in Chira Island
- Interactive map of Chira
- Chira district location in Costa Rica
- Coordinates: 10.0996249°N 85.145746°W
- Country: Costa Rica
- Province: Puntarenas
- Canton: Puntarenas
- District creation: 28 September 1998

Area
  - Total: 43.0 km^{2} (16.6 sq mi)
- Elevation: 15 m (49 ft)

Population (2011)
  - Total: 1,576
  - Density: 36.7/km^{2} (94.9/sq mi)
- Time zone: UTC−06:00
- Postal code: 60113

Chira Island is a 4,300-hectare (11,000-acre) Costa Rican Pacific island located at the upper end of the Gulf of Nicoya, belonging to the Puntarenas canton, in the Puntarenas province of Costa Rica.

== History ==
Chira district was created on 28 September 1998 by Decreto Ejecutivo 27396-G.

== Geography ==
Chira has an area of 43.0 km^{2} (16.6 sq mi) and an elevation of 15 metres.

It possesses an extensive inlet of seawater that is the result of a geological fault that has caused the land to submerge, leaving exposed only the tops of what were formerly low hills. These are the various islands that dot the Gulf, the largest of which being the Island of Chira - Costa Rica's second largest island. The Gulf of Nicoya separates Guanacaste from mainland Costa Rica and is fed by the Tempisque River. Chira Island lies just off San Pablo, Guanacaste. The island is also a district in Puntarenas Canton, Costa Rica.

Ecologically, Chira contains the most intact biodiversity of tropical dry forest flora in Costa Rica, if not Central America.

Six villages make up the bulk of the population of Chira Island, located along the Northern edge of the island, from the West end to the East End. The eastern end of the island is dominated by mangrove swamps.

== Demographics ==
Historical population
Census	Pop.	±% p.a.
1883	46	—
1892	96	+8.52%
2000	1,534	+2.60%
2011	1,576	+0.25%
2022	1,819	+1.31%
Source: Instituto Nacional de Estadística y Censos; Centro Centroamericano de Población

For the 2011 census, Chira had a population of 1,576 inhabitants.

== Economy ==
The main economic activity is fishing, farming or work on the salt pans. These salt pans are popular with roseate spoonbills and other wading birds. Chira Island is bisected by a large estuary to the east leading into a canal through vast mangrove swamps. There is only a little accommodation on the island. From Puntarenas a daily boat goes to Isla Chira from the fish market. Hire-boats might be available in Pájaros or San Pablo.

Due to the reliance on marine resources and alternative industries being limited in number, significant pressure has been put on the island's natural resources. Due to this, a project has been developed to establish a bank of mollusks (Anadara tuberculosa and Anadara similis), a kind of oyster for artisan fishing, in order to create a commercially viable resource for long-term economic development. Additionally, attempts have been made to encourage various activities related with tourism, primarily using the Island's natural and geographical resources, such as the mangrove swamps and the Tempisque River, as well as the local culture.

Each year in June and July, there is a national bike race, as well as a running race, for those that want to explore the natural and unexplored beauty of the island.
