= Manzanillo District =

District in Puntarenas canton, Puntarenas province, Costa Rica

Manzanillo
- District
- Interactive map of Manzanillo
- Manzanillo district location in Costa Rica
- Coordinates: 10.1465583°N 85.0160159°W
- Country: Costa Rica
- Province: Puntarenas
- Canton: Puntarenas

Area
  - Total: 60.31 km^{2} (23.29 sq mi)
- Elevation: 12 m (39 ft)

Population (2011)
  - Total: 2,811
  - Density: 46.61/km^{2} (120.7/sq mi)
- Time zone: UTC−06:00
- Postal code: 60106

Manzanillo is a district of the Puntarenas canton, in the Puntarenas province of Costa Rica.

== Geography ==
Manzanillo has an area of 60.31 km^{2} (23.29 sq mi) and an elevation of 12 metres.

== Demographics ==
Historical population
Census	Pop.	±% p.a.
1927	661	—
1950	1,195	+2.61%
1963	1,662	+2.57%
1973	2,163	+2.67%
1984	2,868	+2.60%
2000	3,192	+0.67%
2011	2,811	−1.15%
2022	3,700	+2.53%
Source: Instituto Nacional de Estadística y Censos; Centro Centroamericano de Población

For the 2011 census, Manzanillo had a population of 2,811 inhabitants.

== Transportation ==
=== Road transportation ===
The district is covered by the following road routes:

- National Route 601
- National Route 602
