= Punta Banco =

- Village
- Location within Costa Rica
- Coordinates: 8°20′29″N 83°07′21″W
- Country: Costa Rica
- Province: Puntarenas
- Elevation: 32 m (105 ft)
- Time zone: -6
- Climate: Af

Punta Banco is a small seaside village in Costa Rica. It is located in the province of Puntarenas, in the southeastern part of the country, 210 km southeast of the capital of San José. The terrain inland is mainly hilly, but in the northwest is flat. The highest point nearby is 277 meters above sea level, 1.0 km east of Punta Banco.

== Weather ==
A tropical rainforest climate prevails in the area. The annual average temperature is 22 °C. The warmest month is March, when the average temperature is 24 °C, and the coldest is August, at 20 °C. Average annual rainfall is 4,365 millimeters. The rainiest month is October, with an average of 665 mm, and the driest is February, with an average of 83 mm.
