= Acapulco District =

District in Puntarenas canton, Puntarenas province, Costa Rica

Acapulco
- District
- Interactive map of Acapulco
- Acapulco district location in Costa Rica
- Coordinates: 10.1781625°N 84.8114705°W
- Country: Costa Rica
- Province: Puntarenas
- Canton: Puntarenas
- Creation: 18 June 1999

Area
  - Total: 111.2 km^{2} (42.9 sq mi)
- Elevation: 185 m (607 ft)

Population (2011)
  - Total: 1,296
  - Density: 11.65/km^{2} (30.19/sq mi)
- Time zone: UTC−06:00
- Postal code: 60114

Acapulco is a district of the Puntarenas canton, in the Puntarenas province of Costa Rica.

== History ==
Acapulco was created on 18 June 1999 by Decreto Ejecutivo 28000-G.

== Geography ==
Acapulco has an area of 111.2 km^{2} and an elevation of 185 metres.

== Demographics ==
Historical population
Census	Pop.	±% p.a.
2000	2,130	—
2011	1,296	−4.42%
2022	2,015	+4.09%
Source: Instituto Nacional de Estadística y Censos; Centro Centroamericano de Población

For the 2011 census, Acapulco had a population of 1,296 inhabitants.

== Transportation ==
=== Road transportation ===
The district is covered by the following road routes:

- National Route 1
- National Route 606
