= Quebrada Grande District =

District in Tilarán canton, Guanacaste province, Costa Rica

Quebrada Grande
- District
- Quebrada Grande district
- Quebrada Grande district location in Costa Rica
- Coordinates: 10.3827164°N 84.889753°W
- Country: Costa Rica
- Province: Guanacaste
- Canton: Tilarán

Area
  - Total: 33.72 km^{2} (13.02 sq mi)
- Elevation: 725 m (2,379 ft)

Population (2011)
  - Total: 2,700
  - Density: 80/km^{2} (210/sq mi)
- Time zone: UTC−06:00
- Postal code: 50802

Quebrada Grande is a district of the Tilarán canton, in the Guanacaste province of Costa Rica.

== Toponymy ==
The translation to English of Quebrada Grande is Big Creek, a self explanatory name of a riverine feature in the area.

== History ==
On 11 June 2020, the Cabeceras district was segregated from Quebrada Grande, by allocating 51.25 km^{2} (19.79 sq mi) from the originally 85.24 km^{2} (32.91 sq mi) of Quebrada Grande.

== Geography ==
Quebrada Grande has an area of 33.72 km^{2} and an elevation of 725 metres.

== Locations ==
- Poblados: Barrionuevo, Cabeceras de Cañas, Campos de Oro, Dos de Tilarán, Esperanza, Florida, Monte Olivos, Nubes, San Miguel, Turín (part), Vueltas

== Demographics ==
Historical population
Census	Pop.	±% p.a.
1927	1,127	—
1950	1,057	−0.28%
1963	1,933	+4.75%
1973	1,720	−1.16%
1984	1,879	+0.81%
2000	2,508	+1.82%
2011	2,700	+0.67%
2022	1,143	−7.52%
Source: Instituto Nacional de Estadística y Censos; Centro Centroamericano de Población

For the 2011 census, Quebrada Grande had a population of 2,700 inhabitants.

== Transportation ==
=== Road transportation ===
The district is covered by the following road routes:

- National Route 145
- National Route 606
- National Route 619
