= Puntarenas (canton) =

Canton in Puntarenas province, Costa Rica

- Canton
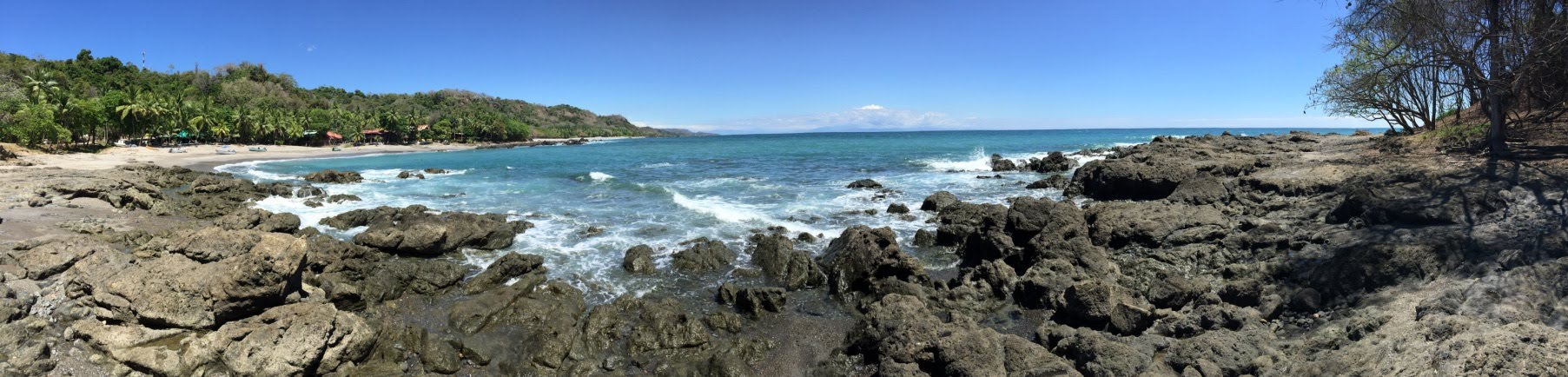
- View of Montezuma, a fishing village and eco-tourism hub near Cabo Blanco National Park in Cóbano, Puntarenas seen in February 2015.

- Flag Seal
- Puntarenas canton
- Country: Costa Rica
- Province: Puntarenas
- Creation: 7 December 1848
- Head city: Puntarenas
- Districts: Districts: Puntarenas; Pitahaya; Chomes; Lepanto; Paquera; Manzanillo; Guacimal; Barranca; Isla del Coco; Cóbano; Chacarita; Chira; Acapulco; El Roble; Arancibia

Government
  - Type: Municipality
  - Body: Municipalidad de Puntarenas

Area
  - Total: 1,842.33 km^{2} (711.33 sq mi)
- Elevation: 169 m (554 ft)

Population (2011)
  - Total: 115,019
  - Density: 62.4313/km^{2} (161.696/sq mi)
- Time zone: UTC−06:00
- Canton code: 601
- Website: www.puntarenas.go.cr

Puntarenas is a canton in the Puntarenas province of Costa Rica. The head city is Puntarenas.

== History ==
Puntarenas was created on 7 December 1848 by decree 167.

== Geography ==
Puntarenas has an area of 1,842.33 km^{2} (711.33 sq mi) and a mean elevation of 169 metres.

The canton includes areas on both sides of the Gulf of Nicoya and the island Isla del Coco. The southern portion of the Nicoya Peninsula is also in the canton, including the popular tourist areas of Tambor, Montezuma and Malpais.

== Districts ==
The canton of Puntarenas is subdivided into the following districts:

- Puntarenas
- Pitahaya
- Chomes
- Lepanto
- Paquera
- Manzanillo
- Guacimal
- Barranca
- Isla del Coco
- Cóbano
- Chacarita
- Chira
- Acapulco
- El Roble
- Arancibia

Monte Verde was the ninth district of the canton, on 29 September 2021 it was segregated to become a canton on its own, the Monteverde canton, the twelfth of Puntarenas province and eighty third of the country.

== Demographics ==
Historical population
| Census | Pop. | ±% p.a. |
|---|---|---|
| 1864 | 2,942 | — |
| 1883 | 4,018 | +1.65% |
| 1892 | 8,869 | +9.20% |
| 1927 | 14,746 | +1.46% |
| 1950 | 31,074 | +3.29% |
| 1963 | 55,592 | +4.58% |
| 1973 | 65,562 | +1.66% |
| 1984 | 74,135 | +1.12% |
| 2000 | 102,504 | +2.05% |
| 2011 | 115,019 | +1.05% |
| 2022 | 141,697 | +1.91% |
Source: Instituto Nacional de Estadística y Censos; Centro Centroamericano de Población

For the 2011 census, Puntarenas had a population of 115,019 inhabitants.

== Transportation ==
=== Road transportation ===
The canton is covered by the following road routes:

- National Route 1
- National Route 17
- National Route 21
- National Route 23
- National Route 132
- National Route 160
- National Route 163
- National Route 601
- National Route 602
- National Route 603
- National Route 604
- National Route 605
- National Route 606
- National Route 619
- National Route 620
- National Route 621
- National Route 623
- National Route 624
