= San Isidro District, Montes de Oro =

District in Montes de Oro canton, Puntarenas province, Costa Rica

San Isidro
- District
- San Isidro district
- San Isidro district location in Costa Rica
- Coordinates: 10.0499788°N 84.7200275°W
- Country: Costa Rica
- Province: Puntarenas
- Canton: Montes de Oro

Area
  - Total: 57.87 km^{2} (22.34 sq mi)
- Elevation: 150 m (490 ft)

Population (2011)
  - Total: 3,403
  - Density: 58.80/km^{2} (152.3/sq mi)
- Time zone: UTC−06:00
- Postal code: 60403

San Isidro is a district of the Montes de Oro canton, in the Puntarenas province of Costa Rica.

== Geography ==
San Isidro has an area of 57.87 km^{2} (22.34 sq mi) and an elevation of 150 metres.

== Demographics ==
Historical population
Census	Pop.	±% p.a.
1927	610	—
1950	890	+1.66%
1963	1,440	+3.77%
1973	1,867	+2.63%
1984	2,003	+0.64%
2000	2,853	+2.24%
2011	3,403	+1.62%
2022	4,732	+3.04%
Source: Instituto Nacional de Estadística y Censos; Centro Centroamericano de Población

For the 2011 census, San Isidro had a population of 3,403 inhabitants.

== Transportation ==
=== Road transportation ===
The district is covered by the following road routes:

- National Route 1
- National Route 144
- National Route 604
