= Pitahaya District =

District in Puntarenas canton, Puntarenas province, Costa Rica

Pitahaya
- District
- Pitahaya district
- Pitahaya district location in Costa Rica
- Coordinates: 10.0450797°N 84.8377589°W
- Country: Costa Rica
- Province: Puntarenas
- Canton: Puntarenas

Area
  - Total: 109.66 km^{2} (42.34 sq mi)
- Elevation: 10 m (33 ft)

Population (2011)
  - Total: 2,211
  - Density: 20.16/km^{2} (52.22/sq mi)
- Time zone: UTC−06:00
- Postal code: 60102

Pitahaya is a district of the Puntarenas canton, in the Puntarenas province of Costa Rica.

== Geography ==
Pitahaya has an area of 109.66 km^{2} and an elevation of 10 metres.

== Demographics ==
Historical population
Census	Pop.	±% p.a.
1892	248	—
1927	1,048	+4.20%
1950	1,619	+1.91%
1963	3,320	+5.68%
1973	3,387	+0.20%
1984	3,502	+0.30%
2000	1,822	−4.00%
2011	2,211	+1.77%
2022	2,916	+2.55%
Source: Instituto Nacional de Estadística y Censos; Centro Centroamericano de Población

For the 2011 census, Pitahaya had a population of 2,211 inhabitants.

== Transportation ==
=== Road transportation ===
The district is covered by the following road routes:

- National Route 1
- National Route 604
