= Cabeceras District, Tilarán =

District in Tilarán canton, Guanacaste province, Costa Rica

Cabeceras
- District
- Interactive map of Cabeceras
- Cabeceras district location in Costa Rica
- Coordinates: 10.3576°N 84.8741°W
- Country: Costa Rica
- Province: Guanacaste
- Canton: Tilarán
- Creation: 11 June 2020

Area
  - Total: 51.25 km^{2} (19.79 sq mi)
- Elevation: 725 m (2,379 ft)
- Time zone: UTC−06:00
- Postal code: 50808

Cabeceras is a district of the Tilarán canton, in the Guanacaste province of Costa Rica.

== History ==
Cabeceras was created on 11 June 2020 by Ley 20965. Originally part of Quebrada Grande district in the same Tilarán canton, of which it was allocated 51.25 km^{2} (19.79 sq mi).

The district has all the basic services such as schools, a high school, EBAIS (health services), ASADA (community managed potable water services), cemetery, soccer pitch, local business, coffee producers cooperative and a milk producers association.

== Geography ==
Cabeceras has an area of 51.25 km^{2} (19.79 sq mi) and an elevation of 725 metres.

== Demographics ==
Historical population
Census	Pop.	±% p.a.
2022	1,641	—
Source: Instituto Nacional de Estadística y Censos; Centro Centroamericano de Población

For the 2011 census, Cabeceras had not been created, its inhabitant were part of Quebrada Grande.

== Transportation ==
=== Road transportation ===
The district is covered by the following road routes:

- Route 145
- Route 606
- Route 619.
