= Arancibia District =

District in Puntarenas canton, Puntarenas province, Costa Rica

Arancibia
- District
- Interactive map of Arancibia
- Arancibia district location in Costa Rica
- Coordinates: 10.2255926°N 84.7136123°W
- Country: Costa Rica
- Province: Puntarenas
- Canton: Puntarenas
- Creation: 9 November 2000

Area
  - Total: 45.04 km^{2} (17.39 sq mi)
- Elevation: 560 m (1,840 ft)

Population (2011)
  - Total: 665
  - Density: 14.8/km^{2} (38.2/sq mi)
- Time zone: UTC−06:00
- Postal code: 60116

Arancibia is a district of the Puntarenas canton, in the Puntarenas province of Costa Rica.

== History ==
Arancibia was created on 9 November 2000 by Ley 8044.

== Geography ==
Arancibia has an area of 45.04 km^{2} (17.39 sq mi) and an elevation of 560 metres.

== Demographics ==
Historical population
Census	Pop.	±% p.a.
2011	665	—
2022	854	+2.30%
Source: Instituto Nacional de Estadística y Censos; Centro Centroamericano de Población

For the 2011 census, Arancibia had a population of 665 inhabitants.
