= Chomes =

District in Puntarenas province, Costa Rica

- District
- Interactive map of Chomes
- Chomes district location in Costa Rica
- Coordinates: 10.0987546°N 84.9251608°W
- Country: Costa Rica
- Province: Puntarenas
- Canton: Puntarenas

Area
  - Total: 120.3 km^{2} (46.4 sq mi)
- Elevation: 4 m (13 ft)

Population (2011)
  - Total: 5,522
  - Density: 45.90/km^{2} (118.9/sq mi)
- Time zone: UTC−06:00
- Postal code: 60103

Chomes is a district of the Puntarenas canton, in the Puntarenas province of Costa Rica.

== Geography ==
Chomes has an area of 120.3 km^{2} and an elevation of 4 metres.

== Demographics ==
Historical population
Census	Pop.	±% p.a.
1883	145	—
1892	322	+9.27%
1927	1,923	+5.24%
1950	1,888	−0.08%
1963	1,991	+0.41%
1973	2,378	+1.79%
1984	2,686	+1.11%
2000	4,166	+2.78%
2011	5,522	+2.59%
2022	7,604	+2.95%
Source: Instituto Nacional de Estadística y Censos; Centro Centroamericano de Población

For the 2011 census, Chomes had a population of 5,522 inhabitants.

== Transportation ==
=== Road transportation ===
The district is covered by the following road routes:

- National Route 1
- National Route 132
- National Route 601
- National Route 603
- National Route 605
