= Monteverde =

Canton in Puntarenas province, Costa Rica

- Canton and District
- English: Monte Verde ('green mountain')
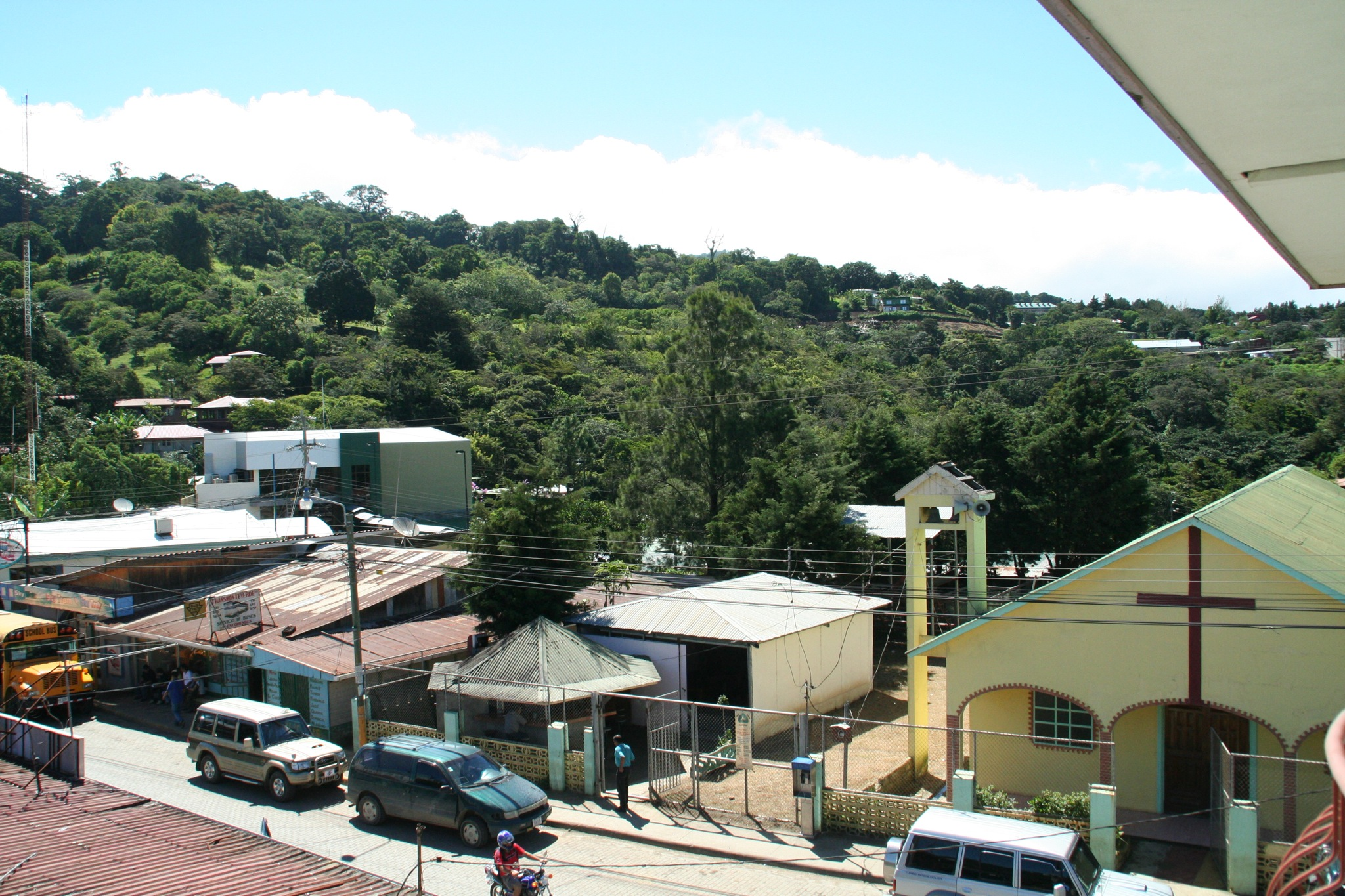
- Main commercial street in Santa Elena, the hub of Monteverde.
- Canton of Monteverde
- Monteverde canton location in Costa Rica
- Coordinates: 10°17′27″N 84°49′31″W
- Country: Costa Rica
- Province: Puntarenas
- Canton creation: 29 September 2021
- Head city: Santa Elena
- Districts: Districts: Monteverde

Government
  - Type: Municipality
  - Body: Municipalidad de Monteverde
  - Mayor: Yeudy Miguel Ramírez Brenes (PRSC)

Area
  - Total: 53.05 km^{2} (20.48 sq mi)
- Elevation: 1,330 m (4,360 ft)

Population (2011)
  - Total: 4,155
  - Density: 78.32/km^{2} (202.9/sq mi)
- Time zone: UTC−06:00

Monteverde is the twelfth canton of the Puntarenas province of Costa Rica, located in the Cordillera de Tilarán (Tilarán range). Roughly a four-hour drive from the Central Valley, Monteverde is one of the country's major ecotourism destinations, with the Reserva Biológica Bosque Nuboso Monteverde (Monteverde Cloud Forest Reserve) being the largest, in addition to several other natural attractions which draw considerable numbers of tourists and naturalists, both from Costa Rica and abroad.

National Geographic has called the Monteverde Cloud Forest "the jewel in the crown of cloud forest reserves". Newsweek ranked Monteverde the world's No. 14 "place to remember before it disappears"; by popular vote in Costa Rica, Monteverde was deemed one of the seven natural wonders of the nation, along with Isla del Coco, Volcán Arenal, Cerro Chirripó, Río Celeste, Tortuguero, and Volcán Poás. US News & World Report ranked Monteverde's Cloud Forest Preserve as the 3rd best place to visit in Costa Rica.

Santa Elena is the head town in the region, serving as the area's principal tourist and visitors' hub. Together with the nearby neighborhood of Cerro Plano, and the community of Monteverde proper, visitors have diverse options for accommodations, dining, guided tours, and more when visiting the area's numerous reserves and natural attractions.

== Toponymy ==
Monteverde translates directly to "green mountain", in English, a tribute to the region's wealth of natural beauty. For comparison, the word's French equivalent would be Vert mont or Mont vert, montanha verde in Portuguese. Officially, the name is Monte Verde — written as two words.

== Climate ==
Monteverde primarily consists of tropical montane cloud forest. At an elevation of roughly 1,400 m (4,600 ft) above sea level, the climate is never hot, as trade winds from the Caribbean Sea consistently blow across the mountains. The region's mean annual temperature is 18 °C (64 °F) 17). Annual precipitation averages around 3,000 mm (118 in), and ambient humidity oscillates between 74% and 97% (Nadkarni 2000: 34).

== History ==
Various pre-Columbian artifacts testify to the existence of early populations of Clovis Native Americans, who once farmed in villages in the area and hunted the forests, ca. 3000 BC. From around 3300 BC to 2000 BC, nearby tribes of the Arenal area experienced a population decline, but re-established villages in the region between 2000 and 500 BC. Agriculture intensified in the centuries between 500 BC and 300 CE, with simple chiefdom societies replacing the formerly smaller, tribal settlements; some level of deforestation accompanied this rise in population, farming and horticulture. Early stone foundations dating to this period can also be found. Jade, and creating valuable objects with the stone, was a prized material and defining characteristic of these villages. From 300 to 800 CE, complex chiefdoms supplanted simpler chiefdoms as more intricate villages appeared; along with early modern examples of cemeteries, businesses and public squares, goldsmiths were seen as extremely valuable. intertribal trade and conflict. Around 1300, a general decline in population occurred, possibly due to the Arenal Volcano's increased activity.

After the Spanish made landfall in 1502, Costa Rica endured two generations of warfare. Total indigenous populations in what is now Costa Rica fell drastically, from an estimated 400,000 pre-European contact to 80,000 within less than 50 years of contact. Countless innocent people lost their lives for a multitude of reasons, from deplorable living conditions brought about by enslavement (and harsh forced labor and servitude) to outright sadistic punishments, and even murder, of anyone who challenged the conquistadores. Many thousands more quickly succumbed to the vast array of Old World pathogens and infectious diseases that their systems had no immunity against, including diseases such as measles, influenza, chickenpox, bubonic plague, typhus, scarlet fever, pneumonia, syphilis and malaria. However, in a somewhat cruel "twist of fate", unlike neighboring Nicaragua and Panama, Costa Rica did not yield considerable amounts of indigenous labor or mineral resources, and thus the region experienced colonization at a much slower rate than many other Spanish colonies.

=== Early 20th century ===
During the first three decades of the 20th century, from roughly 1900–1930, Creole populations arrived in small numbers to the area that is now Monteverde; many men worked within the Guacimal gold mines; many more, still, with their wives and families, provided these miners and their greater communities with needed goods and services. Some families also settled in the lower, warmer valley of nearby San Luís.

=== 1950s and forward ===
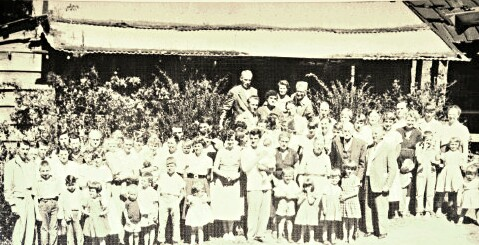
Quakers in Monteverde, 1950

What is now considered Monteverde was founded by Quakers from the United States whose pacifist values led them to defy the American draft before the Korean War. The majority of these settlers hailed from Fairhope, Alabama, and included some non-Quaker pacifists and conscientious objectors. The spokesman of the group was Hubert Mendenhall, a dairyman who had visited Costa Rica in 1949 as part of a farmer's tour. These Quakers and pacifists chose the area for its cool climate, which would facilitate dairy farming, due to the country's non-violent, army-free constitution, and its friendly Costa Rican inhabitants. The Quakers stewarded and farmed a large tract of land, part of which they eventually set aside for conservation, today the Reserva Biológica Bosque Nuboso Monteverde (Monteverde Cloud Forest Biological Reserve). This has become a major tourist attraction.

=== 2005 bank raid ===
On March 8, 2005, a group of three armed Nicaraguan men raided and attempted to rob the Santa Elena branch of the state National Bank (Banco Nacional). A guard killed two of the armed men. However, one assailant held bank customers hostage for 28 hours. When authorities successfully attempted to retake the bank, a senior police officer and nine civilians died, and only one of the attackers survived. This event raised tensions between Nicaraguans and Costa Ricans nationwide and prompted higher security in many national banks.

=== Canton creation ===
As a district of Puntarenas canton, Monteverde had its own local government, a Municipal District Council, due to the long distance from the offices of the municipality of Puntarenas canton. As a result, its inhabitants pushed for Monteverde to become its own canton.

On 4 August 2021, the Legislative Assembly approved the file N.º 21618, which was then signed into law N.º 10019 by President Carlos Alvarado Quesada on 29 September 2021, which segregates the district from Puntarenas canton to become Monteverde canton. However, due to law N.º 6068 the change was deferred to after 3 April 2022 as it was not possible to change the Territorial Administrative Division fourteen months before elections, which was the case due to the second round of the 2022 Costa Rican general election held on that date.

The canton voted for its first municipal government and mayor in the 2024 Costa Rican municipal elections. PRSC won the local election.

=== Today ===
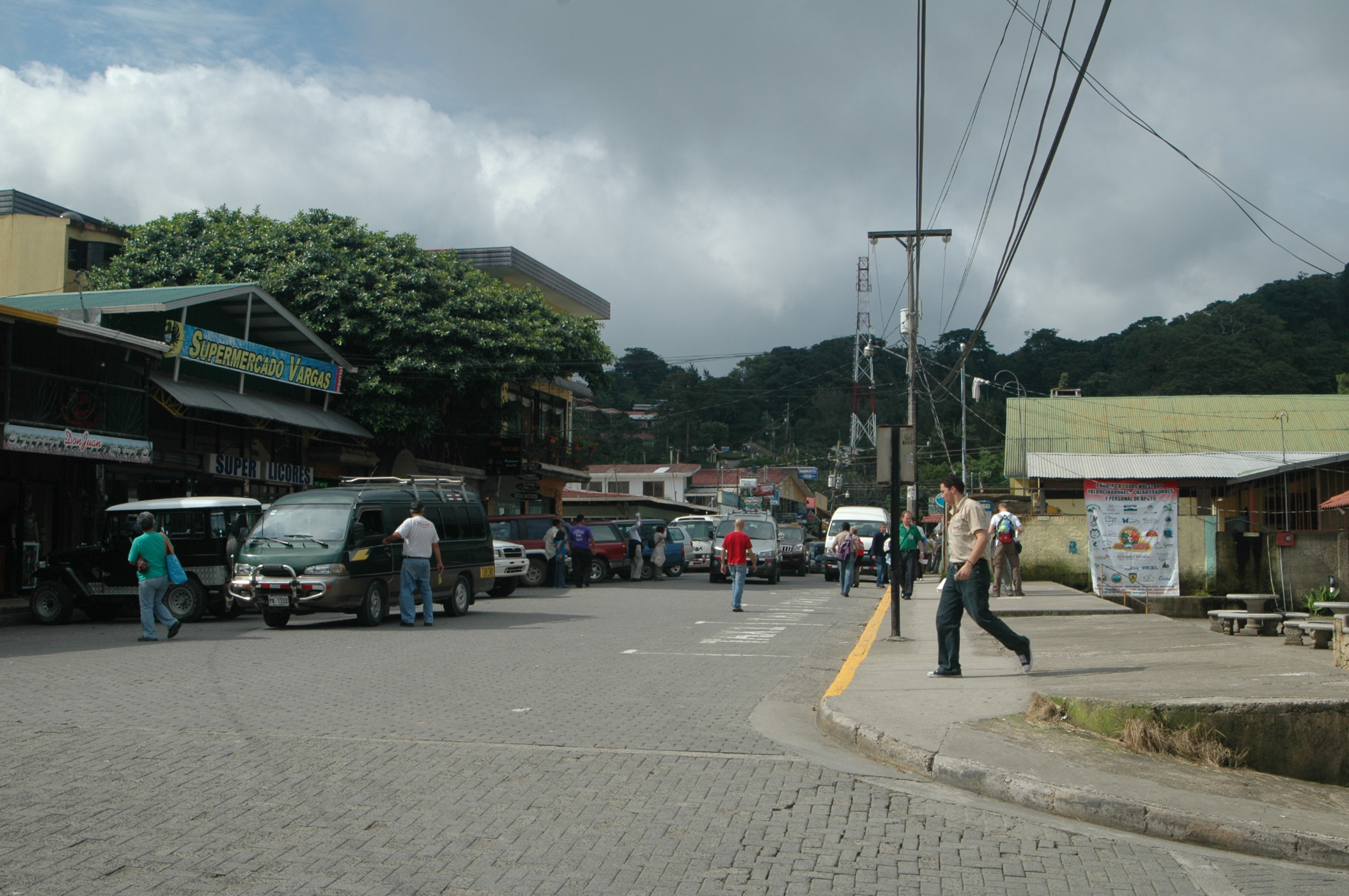
Santa Elena, Monteverde's larger neighbor and primary provider of goods and lodging

In recent years, the area's rapidly increasing numbers of tourists has brought a sizable influx of Costa Ricans from other towns and cities. Now, an estimated 250,000 tourists visit Monteverde a year. Improved goods and services, including partially paved roads, have arrived in recent years. In 2007, Costa Ricans voted Monteverde one of Costa Rica's Seven Wonders, along with Isla del Coco, Tortuguero, Arenal Volcano, Cerro Chirripó, Rio Celeste and Poás Volcano.

== Geography ==
The district of Monteverde has an area of 53.05 km^{2} and an average elevation of 1,330 metres.

== Administrative territorial division ==
The canton of Monteverde is subdivided into only one district, occupying the same area as the whole canton:

1. Monteverde, with postal code 61201

Santa Elena is the head town (cabecera de distrito). The district also includes the neighborhoods and towns of Cerro Plano, Cuesta Blanca, La Lindora, Los Llanos, Monte Verde, and San Luis.

== Demographics ==
Historical population
Census	Pop.	±% p.a.
1984	1,467	—
2000	3,285	+5.17%
2011	4,155	+2.16%
2022	5,386	+2.39%
Source: Instituto Nacional de Estadística y Censos; Centro Centroamericano de Población

According to the 2011 census, Monteverde had a population of 4,155 inhabitants.

The official and most-spoken language is Spanish, as in the majority of Costa Rica. However, English-Spanish bilingualism is widespread due to the presence of Quakers and three bilingual schools.

== Education ==
The area has several public grade and middle schools. These include the Escuela Santa Elena, the Escuela Cerro Plano, and two schools in San Luis. The Colegio San Rafael and Colegio Técnico Professional (also known as the Colegio Santa Elena) are responsible for the majority of secondary education in the area.

Private education is fairly robust in the Monteverde region. In 1951, the Quakers constructed a Quaker Meeting house, which served as classrooms and a general store. This became known as Monteverde Friends School (MFS) and today offers bilingual education to Pre-K through 12th grade to roughly 120 students.

The Cloud Forest School (CFS), or Centro de Educación Creativa, founded in 1991, is a bilingual, secular, environmentally-focused private school that enrolls local and international students from Pre-K through 6th grade. The school sits on 106 acres of cloud forest. Over 80% of students are Costa Ricans, the majority of whom receive scholarship funding. The CFS is accredited by the government of Costa Rica.

The small private Adventist school, the Escuela Adventista, is also bilingual.

While there is only one institution of higher education in Monteverde, the Distance State University (UNED), the region is home to a considerable number of local and foreign undergraduate and graduate programs. These include the Monteverde Institute, EAP, CIEE, and the University of Georgia (see below). Most residents of Monteverde pursue higher education in the Central Valley at institutions such as the University of Costa Rica.

Monteverde is also home to a substantial number of foreign-born scientists. A long-term resident of the town is the former lead guitarist of British new wave band Japan, Robert Dean, working as a professional ornithology writer.

== Transportation ==
=== Road transportation ===
The district is connected to and transversed by the following road routes:

- National Route 606
- National Route 619
- National Route 620

== Economy ==
=== Agriculture ===
Agriculture has historically been the area's main source of income and sustenance for both Costa Ricans and Quakers. The original Creole populations relied mostly on subsistence agriculture and trade with the mining town of Guacimal. Initially locals hunted tapirs, deer, pacas, monkeys, and birds, but diminished those populations. They turned to pigs, corn, beans, vegetables, fruits, herbs, and livestock. In the 1950s, both Quakers and Costa Ricans produced garlic, beef, flax, and homestead cheese. Quakers took advantages of the infrastructure improvements of the 1960s and exported cheese and beef to the rest of the country. However, due to overgrazing, the dairy industry declined in the 1970s. This led the population to turn to coffee. By the mid-1990s, coffee farmers were receiving some of the highest prices in the world for their coffee beans. In the mid-1990s 210 families were contributing milk to the local dairy factory, with a revenue of $5.2 million.

=== Tourism ===
Tourism is a growing sector in Monteverde's economy. In 1975, the region received fewer than one hundred visitors. This increased to around 50,000 in the mid-1990s. In recent years, the average has risen to 250,000 yearly tourists. Hotels, taxis, guides, and other tourist-geared services have operated since the early 1990s.

== Places of interest ==
=== Nature ===
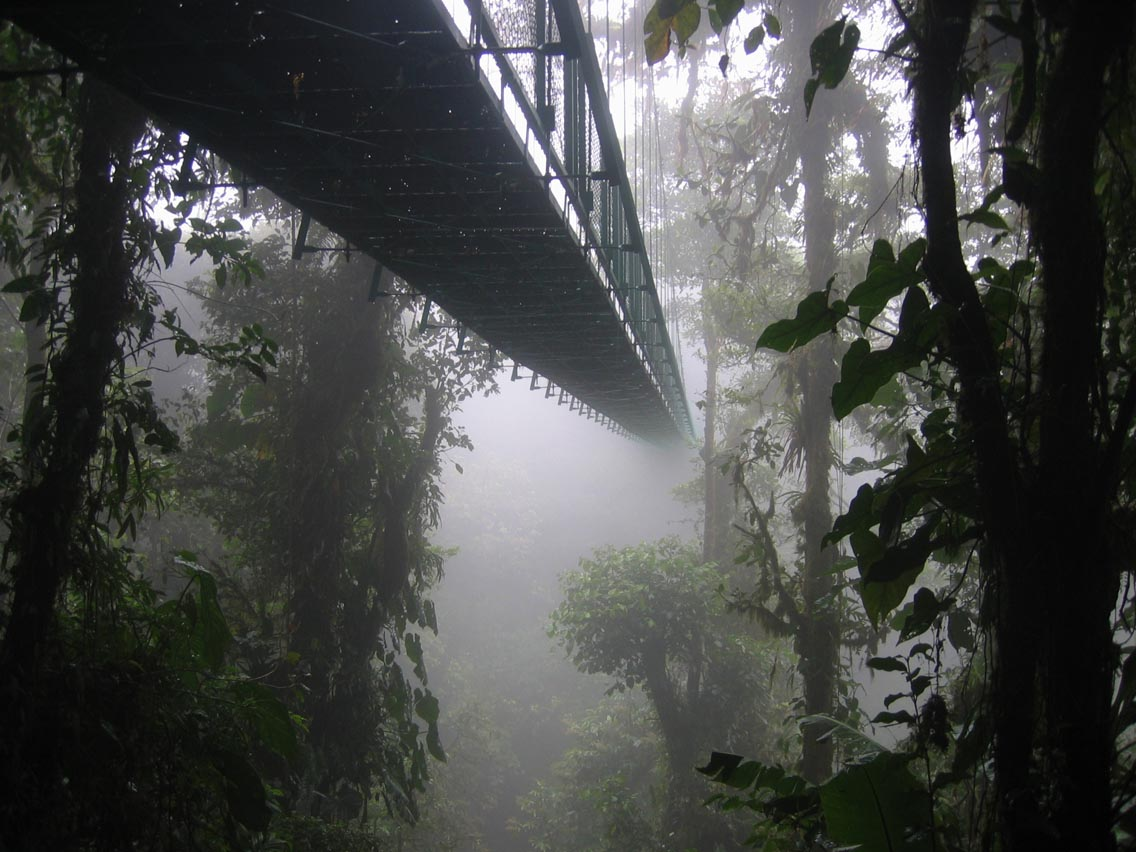
One of the many eco-tourism oriented suspension bridges in the area. (Selvatura Park)

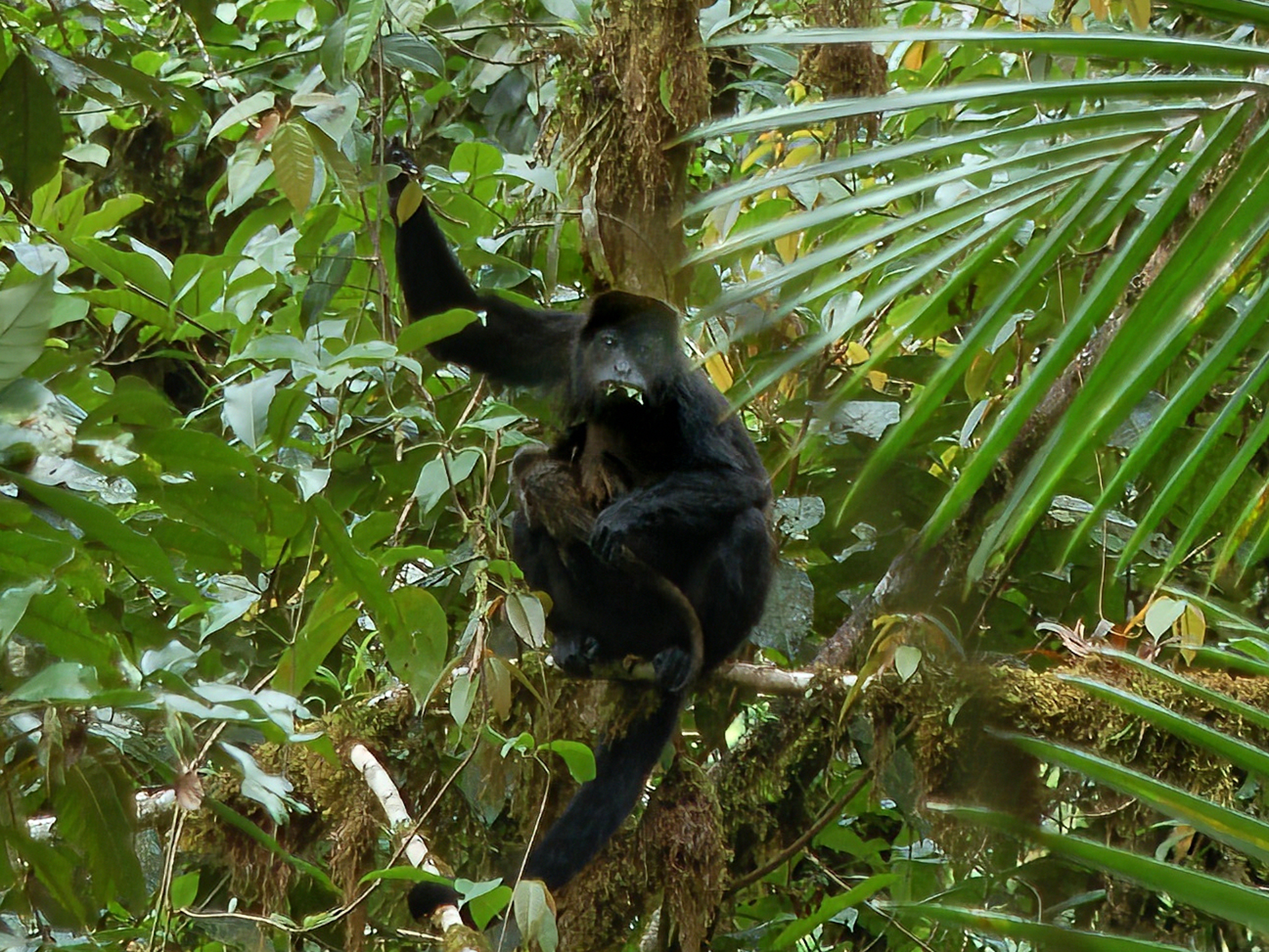
A Red Howler with child near the Monteverde Cloud Forest Biological Reserve

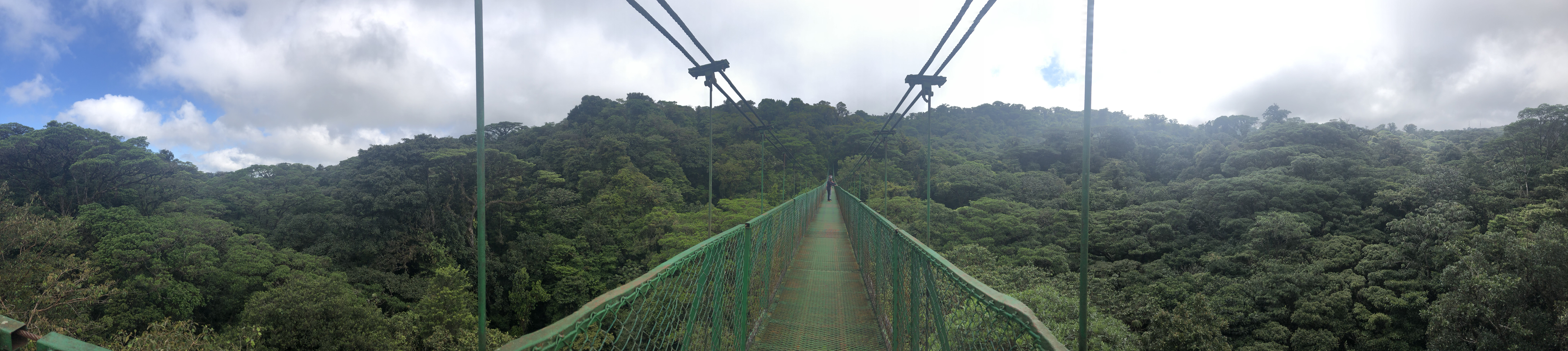
One of the Skywalk Hanging Bridges at Sky Monteverde in Costa Rica

Due to the area's cloud forests and rain forests (including seven different ecological life zones), Monteverde has become a major part of the Costa Rican tourist trail – despite difficult access. Readers of the country's leading newspaper La Nación voted it one of the "7 Wonders of Costa Rica". Of Monteverde's quarter-million annual tourists, around 70,000 tourists visit the reserve.

The bulk of Monteverde's cloud forest can be found in the Monteverde Cloud Forest Reserve. The area around the park entrance is the most visited, and features six main trails, which total 13 km, are well-kept and easy to access. The reserve features a large network of less-accessible trails and a number of research stations, two of which house ten persons each, as well as one larger station that can house as many as forty-three persons, though these are now restricted to use by researchers only.

To the east of Monteverde lies the Children's Eternal Rainforest (El Bosque Eterno de los Niños) conservation area, a project funded by schools and children from all over the world. The Bosque Eterno is the largest preserve in the area with 22,000 hectares (54,000 acres). Farther north is the Reserva Santa Elena. This area attracts fewer tourists than the Monteverde Reserve, but offers a field station and views of Arenal Volcano.

=== Preserve ===
The massive 10,500-hectare (26,000-acre) Monteverde Cloud Forest Reserve is the region's main draw, due largely to its excellent virgin and semi-virgin environment and world-class biodiversity.

Geographically straddling the Continental Divide along the Tilarán Mountain Range, the preserve's microclimate is governed by northeast trade winds that create a persistent orographic cloud belt, sustaining extreme epiphyte density and canopy water interception.

Scientists have determined this region to be home to the planet's largest number of orchids, at 500, with 34 being recent discoveries. Fifty-eight species of amphibians, including the extinct Monteverde-endemic golden toad, have been found here. This area is also a stop for ninety-one species of migratory birds. The famed quetzal resides here seasonally. Monteverde's one-hundred-and-thirty-four mammal species include representatives from both North and South America, including six species of marsupials, three muskrats, at least fifty-eight bats, three primates, seven edentates, two rabbits, one ground hog, three species of squirrels, one species of spiny mouse, at least fifteen species of long-tailed rats and mice (family Muridae), one species of porcupine, one species of agouti, one paca, two canids, five mustelids, four species of procyonids, six species of felines, two species of wild pigs, two species of deer, and one tapir.

=== UGA Costa Rica ===
The University of Georgia uses a 155-acre satellite campus outside of the Monteverde region in the lower San Luis community. UGA Costa Rica operates numerous study abroad programs, ecological and forestry research, as well as ecotourism via on-campus lodging, the Ecolodge San Luis. Additionally, UGA Costa Rica is responsible for various conservation and sustainability initiatives in the San Luis Valley, namely its Carbon Offset Program and reforestation efforts in the Pájaro Campana Biological Corridor. In May 2019, ownership of the campus was transferred to CIEE (Council on International Educational Exchange), which only hosts University of Georgia and other academic groups, not tourists.
