= National Route 606 (Costa Rica) =

Road in Costa Rica

National Tertiary Route 606
- Ruta nacional terciaria 606

Route information
- Maintained by Ministry of Public Works and Transport
- Length: 52.880 km (32.858 mi)

Major junctions
- South end: Route 1 (Sardinal)
- Route 605
- North end: Santa Elena, Monteverde

Location
- Country: Costa Rica

Highway system
- National Road Network of Costa Rica
← Route 605	→ Route 607

National Tertiary Route 606, or just Route 606 (Spanish: Ruta Nacional Terciaria 606, or Ruta 606) is a National Road Route of Costa Rica, located in the Guanacaste, Puntarenas provinces. It is known as Carretera a Monteverde, between Route 1 in Puntarenas province and Monteverde. It is the main access road to the dairy farms and tourist-attraction rain forests of Monteverde.

== Description ==
In Guanacaste province the route covers Abangares canton (Sierra district) and Tilarán canton (Quebrada Grande, Cabeceras districts).

In Puntarenas province the route covers Puntarenas canton (Guacimal, Monte Verde, Acapulco districts).

== History ==
While it has historically been mostly a gravel road, there have been recent efforts to asphalt the road in its entirety due to its use by tourists.

Work started in June 2017, with a projected end date of September 2018, to stabilize and widen some sections of the road. Work also began to pave the remaining 17-kilometer dirt and gravel section from Guacimal to Santa Elena. However, some of the residents have concerns about the effect of increased traffic and visitors on the area.

By December 2018, the contractor Grupo Orosi had a 22% advance on the work, with a three-month delay after the original project end date. The contract was canceled due to the lack of progress and financial uncertainties of the contractor. There were also concerns by the National Laboratory of Materials and Structural Models (LANAMME) about the quality of the material in use. The last segment remains unpaved as of October 2019, while awaiting a new contract with a different company to continue the work, projected to start in May 2020.

Landslides are common in the rainy season.
