= El Roble District =

District in Puntarenas canton, Puntarenas province, Costa Rica

El Roble
- District
- Interactive map of El Roble
- El Roble district location in Costa Rica
- Coordinates: 9.977073°N 84.7442821°W
- Country: Costa Rica
- Province: Puntarenas
- Canton: Puntarenas
- Creation: 14 September 1999

Area
  - Total: 7.94 km^{2} (3.07 sq mi)
- Elevation: 4 m (13 ft)

Population (2011)
  - Total: 15,759
  - Density: 1,980/km^{2} (5,140/sq mi)
- Time zone: UTC−06:00
- Postal code: 60115

El Roble is a district of the Puntarenas canton, in the Puntarenas province of Costa Rica.

== History ==
El Roble was created on 14 September 1999 by Ley 7909.

== Geography ==
El Roble has an area of 7.94 km^{2} (3.07 sq mi) and an elevation of 4 metres.

== Demographics ==
Historical population
Census	Pop.	±% p.a.
2011	15,759	—
2022	23,953	+3.88%
Source: Instituto Nacional de Estadística y Censos; Centro Centroamericano de Población

At the 2011 census, El Roble had a population of 15,759 inhabitants.

== Transportation ==
=== Road transportation ===
The district is covered by the following road routes:

- National Route 17
- National Route 23
