= Guacimal =

District in Puntarenas canton, Puntarenas province, Costa Rica

- District
- Interactive map of Guacimal
- Guacimal district location in Costa Rica
- Coordinates: 10.2211318°N 84.8316769°W
- Country: Costa Rica
- Province: Puntarenas
- Canton: Puntarenas
- Creation: 14 December 1939

Area
  - Total: 114.49 km^{2} (44.20 sq mi)
- Elevation: 368 m (1,207 ft)

Population (2011)
  - Total: 923
  - Density: 8.06/km^{2} (20.9/sq mi)
- Time zone: UTC−06:00
- Postal code: 60107

Guacimal is a district of the Puntarenas canton, in the Puntarenas province of Costa Rica.

== History ==
Guacimal was created on 14 December 1939 by Decreto Ejecutivo 45.

== Geography ==
Guacimal has an area of 114.49 km^{2} and an elevation of 368 metres.

== Demographics ==
Historical population
Census	Pop.	±% p.a.
1950	2,294	—
1963	2,826	+1.62%
1973	1,258	−7.77%
1984	1,119	−1.06%
2000	990	−0.76%
2011	923	−0.64%
2022	1,339	+3.44%
Source: Instituto Nacional de Estadística y Censos; Centro Centroamericano de Población

For the 2011 census, Guacimal had a population of 923 inhabitants.

== Transportation ==
=== Road transportation ===
The district is covered by the following road routes:

- National Route 605
- National Route 606
