= National Route 17 (Costa Rica) =

National Road Route in Costa Rica

National Primary Route 17
- Ruta nacional primaria 17

Route information
- Maintained by Ministry of Public Works and Transport
- Length: 16.710 km (10.383 mi)

Location
- Country: Costa Rica
- Provinces: Puntarenas

Highway system
- National Road Network of Costa Rica
← Route 14	→ Route 18

National Primary Route 17, or just Route 17 (Spanish: Ruta Nacional Primaria 17, or Ruta 17) is a National Road Route of Costa Rica, located in the Puntarenas province.

== Description ==
In Puntarenas province the route covers Puntarenas canton (Puntarenas, Barranca, Chacarita, and El Roble districts).
