= National Route 604 (Costa Rica) =

National Road Route in Costa Rica

National Tertiary Route 604
- Ruta nacional terciaria 604

Route information
- Maintained by Ministry of Public Works and Transport
- Length: 18.005 km (11.188 mi)

Location
- Country: Costa Rica
- Provinces: Puntarenas

Highway system
- National Road Network of Costa Rica
| ← Route 603 | → Route 605 |

National Tertiary Route 604, or just Route 604 (Spanish: Ruta Nacional Terciaria 604, or Ruta 604) is a National Road Route of Costa Rica, located in the Puntarenas province.

== Description ==
In Puntarenas province, the route covers Puntarenas canton (Puntarenas, Pitahaya districts) and Montes de Oro canton (San Isidro district).
