= National Route 602 (Costa Rica) =

National Road Route in Costa Rica

National Tertiary Route 602
- Ruta nacional terciaria 602

Route information
- Maintained by Ministry of Public Works and Transport
- Length: 13.090 km (8.134 mi)

Location
- Country: Costa Rica
- Provinces: Guanacaste, Puntarenas

Highway system
- National Road Network of Costa Rica
← Route 601	→ Route 603

National Tertiary Route 602, or just Route 602 (Spanish: Ruta Nacional Terciaria 602, or Ruta 602) is a National Road Route of Costa Rica, located in the Guanacaste, Puntarenas provinces.

== Description ==
In Guanacaste Province, the route covers Abangares canton (Las Juntas district).

In Puntarenas Province, the route covers Puntarenas canton (Manzanillo district).
