= National Route 619 (Costa Rica) =

National Road Route in Costa Rica

National Tertiary Route 619
- Ruta nacional terciaria 619

Route information
- Maintained by Ministry of Public Works and Transport
- Length: 11.985 km (7.447 mi)

Location
- Country: Costa Rica
- Provinces: Guanacaste, Puntarenas

Highway system
- National Road Network of Costa Rica
← Route 618	→ Route 620

National Tertiary Route 619, or just Route 619 (Spanish: Ruta Nacional Terciaria 619, or Ruta 619) is a National Road Route of Costa Rica, located in the Guanacaste, Puntarenas provinces.

== Description ==
In Guanacaste province the route covers Tilarán canton (Quebrada Grande, Cabeceras districts).

In Puntarenas province the route covers Puntarenas canton (Monte Verde district).
