= Miramar District =

District in Montes de Oro canton, Puntarenas province, Costa Rica

Miramar
- District
- Interactive map of Miramar
- Miramar district location in Costa Rica
- Coordinates: 10.1099684°N 84.7376696°W
- Country: Costa Rica
- Province: Puntarenas
- Canton: Montes de Oro

Area
  - Total: 110.64 km^{2} (42.72 sq mi)
- Elevation: 340 m (1,120 ft)

Population (2011)
  - Total: 8,298
  - Density: 75.00/km^{2} (194.2/sq mi)
- Time zone: UTC−06:00
- Postal code: 60401

Miramar is a district of the Montes de Oro canton, in the Puntarenas province of Costa Rica. The inhabitants of the Miramar district are officially known as Miramareños. The region is recognized for its extensive natural landscapes and its prominent role as a major center for national sports.

== Etymology ==
The community of Miramar was historically known by the name Los Quemados (The Burned Ones). Two primary theories exist regarding the origin of this designation: the first suggests it referred to the unique coloration of the local mountains, which gave the visual impression of having been scorched; the second attributes the name to the annual practice of hunters setting fire to the hillsides.

The modern name, Miramar, was proposed by Francisco de Paula Amador during a visit to the region, inspired by the panoramic views of the Gulf of Nicoya visible from the area. According to Executive Decree No. 18, issued on April 23, 1897, the name 'Los Quemados' was officially replaced by 'Montes de Oro' for the district, while 'Miramar' was designated for the primary administrative center.

== Location ==
Miramar is situated in the central portion of the Montes de Oro canton. It is bordered to the north by the district of La Unión and to the south by San Isidro. To the west, it shares a boundary with the Puntarenas canton, while to the east it borders the cantons of Esparza and San Ramón (within the province of Alajuela).

== Geography ==
Miramar has an area of 110.64 km^{2} and an elevation of 340 metres.

== Demographics ==
Historical population
Census	Pop.	±% p.a.
1927	1,665	—
1950	2,680	+2.09%
1963	3,480	+2.03%
1973	3,785	+0.84%
1984	4,191	+0.93%
2000	6,842	+3.11%
2011	8,298	+1.77%
2022	10,172	+1.87%
Source: Instituto Nacional de Estadística y Censos; Centro Centroamericano de Población

For the 2011 census, Miramar had a population of 8,298 inhabitants.

== Transportation ==
=== Road transportation ===
The district is covered by the following road routes:

- National Route 1
- National Route 144
- National Route 615
