= National Route 601 (Costa Rica) =

National Road Route in Costa Rica

National Tertiary Route 601
- Ruta nacional terciaria 601

Route information
- Maintained by Ministry of Public Works and Transport
- Length: 38.335 km (23.820 mi)

Location
- Country: Costa Rica
- Provinces: Guanacaste, Puntarenas

Highway system
- National Road Network of Costa Rica
← Route 510	→ Route 602

National Tertiary Route 601, or just Route 601 (Spanish: Ruta Nacional Terciaria 601, or Ruta 601) is a National Road Route of Costa Rica, located in the Guanacaste, Puntarenas provinces.

== Description ==
In Guanacaste province the route covers Abangares canton (Las Juntas, Colorado districts).

In Puntarenas province the route covers Puntarenas canton (Chomes, Manzanillo districts).
