= National Route 605 (Costa Rica) =

National Road Route in Costa Rica

National Tertiary Route 605
- Ruta nacional terciaria 605

Route information
- Maintained by Ministry of Public Works and Transport
- Length: 14.895 km (9.255 mi)

Location
- Country: Costa Rica
- Provinces: Puntarenas

Highway system
- National Road Network of Costa Rica
← Route 604	→ Route 606

National Tertiary Route 605, or just Route 605 (Spanish: Ruta Nacional Terciaria 605, or Ruta 605) is a National Road Route of Costa Rica, located in the Puntarenas province.

== Description ==
In Puntarenas province the route covers Puntarenas canton (Chomes, Guacimal districts).
