= Las Juntas District =

District in Abangares canton, Guanacaste province, Costa Rica

Las Juntas
- District
- Interactive map of Las Juntas
- Las Juntas district location in Costa Rica
- Coordinates: 10.2370966°N 85.0230036°W
- Country: Costa Rica
- Province: Guanacaste
- Canton: Abangares

Area
  - Total: 229.16 km^{2} (88.48 sq mi)
- Elevation: 150 m (490 ft)

Population (2011)
  - Total: 9,482
  - Density: 41.38/km^{2} (107.2/sq mi)
- Time zone: UTC−06:00
- Postal code: 50701

Las Juntas is a district of the Abangares canton, in the Guanacaste province of Costa Rica.

== Geography ==
Las Juntas has an area of 229.16 km^{2} and an elevation of 150 metres.

== Villages ==
Administrative center of the district is the town of Las Juntas.

Other villages are Blanco, Concepción, Coyolito (partly), Chiqueros, Desjarretado, Huacas (partly), Irma, Jarquín (partly), Jesús, Lajas, Limonal, Limonal Viejo, Matapalo, Naranjos Agrios, Palma, Peña, Puente de Tierra, Rancho Alegre (partly), Rancho Ania (partly), San Cristóbal, San Juan Chiquito, Tortugal, and Zapote.

== Demographics ==
Historical population
Census	Pop.	±% p.a.
1927	1,931	—
1950	3,431	+2.53%
1963	4,253	+1.67%
1973	5,486	+2.58%
1984	6,568	+1.65%
2000	8,612	+1.71%
2011	9,482	+0.88%
2022	11,335	+1.64%
Source: Instituto Nacional de Estadística y Censos; Centro Centroamericano de Población

For the 2011 census, Las Juntas had a population of 9,482 inhabitants.

== Transportation ==
=== Road transportation ===
The district is covered by the following road routes:

- National Route 1
- National Route 18
- National Route 145
- National Route 601
- National Route 602
