= National Route 145 (Costa Rica) =

National Road Route in Costa Rica

National Secondary Route 145
- Ruta nacional secundaria 145

Route information
- Maintained by Ministry of Public Works and Transport
- Length: 47.150 km (29.298 mi)

Location
- Country: Costa Rica
- Provinces: Guanacaste

Highway system
- National Road Network of Costa Rica
← Route 144	→ Route 146

National Secondary Route 145, or just Route 145 (Spanish: Ruta Nacional Secundaria 145, or Ruta 145) is a National Road Route of Costa Rica located in the Guanacaste province.

== Description ==
In Guanacaste province the route covers Abangares canton (Las Juntas and Sierra districts) and Tilarán canton (Tilarán, Quebrada Grande, and Cabeceras districts).
