= National Route 620 (Costa Rica) =

National Road Route in Costa Rica

National Tertiary Route 620
- Ruta nacional terciaria 620

Route information
- Maintained by Ministry of Public Works and Transport
- Length: 5.705 km (3.545 mi)

Location
- Country: Costa Rica
- Provinces: Puntarenas

Highway system
- National Road Network of Costa Rica
← Route 619	→ Route 621

National Tertiary Route 620, or just Route 620 (Spanish: Ruta Nacional Terciaria 620, or Ruta 620) is a National Road Route of Costa Rica, located in the Puntarenas province.

== Description ==
In Puntarenas province the route covers Puntarenas canton (Monte Verde district).
