= National Route 23 (Costa Rica) =

National Road Route in Costa Rica

National Primary Route 23
- Ruta nacional primaria 23

Route information
- Maintained by Ministry of Public Works and Transport
- Length: 12.665 km (7.870 mi)

Location
- Country: Costa Rica
- Provinces: Puntarenas

Highway system
- National Road Network of Costa Rica
← Route 22	→ Route 27

National Primary Route 23, or just Route 23 (Spanish: Ruta Nacional Primaria 23, or Ruta 23) is a National Road Route of Costa Rica located in the Puntarenas province.

== Description ==
In Puntarenas province the route covers Puntarenas canton (Barranca and El Roble districts) and Esparza canton (Caldera district).
