= National Route 621 (Costa Rica) =

National Road Route in Costa Rica

National Tertiary Route 621
- Ruta nacional terciaria 621

Route information
- Maintained by Ministry of Public Works and Transport
- Length: 4.165 km (2.588 mi)

Location
- Country: Costa Rica
- Provinces: Puntarenas

Highway system
- National Road Network of Costa Rica
← Route 620	→ Route 622

National Tertiary Route 621, or just Route 621 (Spanish: Ruta Nacional Terciaria 621, or Ruta 621) is a National Road Route of Costa Rica, located in the Puntarenas province.

== Description ==
In Puntarenas province the route covers Puntarenas canton (Paquera district).
