= National Route 132 (Costa Rica) =

National Road Route in Costa Rica

National Secondary Route 132
- Ruta nacional secundaria 132

Route information
- Maintained by Ministry of Public Works and Transport
- Length: 10.155 km (6.310 mi)

Location
- Country: Costa Rica
- Provinces: Puntarenas

Highway system
- National Road Network of Costa Rica
← Route 131	→ Route 133

National Secondary Route 132, or just Route 132 (Spanish: Ruta Nacional Secundaria 132, or Ruta 132) is a National Road Route of Costa Rica located in the Puntarenas province.

== Description ==
In Puntarenas province the route covers Puntarenas canton (Chomes district).
