= Chacarita District =

District in Puntarenas province, Costa Rica

Chacarita
- District
- Interactive map of Chacarita
- Chacarita district location in Costa Rica
- Coordinates: 9.9841838°N 84.7693637°W
- Country: Costa Rica
- Province: Puntarenas
- Canton: Puntarenas
- Creation: 18 July 1994

Area
  - Total: 4.92 km^{2} (1.90 sq mi)
- Elevation: 4 m (13 ft)

Population (2011)
  - Total: 17,434
  - Density: 3,540/km^{2} (9,180/sq mi)
- Time zone: UTC−06:00
- Postal code: 60112

Chacarita is a district of the Puntarenas canton, in the Puntarenas province of Costa Rica.

== History ==
Chacarita was created on 18 July 1994 by Ley 7422.

== Geography ==
Chacarita has an area of 4.92 km^{2} and an elevation of 4 metres.

== Demographics ==
Historical population
Census	Pop.	±% p.a.
1883	102	—
1892	132	+2.91%
2000	23,163	+4.90%
2011	17,434	−2.55%
2022	17,661	+0.12%
Source: Instituto Nacional de Estadística y Censos; Centro Centroamericano de Población

At the 2011 census, Chacarita had a population of 17,434 inhabitants.

== Transportation ==
=== Road transportation ===
The district is covered by the following road routes:

- National Route 17
