= National Route 603 (Costa Rica) =

National Road Route in Costa Rica

National Tertiary Route 603
- Ruta nacional terciaria 603

Route information
- Maintained by Ministry of Public Works and Transport
- Length: 10.157 km (6.311 mi)

Location
- Country: Costa Rica
- Provinces: Puntarenas

Highway system
- National Road Network of Costa Rica
← Route 602	→ Route 604

National Tertiary Route 603, or just Route 603 (Spanish: Ruta Nacional Terciaria 603, or Ruta 603) is a National Road Route of Costa Rica, located in the Puntarenas province.

== Description ==
In Puntarenas province the route covers Puntarenas canton (Chomes district).
