= National Route 615 (Costa Rica) =

National Road Route in Costa Rica

National Tertiary Route 615
- Ruta nacional terciaria 615

Route information
- Maintained by Ministry of Public Works and Transport
- Length: 11.065 km (6.875 mi)

Location
- Country: Costa Rica
- Provinces: Puntarenas

Highway system
- National Road Network of Costa Rica
← Route 614	→ Route 616

National Tertiary Route 615, or just Route 615 (Spanish: Ruta Nacional Terciaria 615, or Ruta 615) is a National Road Route of Costa Rica, located in the Puntarenas province.

== Description ==
In Puntarenas province the route covers Montes de Oro canton (Miramar, La Unión districts).
