= La Unión District, Montes de Oro =

District in Montes de Oro canton, Puntarenas province, Costa Rica

La Unión
- District
- Interactive map of La Unión
- La Unión district location in Costa Rica
- Coordinates: 10.2091042°N 84.714113°W
- Country: Costa Rica
- Province: Puntarenas
- Canton: Montes de Oro

Area
  - Total: 78.33 km^{2} (30.24 sq mi)
- Elevation: 620 m (2,030 ft)

Population (2011)
  - Total: 1,249
  - Density: 15.95/km^{2} (41.30/sq mi)
- Time zone: UTC−06:00
- Postal code: 60402

La Unión is a district of the Montes de Oro canton, in the Puntarenas province of Costa Rica.

== Geography ==
La Unión has an area of 78.33 km^{2} (30.24 sq mi) and an elevation of 620 metres.

== Demographics ==
Historical population
Census	Pop.	±% p.a.
1927	2,037	—
1950	2,025	−0.03%
1963	1,696	−1.35%
1973	1,327	−2.42%
1984	1,250	−0.54%
2000	1,464	+0.99%
2011	1,249	−1.43%
2022	1,491	+1.62%
Source: Instituto Nacional de Estadística y Censos; Centro Centroamericano de Población

For the 2011 census, La Unión had a population of 1,249 inhabitants.

== Transportation ==
=== Road transportation ===
The district is covered by the following road routes:

- National Route 615
