= Montes de Oro (canton) =

Canton in Puntarenas province, Costa Rica

- Canton
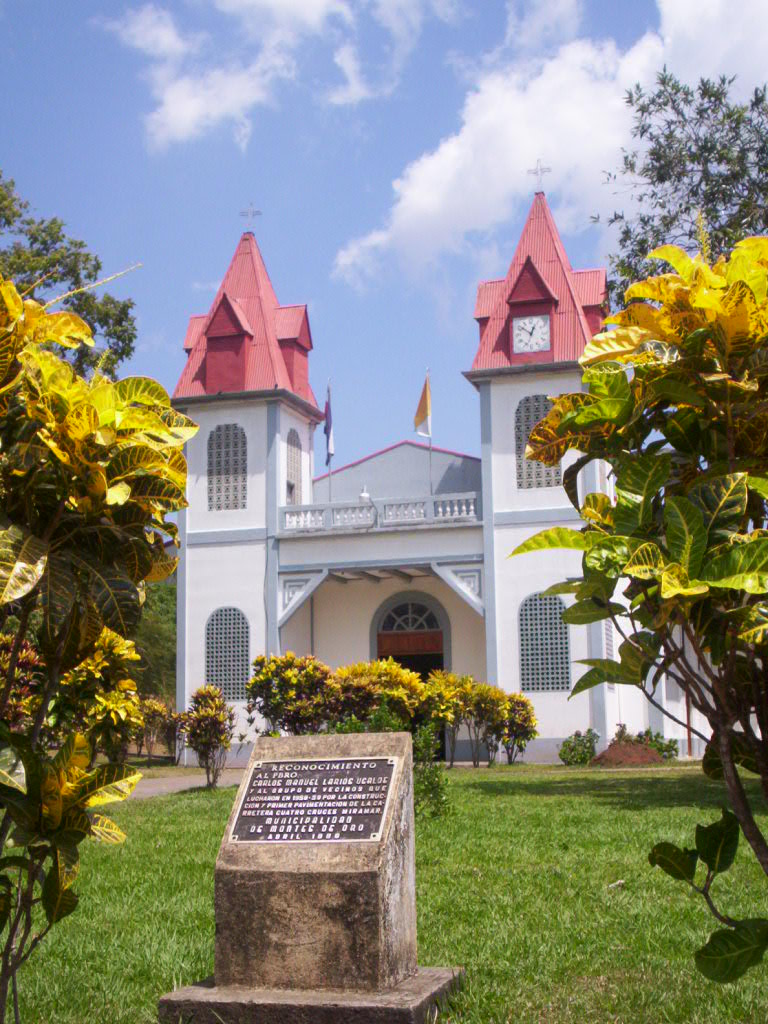
- Miramar Church, in Montes de Oro

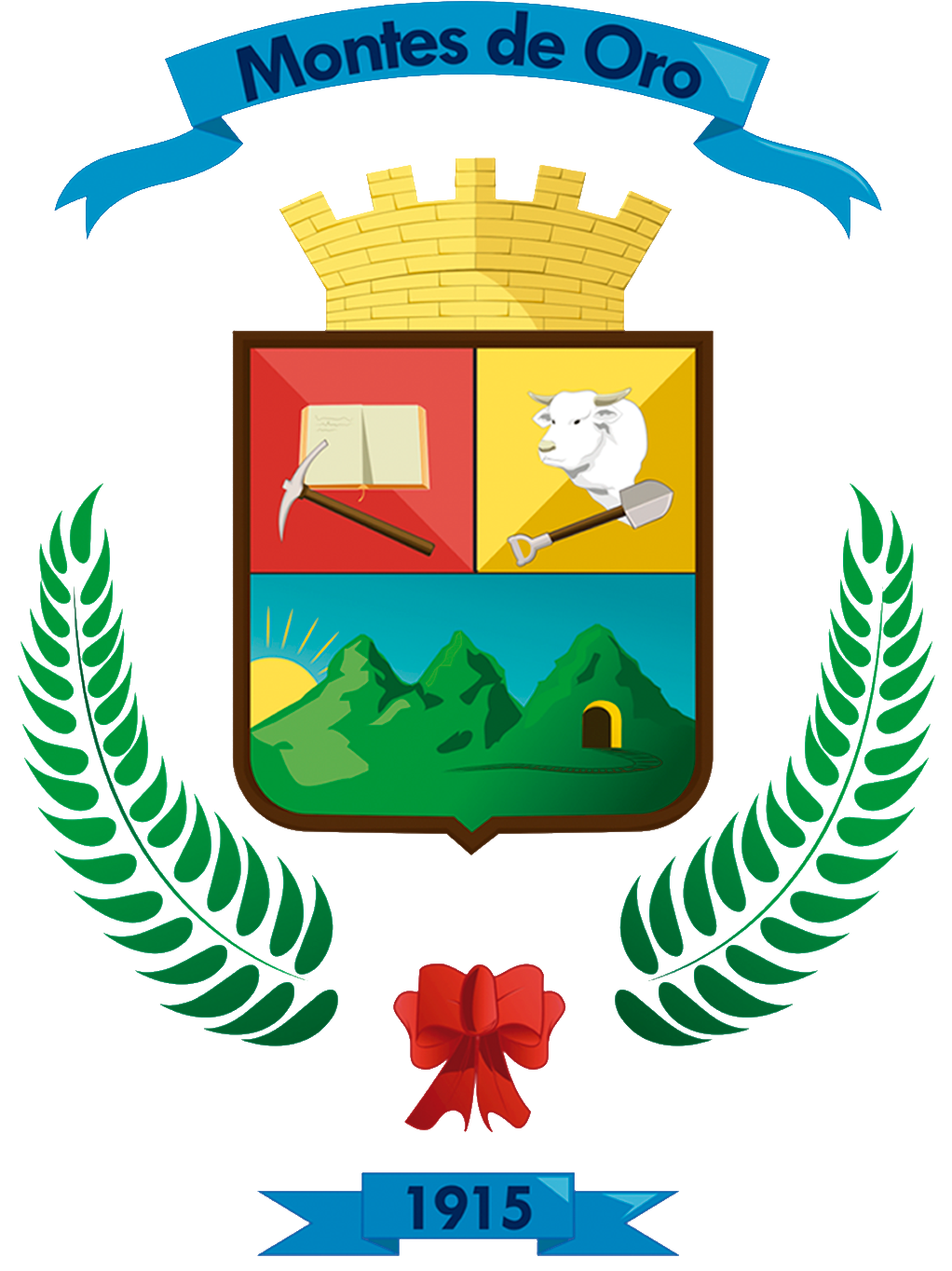
- Flag Seal
- Montes de Oro canton
- Montes de Oro canton location in Costa Rica
- Coordinates: 10.1469106°N 84.733311°W
- Country: Costa Rica
- Province: Puntarenas
- Creation: 17 July 1915
- Head city: Miramar
- Districts: Districts: Miramar; La Unión; San Isidro

Government
  - Type: Municipality
  - Body: Municipalidad de Montes de Oro

Area
  - Total: 244.76 km^{2} (94.50 sq mi)
- Elevation: 370 m (1,210 ft)

Population (2011)
  - Total: 12,950
  - Density: 52.91/km^{2} (137.0/sq mi)
- Time zone: UTC−06:00
- Canton code: 604
- Website: www.munimontesdeoro.go.cr

Montes de Oro is a canton in the Puntarenas province of Costa Rica. The head city is in Miramar district.

== History ==
Montes de Oro was created by Decree 42 on 17 July, 1915.

== Geography ==
Montes de Oro has an area of 244.76 km^{2} (94.50 sq mi) and a mean elevation of 370 metres.

The mountainous canton lies in the Cordillera de Tilarán northeast of the city of Puntarenas. It is limited on the north by the Aranjuez River. The San Miguel River and Tiacinto River delineate the southern boundary.

== Districts ==
The canton of Montes de Oro is subdivided into the following districts:

1. Miramar
2. La Unión
3. San Isidro

== Demographics ==
Historical population
Census	Pop.	±% p.a.
1927	4,312	—
1950	5,595	+1.14%
1963	6,616	+1.30%
1973	6,979	+0.54%
1984	7,444	+0.59%
2000	11,159	+2.56%
2011	12,950	+1.36%
2022	16,395	+2.17%
Source: Instituto Nacional de Estadística y Censos; Centro Centroamericano de Población

For the 2011 census, Montes de Oro had a population of 12,950 inhabitants.

== Transportation ==
=== Road transportation ===
The canton is covered by the following road routes:

- National Route 1
- National Route 144
- National Route 604
- National Route 615
