= National Route 144 (Costa Rica) =

National Road Route in Costa Rica

National Secondary Route 144
- Ruta nacional secundaria 144

Route information
- Maintained by Ministry of Public Works and Transport
- Length: 7.285 km (4.527 mi)

Location
- Country: Costa Rica
- Provinces: Puntarenas

Highway system
- National Road Network of Costa Rica
← Route 143	→ Route 145

National Secondary Route 144, or just Route 144 (Spanish: Ruta Nacional Secundaria 144, or Ruta 144) is a National Road Route of Costa Rica located in the Puntarenas province.

== Description ==
In Puntarenas province, the route covers Montes de Oro canton (Miramar and San Isidro districts).
