= Puntarenas District =

District in Puntarenas canton, and city of Puntarenas province, Costa Rica

Puntarenas
- District
- Puntarenas district
- Puntarenas district location in Costa Rica
- Coordinates: 9.9895775°N 84.8931864°W
- Country: Costa Rica
- Province: Puntarenas
- Canton: Puntarenas

Area
  - Total: 34.6 km^{2} (13.4 sq mi)
- Elevation: 4 m (13 ft)

Population (2011)
  - Total: 8,335
  - Density: 241/km^{2} (624/sq mi)
- Time zone: UTC−06:00
- Postal code: 60101

Puntarenas is a district of the Puntarenas canton, in the Puntarenas province of Costa Rica.

== Geography ==
Puntarenas has an area of 34.6 km^{2} and an elevation of 4 metres.

== Demographics ==
Historical population
Census	Pop.	±% p.a.
1864	1,502	—
1883	2,024	+1.58%
1892	2,538	+2.55%
1927	7,790	+3.26%
1950	15,660	+3.08%
1963	26,082	+4.00%
1973	26,940	+0.32%
1984	29,224	+0.74%
2000	9,559	−6.75%
2011	8,335	−1.24%
2022	6,653	−2.03%
Source: Instituto Nacional de Estadística y Censos; Centro Centroamericano de Población

At the 2011 census, Puntarenas had a population of 8,335 inhabitants.

== Transportation ==
=== Road transportation ===
The district is covered by the following road routes:

- National Route 17
- National Route 604
