= University of Georgia College of Environment & Design =

Academic unit of the University of Georgia

Coordinates: 33.95528°N 83.37269°W

University of Georgia College of Environment and Design
- Type: Public
- Established: 1928 - First classes
- Dean: Sonia Hirt
- Location: Athens, Georgia, United States
- Website: College Homepage

The University of Georgia College of Environment and Design (CED) is a college within the University of Georgia (UGA) in Athens, Georgia, United States.

== History ==
Landscape Architecture has been taught at UGA since 1928. The former School of Environmental Design (SED) transitioned to become the College of Environment and Design (CED) in 2001. It was the first new college at UGA since 1969. The CED provides nationally accredited, inventive, and demanding programs in landscape architecture, historic preservation, environmental planning & design, and environmental ethics, and has been consistently rated as one of the top landscape architecture schools in the United States. The school was named the #1 Landscape Architecture program for undergraduates in the nation, as well as #3 for post-grad studies in the list of top 15 Landscape Architecture Schools for 2006. On July 1, 2007, the Institute of Ecology separated from the College after joining with the former SED in 2001, becoming the Odum School of Ecology, the first stand-alone academic school of Ecology in the United States.

CED contains the Owens Library, as well as the Circle Gallery. The library's Hubert Bond Owens and John Linley Image Collections contain photographic records of numerous Georgia architectural sites and landscapes ranging in date from the 1940s to the 1980s. City planning guidelines from 1989 or later for various Georgia municipalities are also part of the library's collections.

== Departments ==
The following units are part of CED:

- Environmental Ethics Certificate Program
- Founders Memorial Garden and House

== Centers ==
- Center for Community Design & Preservation (CCDP)
- Cultural Landscape Laboratory (CLL)

== Degrees offered ==
The College of Environment and Design offers numerous degree tracks.

=== Undergraduate ===
The following undergraduate degree is offered by the CED:

- Bachelor of Landscape Architecture (B.L.A.)

=== Graduate degrees ===
- Master of Landscape Architecture
- Master of Historic Preservation
- Master of Environmental Planning and Design
- Ph.D. in Environmental Design and Planning

== Notable alumni ==
- Harvard Graduate School of Design faculty member and landscape architect George Hargreaves received a B.L.A. degree from CED in 1977.
