= Gulf of Nicoya =

Inlet of the Pacific Ocean in Costa Rica

Coordinates: 9.8°N 84.8°W

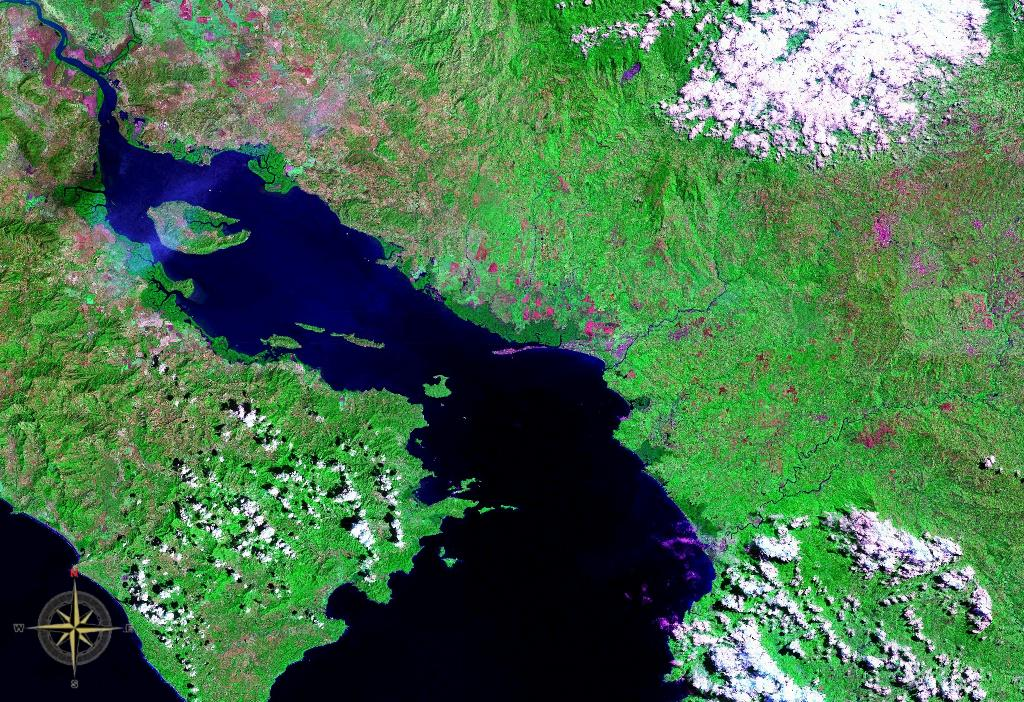
Gulf of Nicoya seen from space (false color)

The Gulf of Nicoya (Spanish: Golfo de Nicoya) is an inlet of the Pacific Ocean. It separates the Nicoya Peninsula from the mainland of Costa Rica, and encompasses a marine and coastal landscape of wetlands, rocky islands and cliffs.

The first Spanish landing in Nicaragua took place here in 1519.

== Islands ==
- Chira Island
- Venado Island
- Isla Caballo
- Isla Bejuco
- Isla San Lucas
- Isla Gitana
- Tortuga Island, Costa Rica

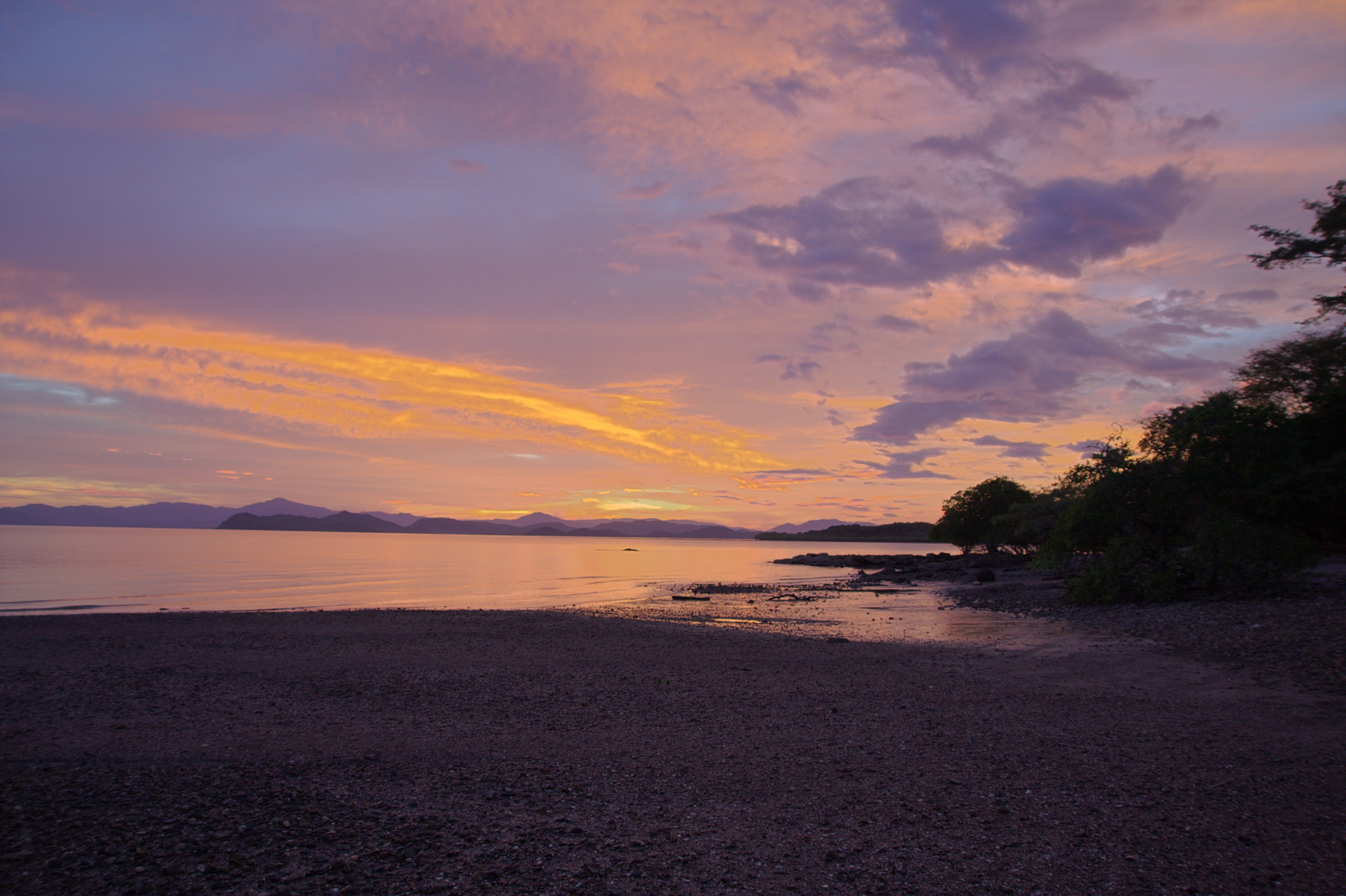
Sunset over the Nicoya Peninsula and Gulf of Nicoya
