= CIEE =

Nonprofit study abroad organization

Council on International Educational Exchange
- Native name: CIEE
- Company type: Nonprofit organization
- Founded: 1947 (79 years ago)
- Headquarters: Portland, Maine, U.S.
- Website: Official website

The Council on International Educational Exchange (CIEE) is a 501(c)(3) non-profit organization headquartered in Portland, Maine, that operates programs worldwide and focuses on promoting cross‑cultural understanding through international education initiatives.

According to their mission statement, CIEE’s programs are designed to help people gain understanding, acquire knowledge, and develop skills for living in a globally interdependent and culturally diverse world.

== History ==
CIEE was founded in 1947 in the aftermath of World War II as the Council on Student Travel (CST), a consortium of educational and cultural organizations working to restore international educational exchange programs that had been suspended during the war. Early initiatives focused on facilitating student travel to Europe, including the Student Ship Project, which used converted troopships to transport students and educators across the Atlantic and provide shipboard cultural orientation programs.

In 1951, CST merged with the Council on Correlation of International Educational Enterprises and established offices in New York City. During the 1950s the organization expanded its activities from transportation logistics into broader educational programming, including orientation programs, academic exchange initiatives, and support for international students traveling to and from the United States.

In 1967 the organization adopted the name Council on International Educational Exchange (CIEE) to reflect its focus on international education.

CIEE launched its Summer Work Travel program in 1969 after being designated by the U.S. Department of State as the first sponsor of the J-1 Summer Work Travel visa category. The program, now known as CIEE BridgeUSA Summer Work Travel, enables university students from around the world to live and work in the United States during their academic breaks.

In 1984, following recommendations from CIEE, the U.S. Department of State created the J-1 Trainee visa category, allowing university students and recent graduates to participate in internship and training programs in the United States.

CIEE relocated its U.S. headquarters from New York City to Portland, Maine, in 2003. In 2015 the organization launched the first Open Campus Block Program in Berlin, a flexible study abroad model that was later expanded to cities including London, Paris, and Rome.

== Programs & Services ==
CIEE administers a diverse range of international education and cultural exchange programs for secondary school students, university students, and young professionals. Each year, approximately 50,000 participants take part in CIEE programs, including international students and professionals who travel to the United States and American participants who study, work, or travel abroad.

The organization operates college study abroad programs and high school exchange programs in cities across Europe, Asia, Africa, and the Americas. These programs are hosted at partner universities and CIEE study centers and may include semester, summer, and short-term academic experiences designed to support cultural immersion and global learning.

CIEE also administers programs under the U.S. Department of State’s J-1 visa cultural exchange framework, including Summer Work Travel, internship, trainee, camp counselor, and teacher exchange programs. Through its BridgeUSA Summer Work Travel program, the organization places international participants in seasonal employment in the United States while engaging in cultural exchange activities.1

== Governance ==
CIEE is governed by a board of directors composed of leaders from higher education, international education, and related fields. The board provides oversight of the organization’s strategy, programs, and finances.

The organization also maintains an International Program Advisory Council (IPAC), established in 2023. The Council consists of international education administrators and faculty from partner universities who advise CIEE leadership on study abroad program quality, program development, and emerging trends in international education.

== Global Presence ==
CIEE operates study centers and program locations in more than 45 cities in over 30 countries, including locations such as London, Berlin, Rome, Barcelona, Prague, Cape Town, Singapore, Shanghai, Tokyo, Sydney, and Buenos Aires. These locations support academic coursework, student services, and cultural programming for participants in CIEE study abroad and exchange programs. Programs are delivered through partnerships with local universities and institutions as well as through CIEE-operated study centers.

The organization’s global operations are coordinated from its U.S. headquarters in Portland, Maine, along with regional offices and program staff in host countries.

== See also ==
- NAFSA: Association of International Educators
- Institute of International Education
- AFS Intercultural Programs
- Fulbright Program
- J-1 visa
- International student
