= Cantons of Costa Rica =

Second-level administrative divisions of Costa Rica

Map of Central America with Costa Rica highlighted

Costa Rica is administratively divided into seven provinces which are subdivided into 84 cantons, and these are further subdivided into districts. Cantons are the only administrative division in Costa Rica that possess local government in the form of municipalities. Each municipality has its own mayor and several representatives, all of them chosen via municipal elections every four years.

The original 14 cantons were established in 1848, and the number has risen gradually by the division of existing cantons. Law no. 4366 of 19 August 1969, which outlines the creation of administrative divisions of Costa Rica, states that new cantons may only be created if they have at least one percent of the republic's total population, which was 5,044,197 as of the latest estimate (2022). (Note: The Eleventh Population Census (2022) experienced significant issues, including problems stemming from the COVID-19 pandemic, resulting in only successfully sampling around 60% of homes and estimates having to be used.) The newest canton, Puerto Jiménez, was created on June 21, 2022, from the canton of Golfito.

According to the latest population estimate from the National Institute of Statistics and Census, the largest canton by population is the capital San José with a population of 352,381, while the smallest by population is Monteverde with 5,386 residents. The latest report from the National Geographic Institute listed the largest canton by land area as San Carlos, which spans 3,352.14 km^{2} (1,294.27 mi^{2}) and the smallest as Flores at 6.75 km^{2} (2.61 mi^{2}).

== Political structure ==
Each canton is controlled by a government unit called Municipalidad. The term reflects the fact that the cantons in Costa Rica have approximately the same function as municipios ("municipalities") in many other Spanish-speaking countries. This administrative unit consists of two bodies: a municipal council (Concejo Municipal) and an executive officer called a mayor (alcalde / alcaldesa municipal), a title that was introduced in 1998.

The mayor's main duties are to liaise with the municipal council, district councils and the entire administrative apparatus of the canton, and to approve and implement the decisions taken by the municipal council. The number of members of the municipal council varies from one canton to another, and they are elected by local elections held every four years. The head of the council is titled the municipal president (presidente municipal). The council's main task is to manage the canton at the local level, and is responsible for planning basic policies and establishing budgets. More specifically, the responsibilities include urban and agricultural planning and organizing cultural affairs, health care, education and industry. Each municipal president appoints a number of working commissions that deal with issues specific to the municipality.

=== Cities in Costa Rica ===
According to the Executive Decree N°41548-MGP (Declara oficial para efectos administrativos, la aprobación de la División Territorial Administrativa de la República), a city in Costa Rica is a ceremonial title awarded to a district or districts which contain the administrative center regardless of factors such as population, population density, or economic indicators. This designation is also known as cabecera de cantón, head city of the canton.

== Cantons ==
Largest cantons of Costa Rica by population

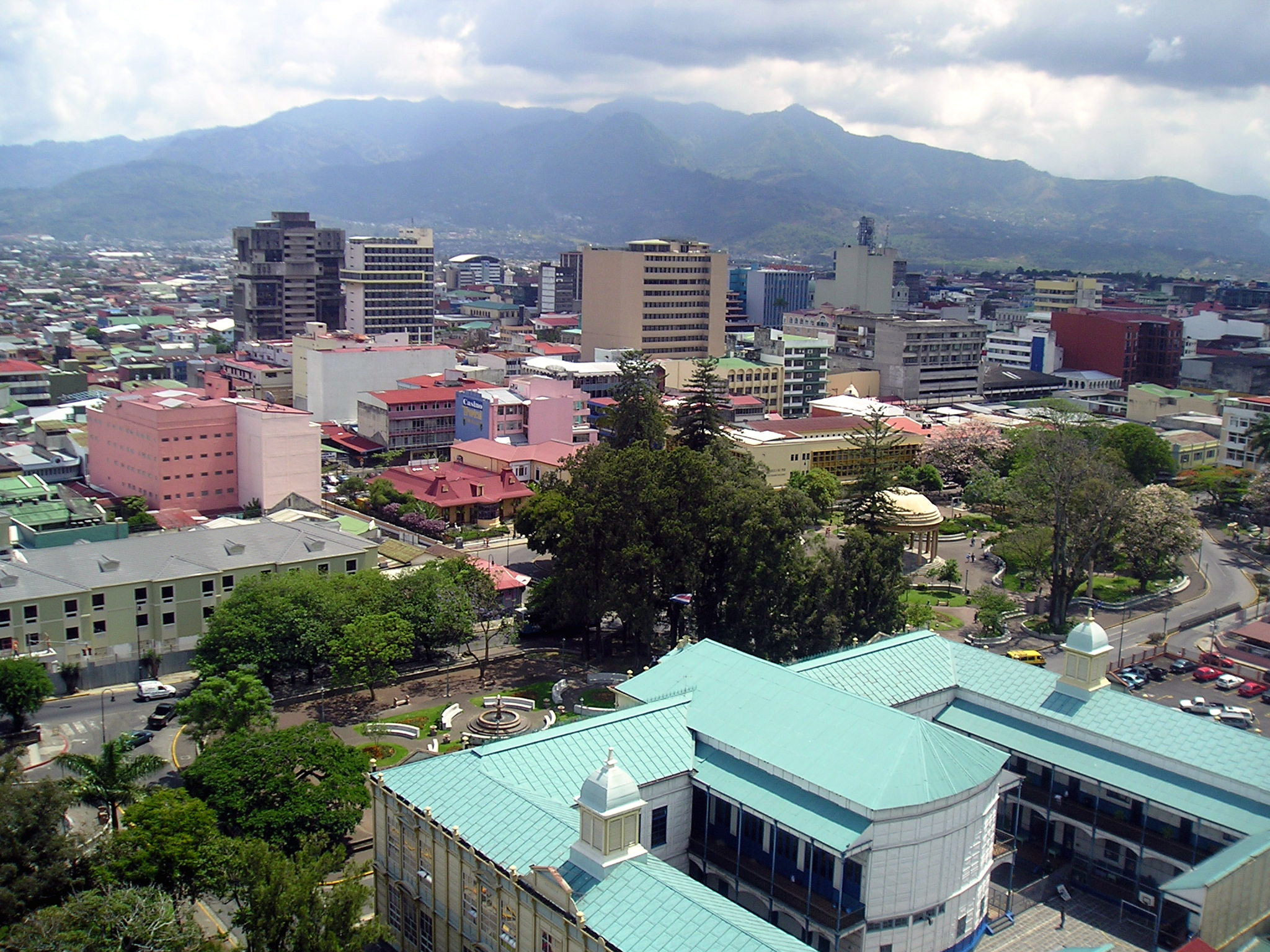
San José, Costa Rica's capital and largest canton by population

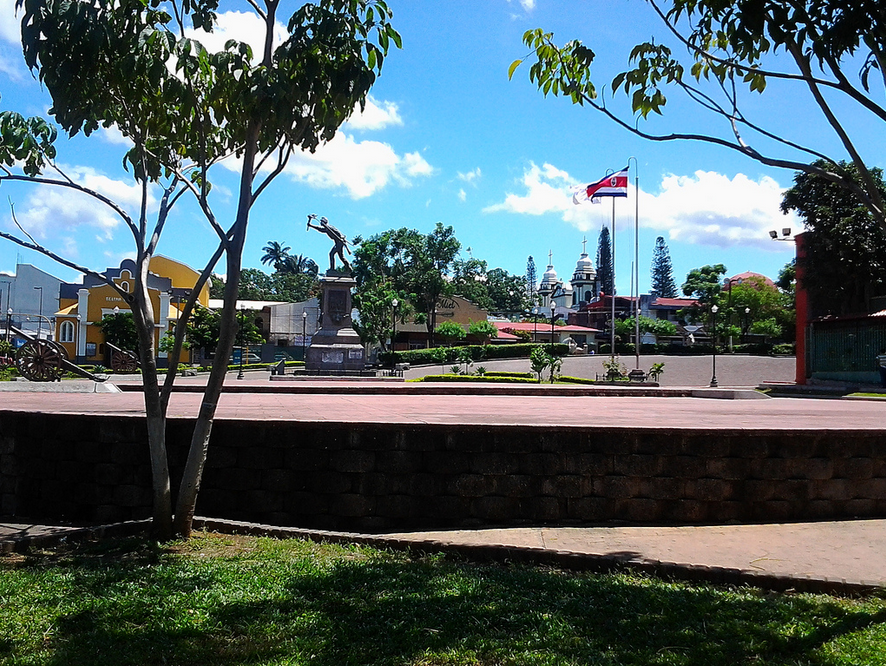
Alajuela, Costa Rica's second largest canton by population

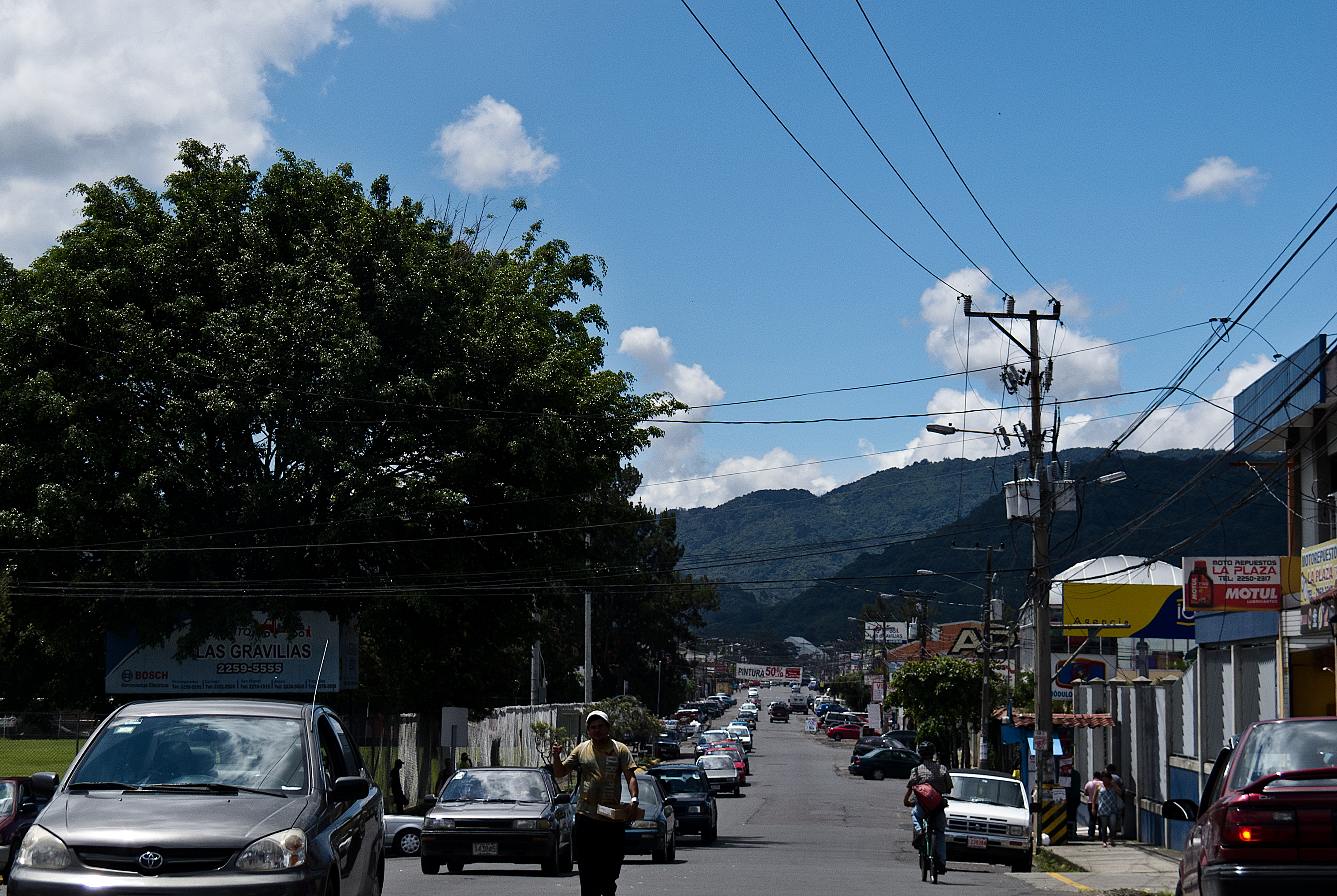
Desamparados, Costa Rica's third largest canton by population and suburb of San Jose

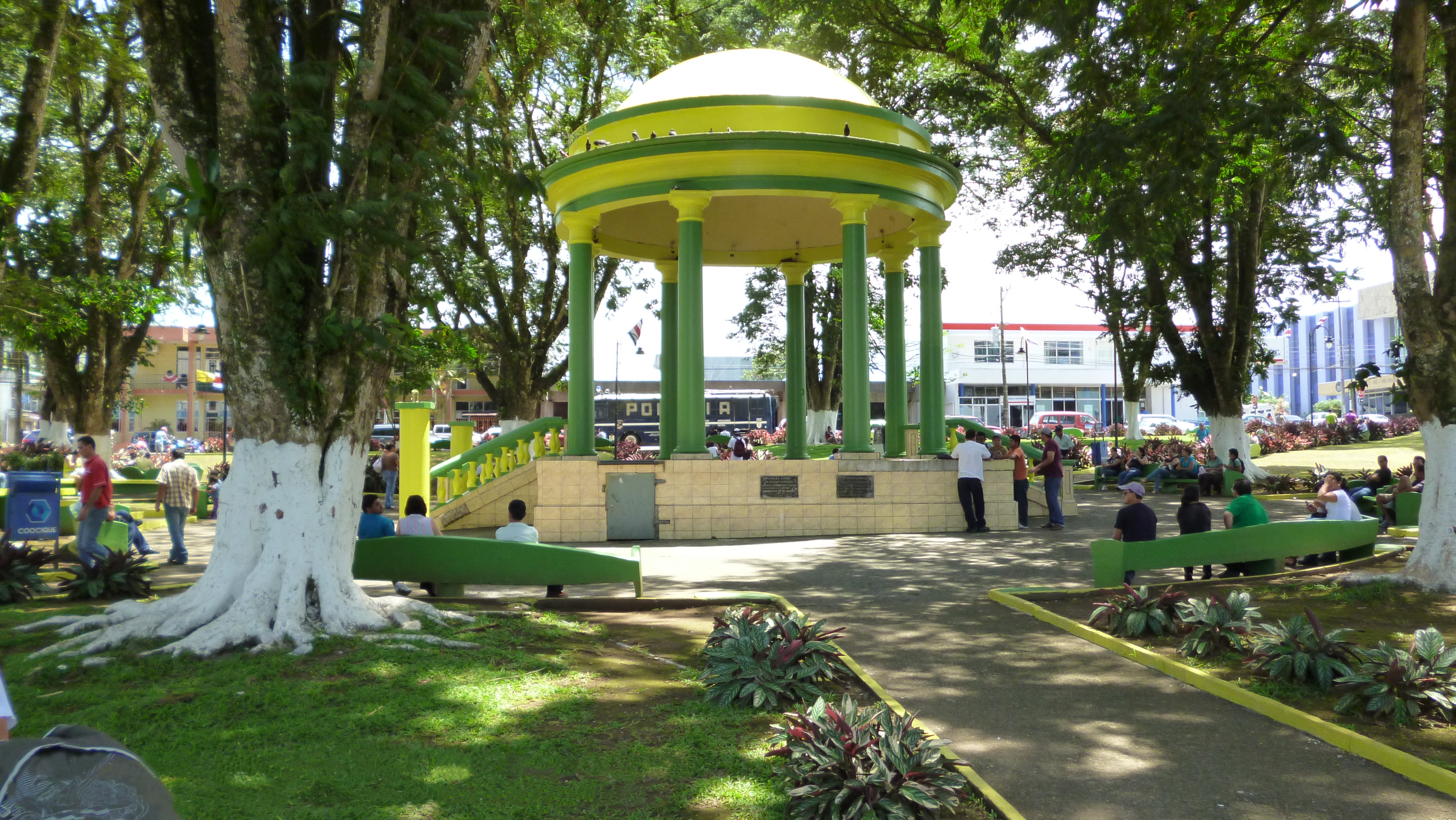
Pavilion of Ciudad Quesada, located in Costa Rica's fourth largest canton by population, San Carlos

Provincial Capital†

National Capital and Provincial Capital‡

Canton	City	Province	Population (2022)	Population (2011)	Change	Land area (km^{2})	Population density (2022)	Incorporation date
San José‡	San José	San José	352,381	288,054	+22.3%	44.62	7,897.4/km^{2}	1848
Escazú	Escazú	San José	71,500	56,509	+26.5%	34.53	2,070.7/km^{2}	1848
Desamparados	Desamparados	San José	223,226	208,411	+7.1%	118.89	1,877.6/km^{2}	1862
Puriscal	Santiago	San José	38,525	33,004	+16.7%	555.02	69.4/km^{2}	1868
Tarrazú	San Marcos	San José	17,810	16,280	+9.4%	291.27	61.1/km^{2}	1868
Aserrí	Aserrí	San José	59,588	57,892	+2.9%	168.26	354.1/km^{2}	1882
Mora	Colón	San José	32,348	26,294	+23.0%	163.47	197.9/km^{2}	1883
Goicoechea	Guadalupe	San José	132,104	115,084	+14.8%	31.7	4,167.3/km^{2}	1891
Santa Ana	Santa Ana	San José	58,020	49,123	+18.1%	61.42	944.6/km^{2}	1907
Alajuelita	Alajuelita	San José	81,012	77,603	+4.4%	21.47	3,773.3/km^{2}	1909
Vázquez de Coronado	San Isidro	San José	67,078	60,486	+10.9%	223.93	299.5/km^{2}	1910
Acosta	San Ignacio	San José	22,542	20,209	+11.5%	342.56	65.8/km^{2}	1910
Tibás	San Juan	San José	74,592	64,842	+15.0%	8.27	9,019.6/km^{2}	1914
Moravia	San Vicente	San José	59,546	56,919	+4.6%	28.82	2,066.1/km^{2}	1914
Montes de Oca	San Pedro	San José	53,862	49,132	+9.6%	15.78	3,413.3/km^{2}	1915
Turrubares	San Pablo	San José	6,173	5,512	+12.0%	416.25	14.8/km^{2}	1920
Dota	Santa María	San José	9,364	6,948	+34.8%	404.44	23.2/km^{2}	1925
Curridabat	Curridabat	San José	71,026	65,206	+8.9%	16.06	4,422.5/km^{2}	1929
Pérez Zeledón	San Isidro de El General	San José	156,917	134,534	+16.6%	1,901.08	82.5/km^{2}	1931
León Cortés Castro	San Pablo	San José	13,553	12,200	+11.1%	121.89	111.2/km^{2}	1961
Alajuela†	Alajuela	Alajuela	322,143	254,886	+26.4%	391.62	822.6/km^{2}	1848
San Ramón	San Ramón	Alajuela	93,264	80,566	+15.8%	1,021.74	91.3/km^{2}	1856
Grecia	Grecia	Alajuela	76,226	76,898	−0.9%	142.47	535.0/km^{2}	1848
San Mateo	San Mateo	Alajuela	6,952	6,136	+13.3%	125.03	55.6/km^{2}	1868
Atenas	Atenas	Alajuela	30,407	25,460	+19.4%	126.31	240.7/km^{2}	1868
Naranjo	Naranjo	Alajuela	46,647	42,713	+9.2%	127.01	367.3/km^{2}	1886
Palmares	Palmares	Alajuela	39,148	34,716	+12.8%	38.94	1,005.3/km^{2}	1888
Poás	San Pedro	Alajuela	36,207	29,199	+24.0%	74.48	486.1/km^{2}	1901
Orotina	Orotina	Alajuela	24,217	20,341	+19.1%	145.11	166.9/km^{2}	1908
San Carlos	Quesada	Alajuela	198,742	163,745	+21.4%	3,352.14	59.3/km^{2}	1911
Zarcero	Zarcero	Alajuela	15,153	12,205	+24.2%	157.36	96.3/km^{2}	1915
Sarchí	Sarchí Norte	Alajuela	21,562	18,085	+19.2%	136.76	157.7/km^{2}	1949
Upala	Upala	Alajuela	57,361	43,953	+30.5%	1,592.67	36.0/km^{2}	1970
Los Chiles	Los Chiles	Alajuela	34,701	23,735	+46.2%	1,332.71	26.0/km^{2}	1970
Guatuso	San Rafael	Alajuela	18,316	15,508	+18.1%	752.83	24.3/km^{2}	1970
Río Cuarto	Río Cuarto	Alajuela	14,418	11,074	+30.2%	254.89	56.6/km^{2}	2017
Cartago†	Cartago	Cartago	165,417	147,898	+11.8%	278.66	593.6/km^{2}	1848
Paraíso	Paraíso	Cartago	65,941	57,743	+14.2%	476.99	138.2/km^{2}	1848
La Unión	Tres Ríos	Cartago	99,539	99,399	+0.1%	44.18	2,253.0/km^{2}	1848
Jiménez	Juan Viñas	Cartago	18,710	14,669	+27.5%	250.07	74.8/km^{2}	1903
Turrialba	Turrialba	Cartago	82,065	69,616	+17.9%	1,589.25	51.6/km^{2}	1903
Alvarado	Pacayas	Cartago	17,134	14,312	+19.7%	79.18	216.4/km^{2}	1908
Oreamuno	San Rafael	Cartago	48,911	45,473	+7.6%	202.9	241.1/km^{2}	1914
El Guarco	El Tejar	Cartago	47,375	41,793	+13.4%	172	275.4/km^{2}	1939
Heredia†	Heredia	Heredia	131,901	123,616	+6.7%	283.11	465.9/km^{2}	1848
Barva	Barva	Heredia	47,699	40,660	+17.3%	56.01	851.6/km^{2}	1848
Santo Domingo	Santo Domingo	Heredia	45,932	40,072	+14.6%	25.4	1,808.3/km^{2}	1869
Santa Bárbara	Santa Bárbara	Heredia	39,133	36,243	+8.0%	52.1	751.1/km^{2}	1882
San Rafael	San Rafael	Heredia	48,848	45,965	+6.3%	48.31	1,011.1/km^{2}	1885
San Isidro	San Isidro	Heredia	22,806	20,633	+10.5%	26.67	855.1/km^{2}	1905
Belén	San Antonio	Heredia	23,759	21,633	+9.8%	12.38	1,919.1/km^{2}	1907
Flores	San Joaquín	Heredia	22,026	20,037	+9.9%	6.75	3,263.1/km^{2}	1915
San Pablo	San Pablo	Heredia	29,860	27,671	+7.9%	8.34	3,580.3/km^{2}	1961
Sarapiquí	Puerto Viejo	Heredia	67,153	57,147	+17.5%	2,144.38	31.3/km^{2}	1970
Liberia†	Liberia	Guanacaste	80,130	62,987	+27.2%	1,442.17	55.6/km^{2}	1848
Nicoya	Nicoya	Guanacaste	66,268	50,825	+30.4%	1,337.57	49.5/km^{2}	1848
Santa Cruz	Santa Cruz	Guanacaste	72,366	55,104	+31.3%	1,320.81	54.8/km^{2}	1848
Bagaces	Bagaces	Guanacaste	23,709	19,536	+21.4%	1,277.93	18.6/km^{2}	1848
Carrillo	Filadelfia	Guanacaste	48,227	37,122	+29.9%	599.01	80.5/km^{2}	1877
Cañas	Cañas	Guanacaste	31,738	26,201	+21.1%	687.05	46.2/km^{2}	1878
Abangares	Las Juntas	Guanacaste	22,211	18,039	+23.1%	646.02	34.4/km^{2}	1915
Tilarán	Tilarán	Guanacaste	21,232	19,640	+8.1%	669.23	31.7/km^{2}	1923
Nandayure	Carmona	Guanacaste	11,874	11,121	+6.8%	568.14	20.9/km^{2}	1961
La Cruz	La Cruz	Guanacaste	26,829	19,181	+39.9%	1,385.38	19.4/km^{2}	1969
Hojancha	Hojancha	Guanacaste	8,224	7,197	+14.3%	262.99	31.3/km^{2}	1971
Puntarenas†	Puntarenas	Puntarenas	141,697	115,019	+23.2%	1,786.9	79.3/km^{2}	1862
Esparza	Esparza (Espíritu Santo district)	Puntarenas	34,808	28,644	+21.5%	217.23	160.2/km^{2}	1848
Buenos Aires	Buenos Aires	Puntarenas	50,562	45,244	+11.8%	2,382.94	21.2/km^{2}	1914
Montes de Oro	Miramar	Puntarenas	16,395	12,950	+26.6%	247.59	66.2/km^{2}	1915
Osa	Puerto Cortés	Puntarenas	36,088	29,433	+22.6%	1,932.7	18.7/km^{2}	1940
Quepos	Quepos	Puntarenas	32,416	26,861	+20.7%	557.85	58.1/km^{2}	1948
Golfito	Golfito	Puntarenas	44,086	39,150	+12.6%	1,032.32	42.7/km^{2}	1949
Coto Brus	San Vito	Puntarenas	46,351	38,453	+20.5%	944.24	49.1/km^{2}	1965
Parrita	Parrita	Puntarenas	20,068	16,115	+24.5%	483.22	41.5/km^{2}	1971
Corredores	Ciudad Neily (Corredor district)	Puntarenas	51,023	41,831	+22.0%	623.61	81.8/km^{2}	1973
Garabito	Jacó	Puntarenas	26,672	17,229	+54.8%	316.01	84.4/km^{2}	1980
Monteverde	Monteverde	Puntarenas	5,386	4,155	+29.6%	53.47	100.7/km^{2}	2021
Puerto Jiménez	Puerto Jiménez	Puntarenas	10,644	8,789	+21.1%	720.43	14.8/km^{2}	2022
Limón†	Limón	Limón	116,457	94,415	+23.3%	1,769.38	65.8/km^{2}	1909
Pococí	Guápiles	Limón	146,320	125,962	+16.2%	2,188.25	66.9/km^{2}	1911
Siquirres	Siquirres	Limón	63,765	56,786	+12.3%	855.15	74.6/km^{2}	1969
Talamanca	Bribrí	Limón	48,906	30,712	+59.2%	2,792.23	17.5/km^{2}	1911
Matina	Matina	Limón	45,329	37,721	+20.2%	770.4	58.8/km^{2}	1969
Guácimo	Guácimo	Limón	49,606	41,266	+20.2%	801.56	61.9/km^{2}	1971
Costa Rica			5,044,197	4,301,712	+17.3%	51,170.45 (Note: Not including Cocos Island's land area.)	98.6/km^{2}	

== See also ==
- Provinces of Costa Rica
- Districts of Costa Rica
