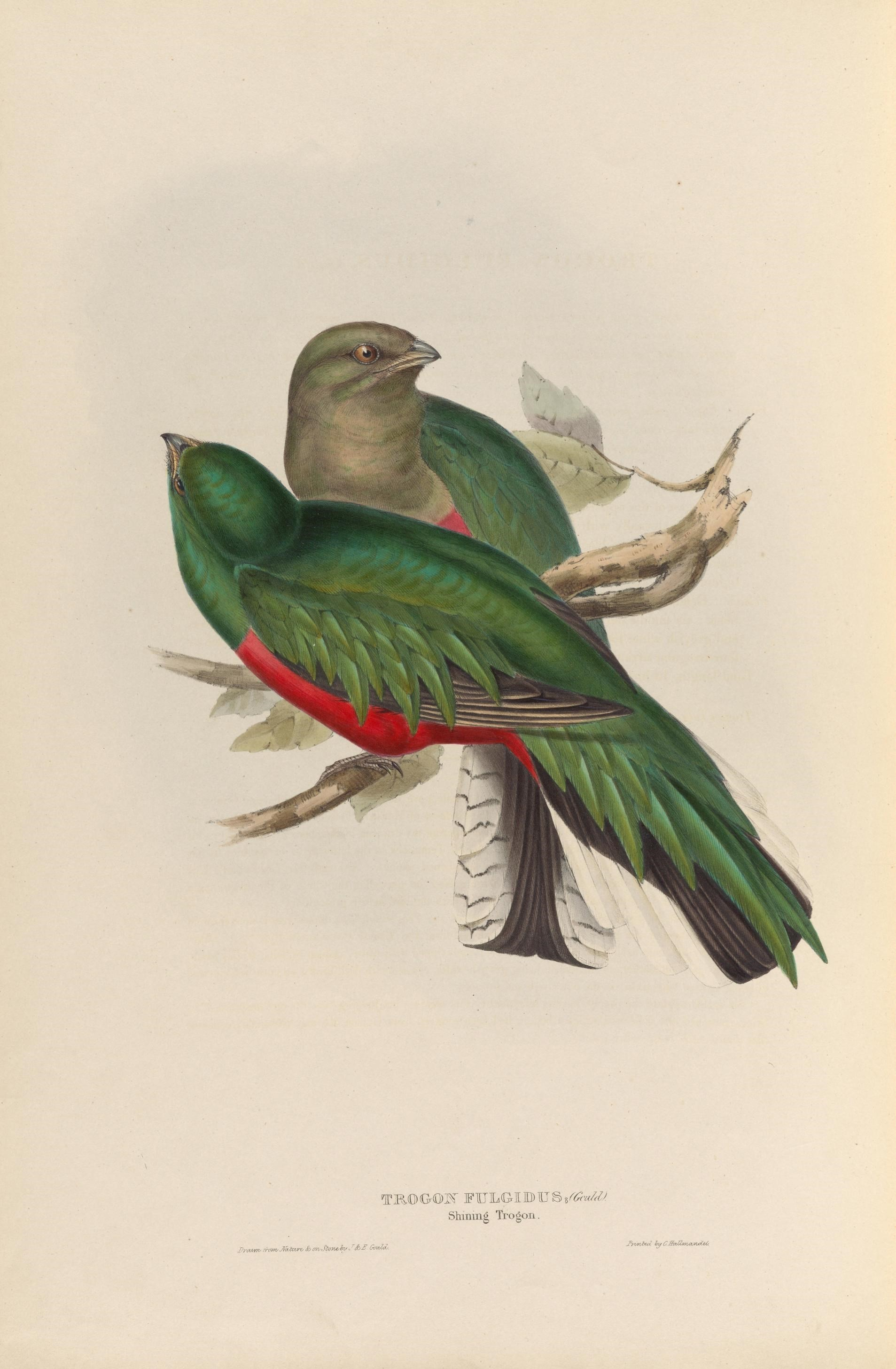

Conservation status
- Least Concern (IUCN 3.1)

Scientific classification
- Kingdom: Animalia
- Phylum: Chordata
- Class: Aves
- Order: Trogoniformes
- Family: Trogonidae
- Genus: Pharomachrus
- Species: P. fulgidus

Binomial name
- Pharomachrus fulgidus (Gould, 1838)

= White-tipped quetzal =

Species of bird

The white-tipped quetzal (Pharomachrus fulgidus) is a species of bird in the family Trogonidae found in Venezuela, Colombia, and Guyana. Two subspecies have been described. Pharomachrus fulgidus fulgidus is found in the mountains of northern Venezuela and Pharomachrus fulgidus festatus ranges through the Santa Marta mountains of northeast Colombia. Quetzals are iridescent and colourful birds found in forests, woodlands and humid highlands. The white-tipped quetzal has been a limited subject of research. Pharomachrus nests have been studied to analyse the effects of rainfall on breeding, however conclusions are based on single observations. On the IUCN Red list of threatened species, the white-tipped quetzal is listed as a species of least concern.

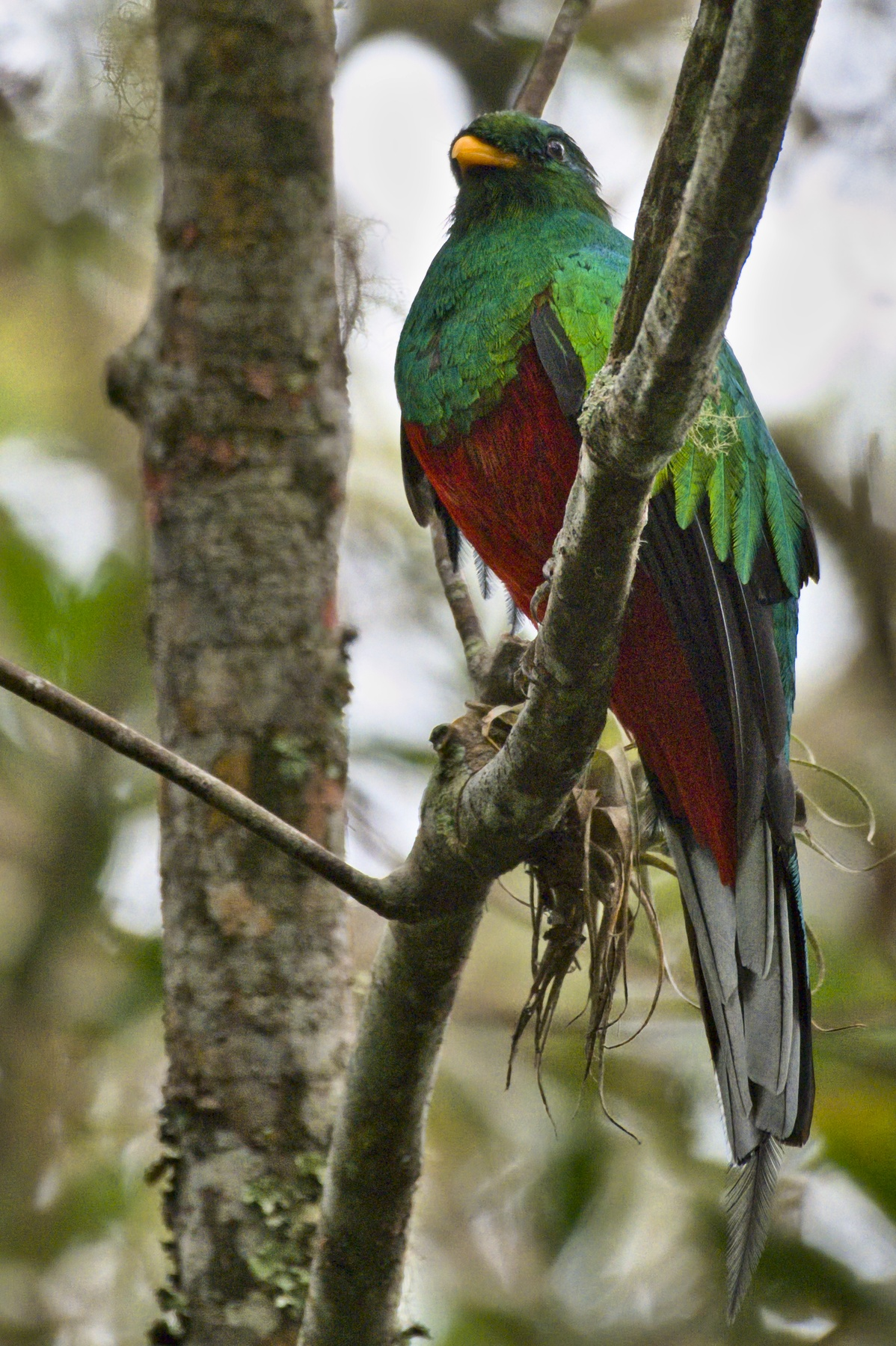
White-tipped Quetzal

== Identification ==
=== Morphology ===
The adult male white-tipped quetzal is identified by a golden, green-bronze crown and nape with bright green breast, back, rump and upper tail-coverts. The male bill is butter yellow and feet are brownish-black. The under tail-coverts and belly are a striking red, wings and upper tail are black with the under tail appearing white, thus the 'white-tipped' descriptive name. These broad, white backed outer rectrices occupy about a third of their length. The male has elongated feathers on the forehead, creating a short crest. The white tips of outermost rectrix are 50 mm long, next 55mm, and next 32 mm long. Adult females are less iridescent, with no frontal crest and the throat, belly and breast appearing brown-grey bordered by a green band. The female bill and feet are yellowish-brown to grey and their three outermost rectrices are also narrowly tipped with white. In immature birds, both male and female chicks have remiges, scapulars and wing coverts intermixed with buff, outer rectrices infused with white and feathers more narrow and pointed than adults. Immature females have a brown breast. Trogons are the only birds with a heterodactyl toe arrangement.

=== Vocalisations ===
Hilty and colleagues (1986) describe the voice as a loud kirra, or kirra, kip, and when excited kier, kip-kip-kip-a.

== Habitat ==
The white-tipped quetzal can be found in Colombia, Venezuela and Guyana and the species is endemic to the northern South America. In Colombia and Venezuela they appear in upper tropical and subtropical zones. The white-tipped quetzal occurs in a wide variety of habitats from subtropical to temperate forests, cloud forests, secondary growth, forest edges, moist ravines and coffee plantations. Like the golden-headed and crested quetzals, they are cloud forest birds. They are rarer in Guyana, however they have been seen inhabiting the most dense areas in the barrancas (deep ravines) of forests. Due to the lack of observations on the white-tipped quetzal, it is unknown why they favour these environments, however it is likely due to the temperate, humid conditions, the availability of berries and the ability to find small crevices in these areas to nest in.

== Ecology ==
Breeding predominantly occurs towards the end of the dry season, between January and April. It is thought that the quetzal's reproductive cycle is directly correlated with fruit availability. Reproductive activities including courtship, nesting and chick rearing occur when fruits are most abundant in the forest conditions. This aids the species during energy-demanding phases of their life which may increase the probability of successful reproduction. White-tipped quetzal nests are usually located in isolated, non-native trees, sometimes in previous holes of woodpeckers and often in dead tree trunks 4–10m above the ground. Nests have been observed in an old cavity, excavated by a Woodpecker, in a dead snag, approximately 5 m above the ground at an elevation of 1600 m. They can also nest in termite nests, laying 2–4 white or pastel-coloured eggs and there were subtle differences in egg color and size. First breeding is usually at one to two years of age. The altricial young hatch naked, quickly molting into their immature plumage without a significant downy stage. This fast, naked-to-feathered progression may be an ancestral characteristic or a result of nesting in cavities where the temperature is constant and down is not needed for temperature regulation. The species fledges in around three weeks and obtains adult plumage after their second prebasic molt. There is little data on the survival rates and competition of the white-tipped quetzal however its IUCN status suggests that the population is stable.

== Diet ==
The white-tipped quetzal feeds on fruits and berries and has been observed collecting these by means of sallying from a perch. One individual has also been seen eating a large lizard on at least one occasion. Their wide bills and weak legs reflect their diet within arboreal areas.

== Behaviour ==
The specific behavioural habits of the white-tipped quetzal have not been studied in detail. However, it is presumed that they partake in the general behavioural patterns of the trogon family. The white-tipped quetzal is a fast flyer, but reluctant to fly long distances. Trogons are generally non-migratory. Some species undertake partial local movements, however it is presumed that the white-tipped quetzal is a sedentary species. Trogons are usually inactive outside of intermittent feeding flights. They find food by the most commonly used technique for Trogons, which is a sally-glean flight where a trogon flies from a perch to its target on a branch or within foliage. Once it has arrived at its target the bird hovers and then grabs the item before returning to its original perch to consume the seed or berry. It has been noted that although the White-tipped quetzal is striking and beautiful, it has few to no further engaging qualities. This lack of activity is presumably a defence against predation, likely to compensate for their famous bright feathers. Trogons have been observed moving from branch to branch, keeping their brightly coloured feathers sheltered from potential observers while also keeping watch using their flexible necks, which can turn through 180 degrees. These anti-predatory techniques provide an effective camouflage within their natural wooded habitats.

== Threats ==
Predators of the White-tipped quetzal have not been recorded, however Trogons have reportedly been preyed upon by predatory mammals and hawks. One report of a Resplendent quetzal taken, while caring for chicks, by a margay.

Pharomachrus quetzals are also at risk of parasites, similar to those who live on songbirds or pigeons in the same general area. Ornithoctona nitens, native to neotropical America, appears to be a parasite specific to the family Trogonidae. The white-tipped quetzal nests in old tree cavities, potentially limiting the population. The availability of nesting sites can often limit the reproductive and survival rates of birds within such populations. Habitat loss has also been found to be an increased threat for species in the Americas and the Cordillera de Caripe and Paria, where White-tipped quetzals abide, is currently threatened by the destruction of natural habitats. The destruction of forested areas in the Neotropics largely threatens wood-cavity nesting birds as the use of their nesting sites directly relies on the presence of trees. Even sustainable forestry practices, for example the removal of dead trees, will increase the risk of population declines in wood-cavity nesting birds.

== Population and Conservation ==
=== Population size and distribution ===
The white-tipped quetzal is endemic to the Americas. The species occurs at altitudes of 900–1900 m in Venezuela, in the coastal cordillera from Yaracuy to Miranda, to the middle cordillera on Cerro Golfo Triste and spreading to the eastern cordillera in Anzoátegui, the northern Monagas, and Sucre east to Cerro Humo. The species is also found at altitudes of 1500–2500 m, distributed through Colombia's Santa Marta mountains in the Sierra Nevada. However, a white-tipped quetzal was reported at an elevation of 725–775 m in a cafetel in Cucuchica, Venezuela, which suggests that the species has a greater range of distribution than has been observed. The white-tipped quetzal is also native to Guyana, however its status there is unclear and the distribution of its population there has not been documented. This is likely due to the species inhabiting the most dense and savage areas and barrancas of the tropical forests. Though it has the smallest distribution of any quetzal, it is fairly common within the ranges where it is found. Due to the lack of studies on the white-tipped quetzal, specific population numbers have not been predicted.

=== Status and Conservation ===
Although the white-tipped quetzal may have a restricted range, it is not predicted to approach the boundary for Vulnerable under the range size criteria, the population trend criteria or the population size criteria. This is because the species population is not declining or fluctuating, their habitat quality is stable and their population structure is firm and not subject to fragmentation. For these reasons the white-tipped quetzal is listed as a species of Least Concern on the IUCN Red list of threatened species. This means that no conservation strategies for the white-tipped quetzal or its habitats are planned or taking place. However it is noted that more research must be done on the species and its population statistics.
