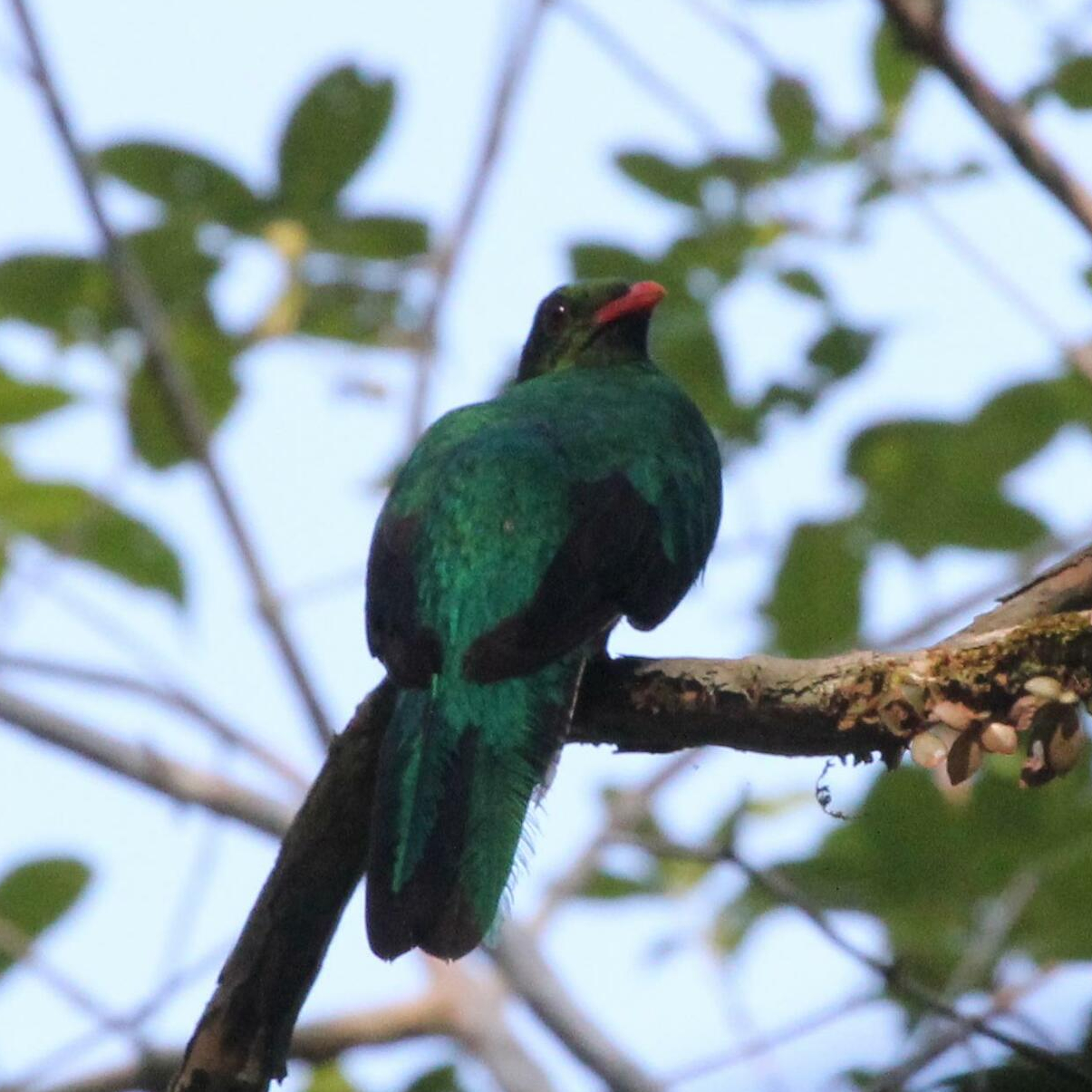

Conservation status
- Least Concern (IUCN 3.1)

Scientific classification
- Kingdom: Animalia
- Phylum: Chordata
- Class: Aves
- Order: Trogoniformes
- Family: Trogonidae
- Genus: Pharomachrus
- Species: P. pavoninus

Binomial name
- Pharomachrus pavoninus (Spix, 1824)

= Pavonine quetzal =

Species of bird

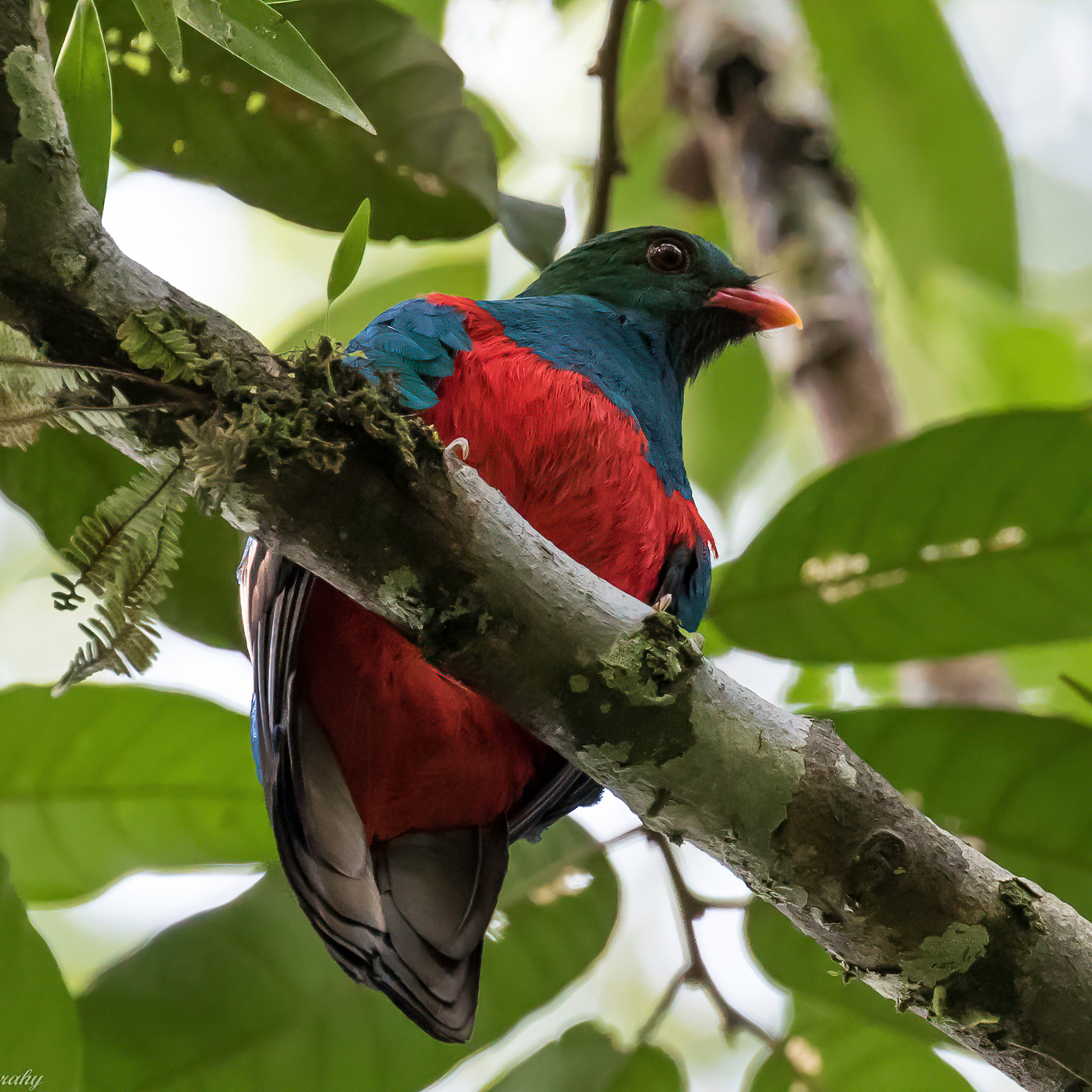
Pavonine quetzal displaying its red belly

The pavonine quetzal (Pharomachrus pavoninus) is a species of bird in the family Trogonidae, the trogons. It is also known at the peacock trogon, red-billed train bearer, or viuda pico rojo in Spanish. The pavonine quetzal lives in the Neotropics, more specifically in the northern region of the Amazon basin, spreading from Colombia to Bolivia. The most notable characteristics helpful in identifying this bird are its plumage, red beak (male; females have grey bills), and its distribution - it is the only quetzal occupying the lowland rainforest east of the Andes.

== Taxonomy ==
The pavonine quetzal belongs to the Trogon family (Trogonidae) that falls in Trogoniformes, which differ from other birds primarily by the unique toe arrangement. As opposed to woodpeckers (family Picidae) who have the first and fourth toe facing backwards, trogons have the first and second toe positioned posteriorly, while the third and fourth remain anterior to the foot. Their toe arrangement makes them poorly suited for walking or hopping, and so trogons are most commonly seen flying or perched below canopy level. Some species, like the endangered resplendent quetzal have evolved some elaborate ornamental feathers, exemplifying how most of the species in this family have feathers more suited to display, rather than flight ability. Trogons generally fly for short periods of time, and use quick, undulating wingbeats to move them from one perch to the next. Among other things, their inefficient flying limits them to migrate short distances, if at all. However, trogons as a family are distributed across the globe, pantropically, from roughly 35°N to 35°S, and spanning all the way from sea level up to 3500m in elevation. Across this elevational gradient, different species occupy the various habitats, though all species are primarily frugivores, insectivores, or a combination of the two.

Within the trogon family, there are two subfamilies: Apaloderminae, or African trogons (example genus: Apaloderma); and Trogoninae, or non-African trogons. In the non-African trogons, the two front toes are always at least partially fused, which serves them like spades in excavation of nesting sites. P. pavoninus falls within the tribe Trogonini, which only includes the new world trogons and the quetzals. A few other defining characteristics of this tribe include physical descriptors such as uniform and iridescent green to blue head, throat, upper breast and upper parts; and contrasting red to yellow underparts; as well as a colourful, bare eye ring; a serrated or notched margin of the lower bill's tip; and in females and juveniles, the presence of noticeable black and white patterns on the three outer pairs of tail feathers (rectrices).

While different molecular markers lead to debate about the basal relationship of trogons, the most common resulting phylogenies indicate that the African trogons are basal to the Indomalayan and Neotropical trogons, and the latter two are likely sister taxa. Additionally, the Trogonini appear almost certainly to be monophyletic. In other studies, the phylogeny produces similar relationships, placing the African trogons basally, followed by the Indomalayan trogons, then the quetzals, and finally the new world trogons.

Quetzals, genus Pharomachrus, distinguish themselves from other new world trogons by two main morphological traits. First, the absence of serrations on maxilla, having a simple notch near the tip of the bill instead, in addition to an undulating margin of the mandible. Second, their nostrils rest closer together, and partially hide beneath an overhanging operculum. Quetzals weigh in relatively heavy around 150 to 250g, and they feed primarily on fruit. Male quetzals also have four noticeably elongated and iridescent feathers (specifically, two pairs of middle upper-tail coverts) that often meet or reach slightly beyond the tail.

== Description ==
Like many other quetzals, pavonine quetzals are fairly brilliantly coloured, exhibiting some sexual dichromatism, with the females being noticeable duller than the males. Overall, they resemble most closely the golden-headed quetzal (Pharomachrus auriceps).

=== Male description ===
Feathers of the back, breast, median wing coverts, rump and upper tail coverts are all iridescent green with a black base and some that are edged with bronze. The feathers on the head give a golden brown to golden green appearance, while the belly stands out as a brilliant red. The remaining feathers on the wings (remiges: primaries, secondaries; greater wing coverts), rectrices, and thighs are all black. The bill recalls the red of the belly, and yellows to the tip. Finally, the iris is reddish to brownish, while the legs and toes are yellowish to brownish.

In this species, the nape feathers rather than the forehead feathers form a bristly crest. Additionally, the lore feathers are of normal length (i.e. not elongated). At the wing, the upper wing coverts grow moderately long and pointed, reaching over the primaries. At the tail, the longest of the upper tail coverts grow long and pointed, extending to or slightly beyond the rectrices, covering them almost entirely. The rectrices, on the other hand, grow rounded at the tips and taper in length along the three outer pairs, while the six inner pairs grow to a more blunt or truncated end.

=== Female description ===
Similar to male, with most significant differences in the brilliance of the plumage, more buff colouring, and patterned tails. The head becomes brown or greyish, and the bill is much more grey bill with a black tip (LEBBIN). The tips of the wing feathers turn much more buff, and the abdomen develops into more of a brownish red. The rectrices have an alternating bar pattern of black and white, and the upper tail coverts are shorter than in males.

== Distribution and habitat ==
=== Distribution ===
The pavonine quetzal resides year-round in the Amazon basin. Its range crosses the borders of Brazil and Venezuela, southeastern Colombia, eastern Ecuador and Peru, and northern Bolivia. More specifically, it is found in the states of Amazonas and Bolívar in Venezuela, Amazonas and Roraima in Brazil, Beni and Pando in Bolivia, to name a few. In terms of geographical features, the pavonine quetzal seems to avoid the Tapajós River in the southeast, the Orinoco River in the north and the Andes in the West. Overall, the bulk of their distribution resides within 10°N and 15°S.

=== Habitat ===
The pavonine quetzal is the only quetzal found in the lowland rain forests of South America east of the Andes. Specifically, its preferred habitat seems to be the terra firme forests found in the Amazon basin and surrounding areas. Within the forest, it appears relatively restricted to the lower and middle understory of the forest ranging anywhere between 250m and 1200m elevation. Other sources place this quetzal at lower elevations, ranging from sea level to 700m. Regardless, they remain highly arboreal, only occasionally coming down to the forest floor.

In comparison, they fill a similar ecological role as golden-headed quetzals, who occupy the montane forests to the north and west.

== Behaviour ==
The pavonine quetzal remains a poorly studied species, meaning that much is unknown about the species in terms of behaviour. A few studies include this quetzal in bird inventories, but rarely go more in depth about the ecology and behaviour of the bird.

=== Diet ===
Like most quetzals, P. pavoninus is primarily a frugivore. A study looking at the stomach contents of nine specimens of this bird found that eight birds had solely eaten various fruits, whereas the other one had consumed a mixture of fruits and arthropods. Other researchers observed similar behaviour, classifying them as frugivores. In 2007, a short report documented the feeding behaviour of a couple and their newborn. About half the juvenile's diet consisted of tree frogs shortly after hatching, while the other half was reserved for variously shaped, sized and coloured fruit. Specifically, the tree frogs seemed to belong to two genera only: Hyla and Phyllomedusa, while the fruits came mostly from Lauraceae (near half), followed by Euterpe precatoria (Arecaceae), Iryanthera sp. (Myristicaceae), Pouteria sp. (Sapotaceae), Guatteria and Unonopsis sp. (Annonaceae), and Tetragastris sp. (Burseraceae) in decreasing order of importance. Over the few weeks it took to fledge the youngling, the parents increased the proportion of fruit in the neonate's diet.

=== Vocalisations ===
Quetzal vocalizations quite simple in form, loud, and repetitive. While a few variations exist on how to spell out the call of pavonine quetzals, their vocalizations resembles a descending whistle (« ew ewwo ewwo ewwo ewwo »), followed by a « chok » note. The birds will repeat this call around four times in ten seconds, and composes the bulk of their known vocalizations. They also produce an alarm call described as a chattering « wa op-op-op-op », much like that of a woodpecker. Finally, juveniles are only able to produce a short « ow » call.

These calls arguably do not vary from one sex to the other, and are especially during mating season. For example, males seem to repeatedly call to advertise their location after finding a suitable nesting site.

=== Reproduction and life history ===
There is a sufficient gap in knowledge about the breeding behaviour of pavonine quetzals (and many other trogons), especially concerning visual and vocal displays. As a general trend, however, it seems that breeding involves courtship chasing, some combination of perched and aerial visual displays, some reciprocated vocal displays. These birds also appear to be monogamous, and work together to excavate the nest. They choose nesting sites in rotting trees, old woodpecker holes, termataria, or vespiaries, and provide little to no lining. Reported suspected nests range from 4 - 9m above ground level. The only confirmed reporting of pavonine quetzal nesting describes the nest as a hollow, mostly bare cavity deep enough to hide both adults, with circular to wedge shaped entrance. The report also accounts the clutch contained two eggs, which is typical of this group. The eggs were pale blue, with a few light brown speckles. The eggs weighed between 8.5g and 13.5g, and measured 27.6 - 28.1mm by 31.5 - 32.4mm.

As for distribution of the roles, both sexes participated in incubation. The males seem to incubate during the day, from around 10AM until sunset (near 6PM), while the females incubate overnight and in the early morning. Incubation lasts at least 14–17 days. Once the eggs have hatched, adult occupation of the nest decreases rapidly, where mostly the male makes food deliveries for the young, though both parents attend the young. The nestlings are altricial, and depend heavily on the parents for food, even after they have fledged. Nestling lasts around 21 days, and fledging continue to be dependant for up to two months. Until then, the parents feed them on the ground or low branches. During this period, chicks are most vulnerable to predators, such as raptors, snakes and squirrels.

Their plumage takes a few weeks to fully grow out, starting out as a mixture of down-like feathers, pin feathers, and short tawny feathers, and eventually growing out their full juvenile plumage. Initially, they look fairly different than their adult counterparts, with noticeable colour differences in feathers and other tissues. For males, we suspect that young males take up to three years to grow their full length plumage.
