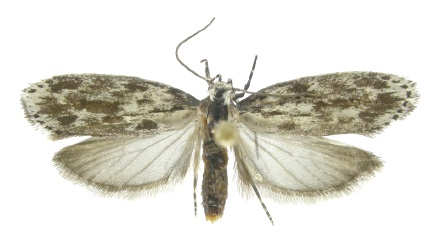

Scientific classification
- Domain: Eukaryota
- Kingdom: Animalia
- Phylum: Arthropoda
- Class: Insecta
- Order: Lepidoptera
- Family: Depressariidae
- Genus: Ethmia
- Species: E. berndkerni

Binomial name
- Ethmia berndkerni Phillips, 2014

= Ethmia berndkerni =

Species of moth

Ethmia berndkerni is a moth in the family Depressariidae. It is found in Costa Rica, where it has been recorded from the foothills of the Cordillera de Guanacaste (at altitudes between 150 and 800 meters or 490 and 2,620 feet), the northern Caribbean lowlands (at about 200 meters, 660 ft), in the Cordillera Volcánica Central (at altitudes between 1,000 and 1,500 meters or 3,300 and 4,900 feet) and at the Península de Osa (at about 200 meters, 660 ft). The habitat consists of rain forests.

The length of the forewings is 7.5–9.8 mm (0.30–0.39 in) for males and 8.8–10.8 mm (0.35–0.43 in) for females. The ground color of the forewings is light brown with indistinct dark brown/black elongated markings and a defined big spot at the costa before the apex. The posterior half of the base has no markings. The terminal line is composed of eight blackish dots from before the costa to the tornus. The hindwing ground colour is light brown, becoming darker at the apex.

The larvae feed on Bourreria costaricensis.

== Etymology ==
The species is named in honor of Bernd Kern for his support of Eternal Children's Rainforest of Monteverde, Costa Rica; Children's Rainforest Sweden; and Área de Conservación Guanacaste.
