= Children's Eternal Rainforest =

Protected area in Costa Rica

- El Bosque Eterno de los Niños
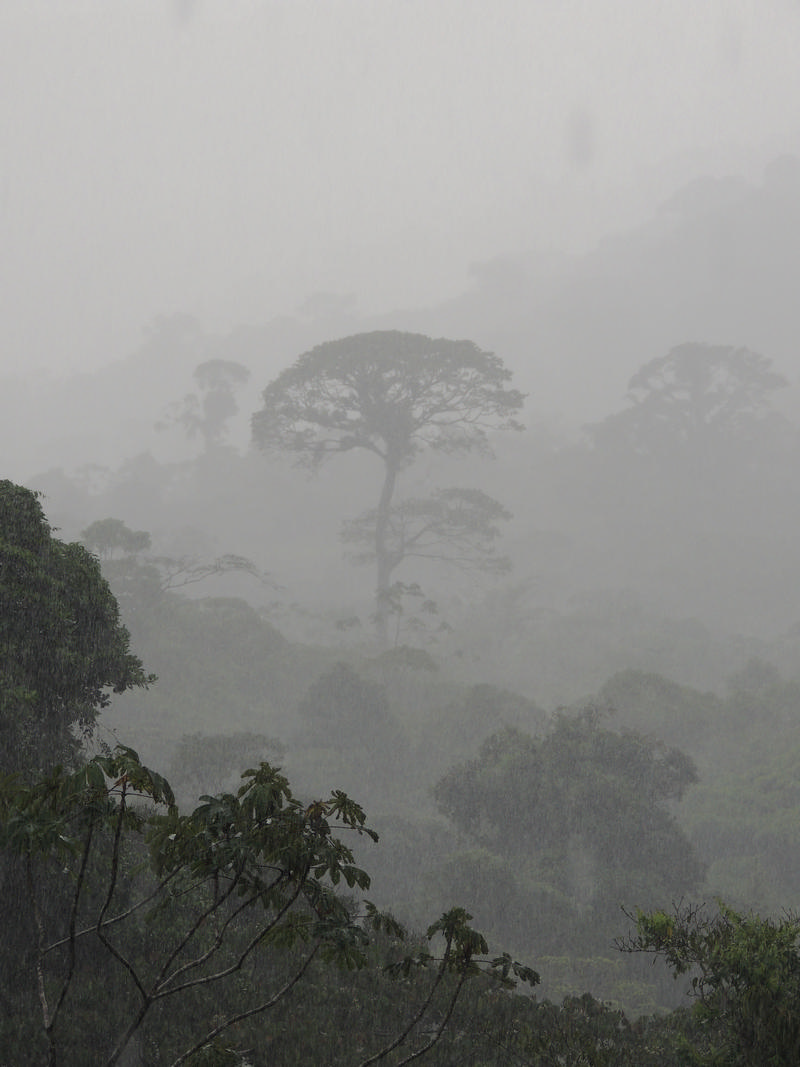
- Children's Eternal Rainforest

- Location within Costa Rica
- Location: Puntarenas and Alajuela, Costa Rica
- Coordinates: 10°20′23″N 84°42′0″W
- Area: 22,600 ha (87 sq mi)
- Established: 1987
- Operator: Monteverde Conservation League

The Children's Eternal Rainforest (Spanish: Bosque Eterno de los Niños) is a private land trust and preserve in Costa Rica. The 23,000-hectare (57,000-acre) preserve is run by the non-profit Monteverde Conservation League.

== History ==
The Monteverde Conservation League was formed in 1986 to counteract agricultural development threatening Pacific Slope forests near the Monteverde Cloud Forest Reserve. After U.S. biologist Sharon Kinsman gave a presentation about the rainforests to a class of Swedish schoolteacher Eha Kern, the children raised funds to protect the forest. Their efforts initially raised $18,000 for the forest. Kern and her husband formed the Swedish non-profit Barnens Regnskog (Children's Rainforest) in 1987.

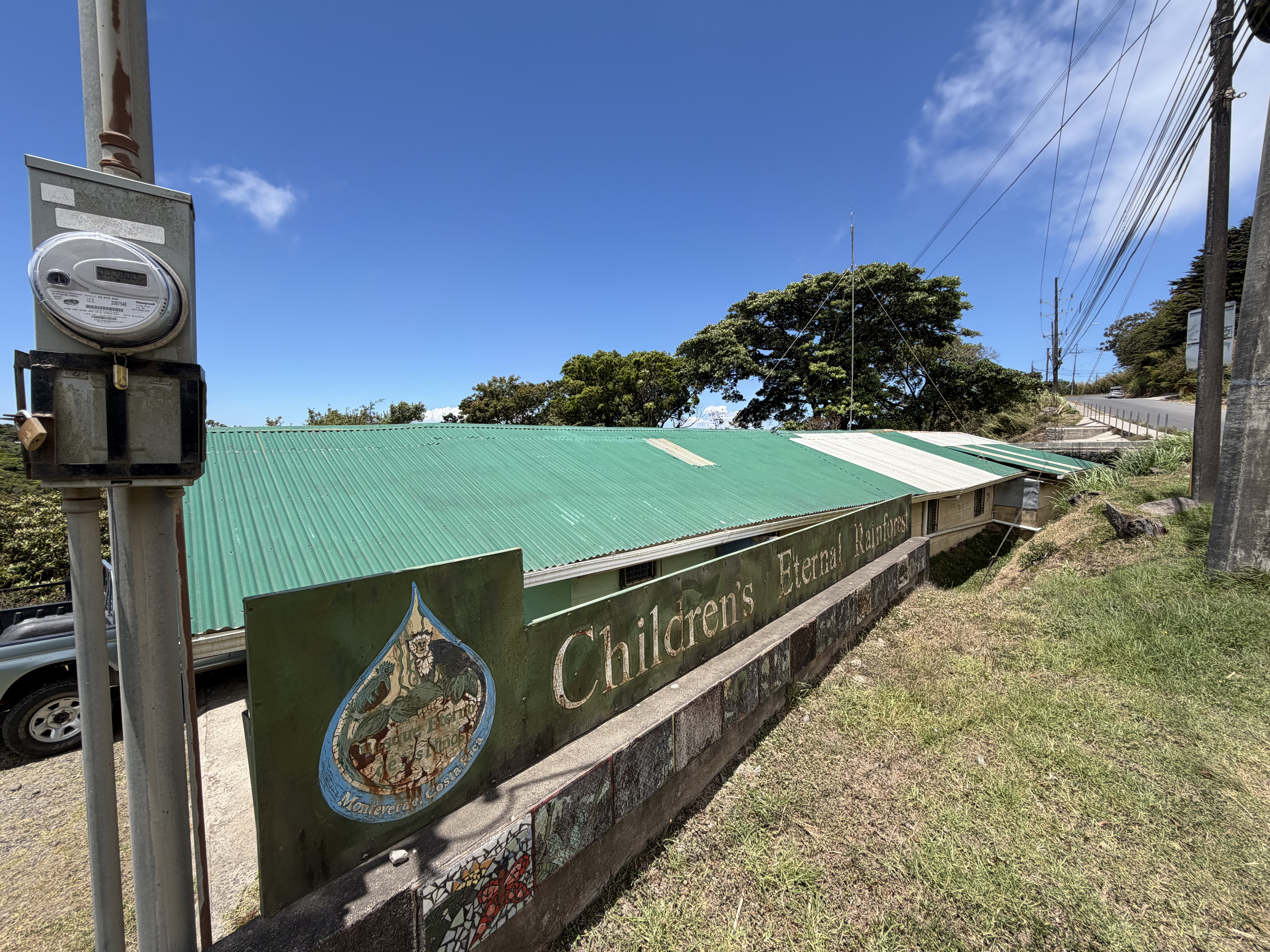
This building is as of 2026 the headquarters of the Children’s Eternal Rainforest in Monteverde Costa Rica.

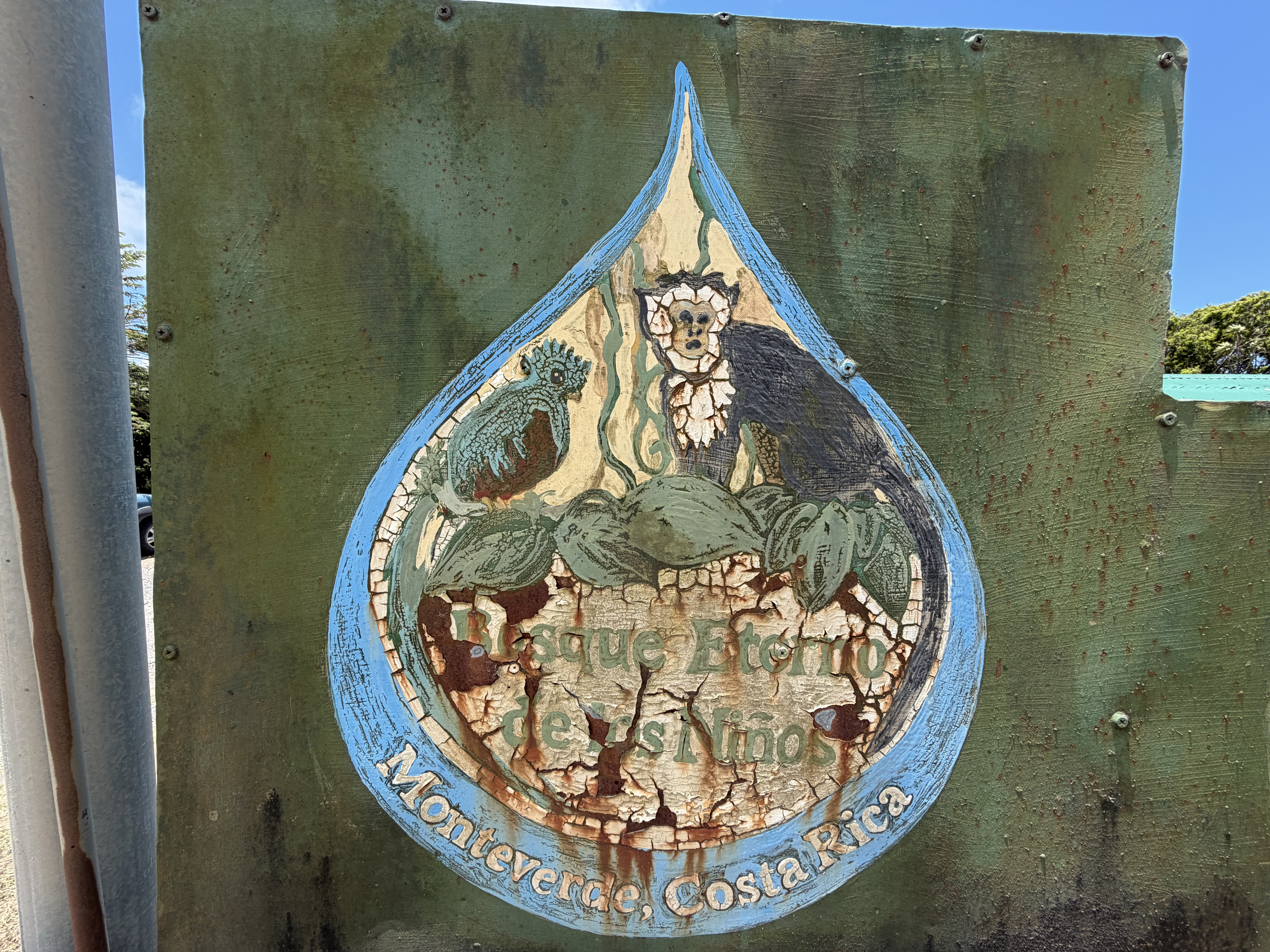
Logo of the Children’s Eternal Rainforest

By 1998 the Children's Eternal Rainforest was the largest private biological reserve in Central America, spanning 18,000 hectares (44,000 acres) in the Guanacaste, Alajuela, and Puntarenas provinces.

== Biology ==
The preserve's 23,000 hectares is one of the most biodiverse areas on Earth. It contains 450 species of birds, which is about 50% of Costa Rica's total avifaunal diversity, including several well-known threatened species such as the resplendent quetzal (Pharomachrus mocinno) and the bare-necked umbrellabird (Cephalopterus glabricollis). It also has the largest number of orchid species of any single location on Earth. Because of the large altitudinal gradient and protected lands on both the Pacific and Caribbean slopes, species composition varies dramatically at different locations.

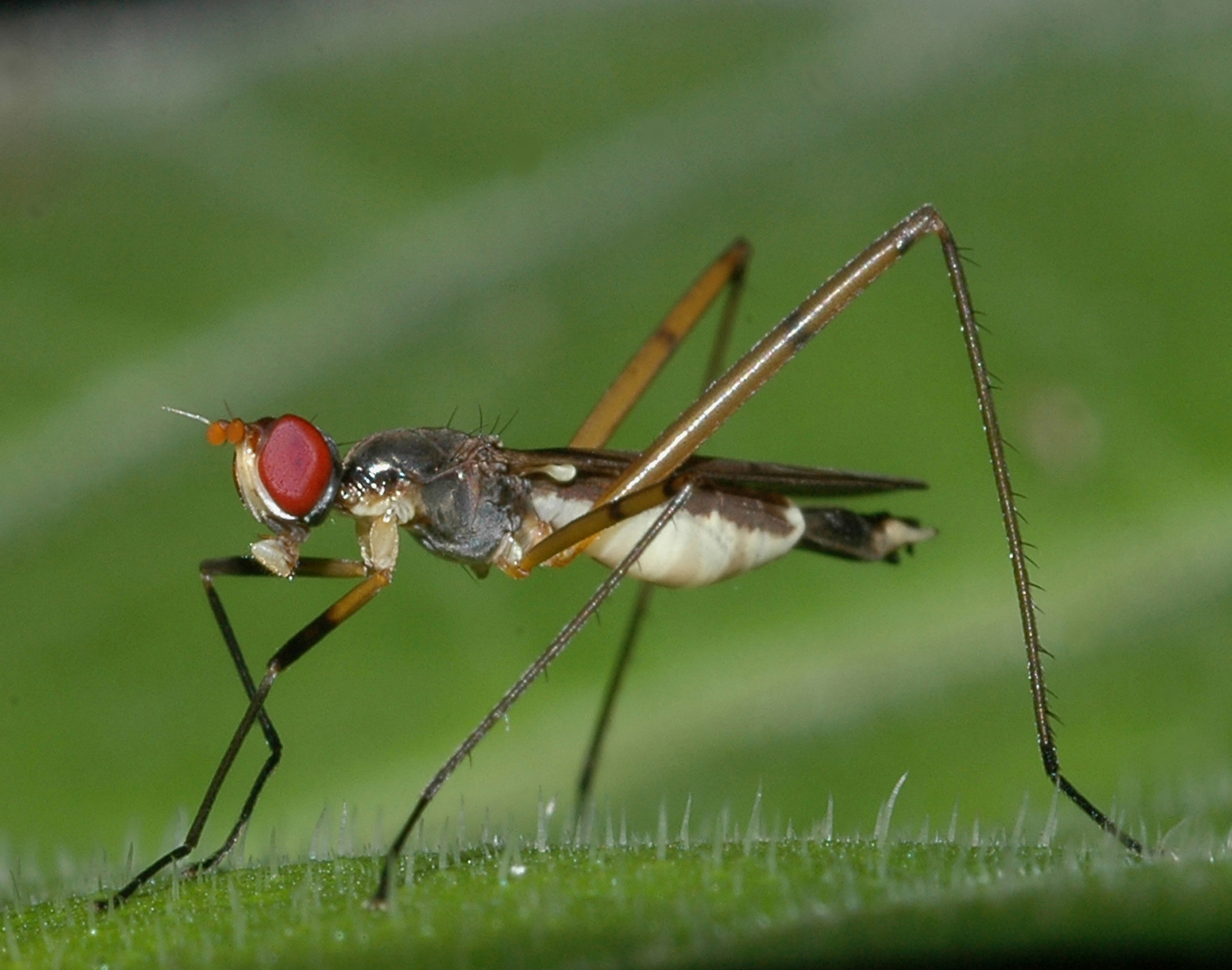
An unknown fly; one of many thousands of species found in the Children's Eternal Rainforest

Mammal diversity is high with most large Costa Rican species surviving in the preserve including three species of monkey, two species of sloth, and all six species of cats found in Costa Rica. However, hunting pressure and habitat loss in surrounding areas has caused declines of a few mammals and local extirpation of others (e.g., white-lipped peccary, Tayassu pecari).

Because of deforestation around the Tilarán Mountains, the Children's Eternal Rainforest and adjacent protected areas are now an island of natural habitat limiting dispersal of some animals. However, biological corridors connecting other nearby protected areas are still possible.

== Facilities ==
There are four locations for visitors to experience the preserve: Bajo del Tigre, San Gerardo Station, Pocosol Station, and Finca Stellar. All offer hiking trails in the forest and San Gerardo and Pocosol offer overnight lodging and meals. San Gerardo, located deep in the forest and overlooking the Arenal Volcano is a particularly scenic location with abundant wildlife.
