= The Nest (aviary) =

El Nido (The Nest)

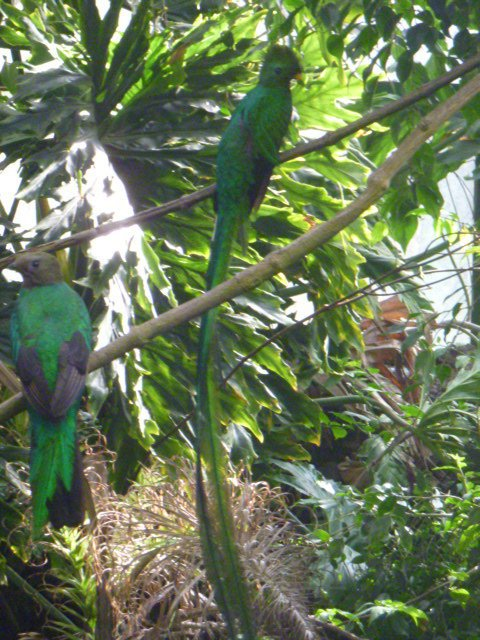
- Quetzales adapted to captivity in the bird's nest Ixtapaluca
- Interactive map of El Nido (The Nest)
- 19°19′5″N 98°53′28″W
- Location: Ixtapaluca, Mexico
- Land area: 7 hectares (17 acres)
- No. of species: 300+
- Website: https://elnido.mx

The Nest (Spanish: El Nido) is an aviary located in Ixtapaluca, state of Mexico. Founded by veterinarian Jesús López Estudillo in the 1960s, it is a civil association created to preserve over 300 different species of birds, both Mexican and the rest of South America, Africa and Asia, mostly endangered. The association—formerly known as Wildlife (Spanish: Vida Silvestre)—also has a space for breeding and conservation of the most endangered species.

The Nest is the most diverse aviary in the world and the third largest in Latin America. The logo is the quetzal, as Jesús López Estudillo was the first to achieve captive breeding of the bird, which had been a traditional symbol of freedom, characterized by not being able to survive outside its native habitat.

== History ==
The origins of the Nest began in the era of the sixties, when the veterinarian Jesús López Estudillo decided to buy land with eight acres containing 10,000 trees and plants devoted to research, conservation and breeding of endangered birds. His passion for these animals led him to bring together endangered birds and perform several experiments to recreate their habitat so they could be kept in captivity. Thus, he could observe their behavior and thereby create projects that would allow the reproduction and repopulate the species most threatened by human activity and climate change.

The space was mainly open to the scientific community specializing in birds, but to promote information sharing, the site was opened to the public in 2003 as an environmental education center. It allows humans to interact with nature and is designed for younger generations to teach them of the importance of conserving these species.

== Logo ==
The representative bird of place and that is within your logo is the quetzal (pharomachrus), as Dr. José López Estudillo was the first to successfully recreate their habitat.

In 2012, the incubator birth of one of the chicks quetzal was aired on the Internet. The importance is that the breeding season of this bird is only once a year, where the female produces 2 eggs.

This bird is an important part of the pre-Hispanic mythology, as his name is known in Nahuatl as gorgeous or beautiful. Formerly, feathers that are characterized by up to 90 cm long, were part of the plume of the Emperor Moctezuma, and elderly priests.

== Other areas ==
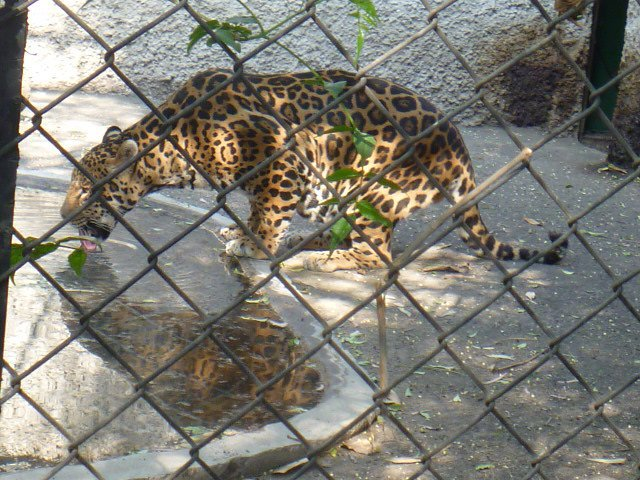
Jaguar in captivity

The site added exhibition areas for cats, primates, raptors, and exotic birds, focusing on the expanded problem of extinction.

=== Cats ===
An area specially adapted for the stay of different cats like the jaguar, tiger, and panther, which form an important part in nature. They are currently among the most endangered species in the world.

=== Primates ===
A place for primates, particularly the spider monkey and ape Jester.

=== Raptors ===
A space for birds of prey, birds that hunt prey to feed using their beaks and sharp claws. Among the best known species are falcons, hawks, owls, and the golden eagle.

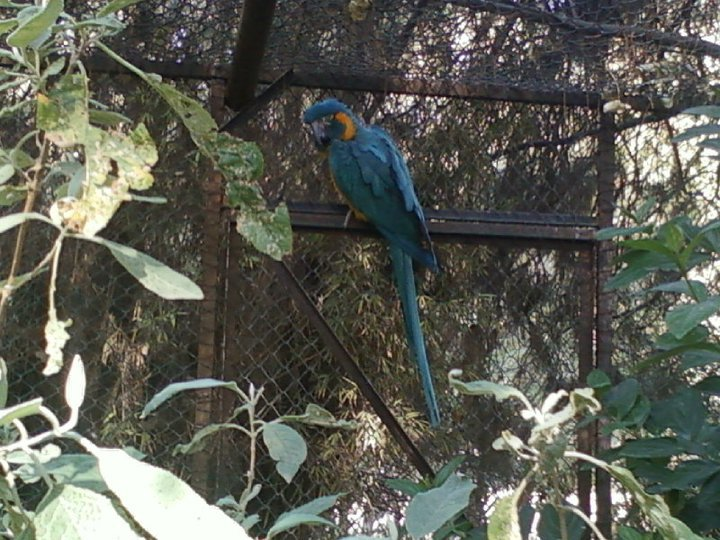
Blue Macaw adapted to captivity

=== Exotic birds ===
A region for birds adapted different ecosystems. The variety of species found are mainly Mexican, which are mainly located in states like Chiapas and Yucatán. Birds from other continents include are toucans, herons, flamingos, peacocks, and macaws.

== See also ==
- Pharomachrus
- Ixtapaluca
