= Rabin Ajaw =

Contemporary Mayan festival in Guatemala

Rabin Ajaw also known as Rabin Ajau or Rab'in Ajaw, is an annual indigenous Mayan festival held in the Verapaces area of Guatemala, with the focus being in the city of Cobán. It is celebrated on the last Saturday of July. It is considered the largest and most important Mayan festival. In addition to fireworks, processions in traditional clothing and traditional dances are mainstays of the festival. In the Q'eqchi Mayan language, the name of the festival translates to "the king's daughter".

== Selection of the Queen ==
The main event in Cobán is the selection of a Queen among indigenous contestants.

Participation requirements are:

- young (no technical age limit, but 18-24 preferred) woman of Mayan descent
- literate
- no kinship with organizers, committee members, or judges
- have not participated in previous years
- not in a relationship. the winner is also required to remain single for a year after winning.

All participants of the contest give a preliminary speech on one of seven predetermined topics in both Spanish and their native Mayan. Knowledge of the Mayan language is important. In her study, Elizabet Rasch recounts stories of individual contestants who were humiliated for not being able to speak their native language. Thirteen contestants are then chosen to answer additional questions on multiple topics, after which the judges select one winner.

The outgoing queen crowns the new queen. The crown is silver with three quetzal feathers, which is the national bird of Guatemala. The Queen's input on important community issues is valued.

Celebrations begin in the evening, usually starting at 8 PM or later.

== History ==
A fair with a beauty pageant had been held in Cobán since the 1930s.

In 1969, professor Marco Aurelio Alonzo proposed the creation of Rabin Ajaw as a separate festival to commemorate the founding of Cobán. Rasch describes the rise of indigenous beauty pageants such as the Rabin Ajaw from the 1930s on as a way to reappropriate indigenous culture. Beginning in the 1970s, the narrative of the pageants became increasingly political and reflective of Mayan identity.

In the early 2000s, several Indigenous organizers protested the event, saying it "folklorizes Mayan culture".
