= Chicabnab =

- Hamlet
- Interactive map of Chicabnab
- Coordinates: 15.444903°N 91.201072°W
- Country: Guatemala
- Department: Alta Verapaz
- Municipality: San Juan Chamelco

Population
  - Languages: Q'eqchi'
- Time zone: CST
- Postal code: 16010

Chicabnab is a Q'eqchi' Maya village within the San Juan Chamelco Municipality of the Alta Verapaz Department of Guatemala.

== Economy ==
The main economy of Chicabnab is ecotourism. Tourists come for guided tours of the surrounding forests, where Quetzals are very common.

== Transport ==
No roads lead directly into the village, but within a two-hour walk of the village buses can be taken to San Pedro Carchá.
