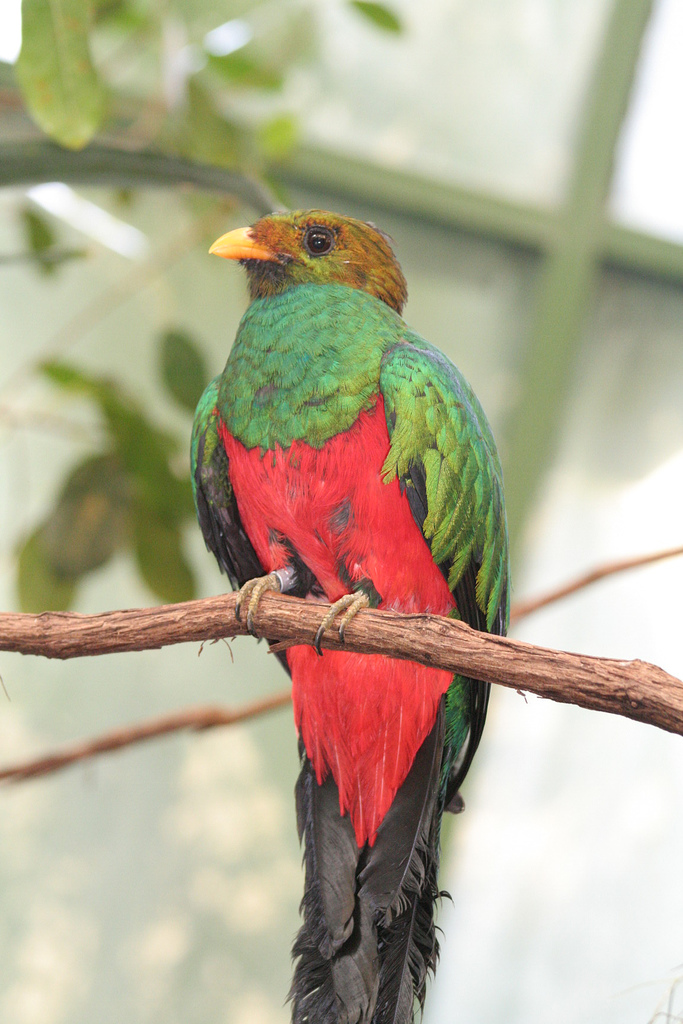
- Male

Conservation status
- Least Concern (IUCN 3.1)

Scientific classification
- Kingdom: Animalia
- Phylum: Chordata
- Class: Aves
- Order: Trogoniformes
- Family: Trogonidae
- Genus: Pharomachrus
- Species: P. auriceps

Binomial name
- Pharomachrus auriceps (Gould, 1842)

Audio

= Golden-headed quetzal =

Species of bird

The golden-headed quetzal or corequenque (Pharomachrus auriceps) is a strikingly coloured bird in the genus Pharomachrus. It is found in moist mid-elevation forests from eastern Panama to northern Bolivia.

The golden-headed quetzal is known for its iridescent green colour, which it shares with other quetzals, and its distinctive golden head. The female of the species is less brightly coloured, displaying more brown tones than the male. The golden-headed quetzal's diet consists mainly of fruit, and occasionally insects. It is generally a solitary and quiet bird unless it is breeding season, when the male and female become a monogamous pair and create a cavity nest in an old tree. During breeding season both sexes share brooding and feeding duties for 25–30 days until the chick is ready to fledge. The golden-headed quetzal is fairly common and considered a species of least concern.

== Taxonomy ==
The golden-headed quetzal, also known by the Spanish name pilco real, was first described by John Gould in the 2nd edition of A Monograph of the Trogonidae or family of Trogons published in 1875. It is one of five birds in the genus Pharomachrus, known as quetzals, and is included in the family Trogonidae, which is made up of birds found in tropical rainforests worldwide.

The word quetzal comes from the Nahuatl (the Aztec language) word quetzalli (from the root quetz meaning "stand"), which translates to "long green plume" or "tail feather of the quetzal". Quetzal is usually specifically used to refer to the resplendent quetzal (Pharomachrus mocinno) first described by Pablo de la Llave in 1832 but in reality it applies to all members of the genera Pharomachrus and Euptilotis.

Pharomachrus, coined by Pablo de la Llave, stems from Ancient Greek pharos meaning "mantle" or "cloak" and makros meaning "long" in reference to the impressive tail of the resplendent quetzal.

Two subspecies are recognized, P. a. auriceps (Gould, 1842) and P. a. hargitti (Oustalet, 1891). The species name, auriceps, comes from Latin aurum meaning "gold" and ceps meaning "crowned" or "headed", in reference to the golden head of Pharomachrus auriceps.

== Description ==
The golden-headed quetzal weighs between 154–182g. It has a wingspan of 30–36 cm and a length of 33–36 cm with tail plumes adding another 8–10 cm. Like other members of the genus Pharomachrus, the golden-headed quetzal is known for its iridescent golden-green wings and breast, which can appear blue depending on the light. The female's breast is a duller brownish colour; her head is also a duller golden-brown when compared to the male's gold-bronze head, from which the species name is derived. Their bills are short and broad; they appear yellow in males and a brownish greyish in females. The quetzal's uppertail coverts are darker green and extend beyond the tip of the tail, more so in the male than in the female. Both the male and the female have a black undertail, though the female sometimes displays greyish-black tips. The feathers on the lower breast of both sexes are a brilliant red colour. Both sexes, like other trogons, also have heterodactyl feet, with the first and second toes facing backwards and the third and fourth toes facing forward. Their legs and feet are an olive green or a brownish colour. The young golden-headed quetzal is a brownish black colour with a few iridescent green feathers on the neck and breast, and lacking the tail coverts of the adult. The golden-headed male quetzal differs from other quetzals in its lack of a crest of head feathers.

P. a. hargitti is distinguished from the nominate race by its longer tail and slightly more golden colour.

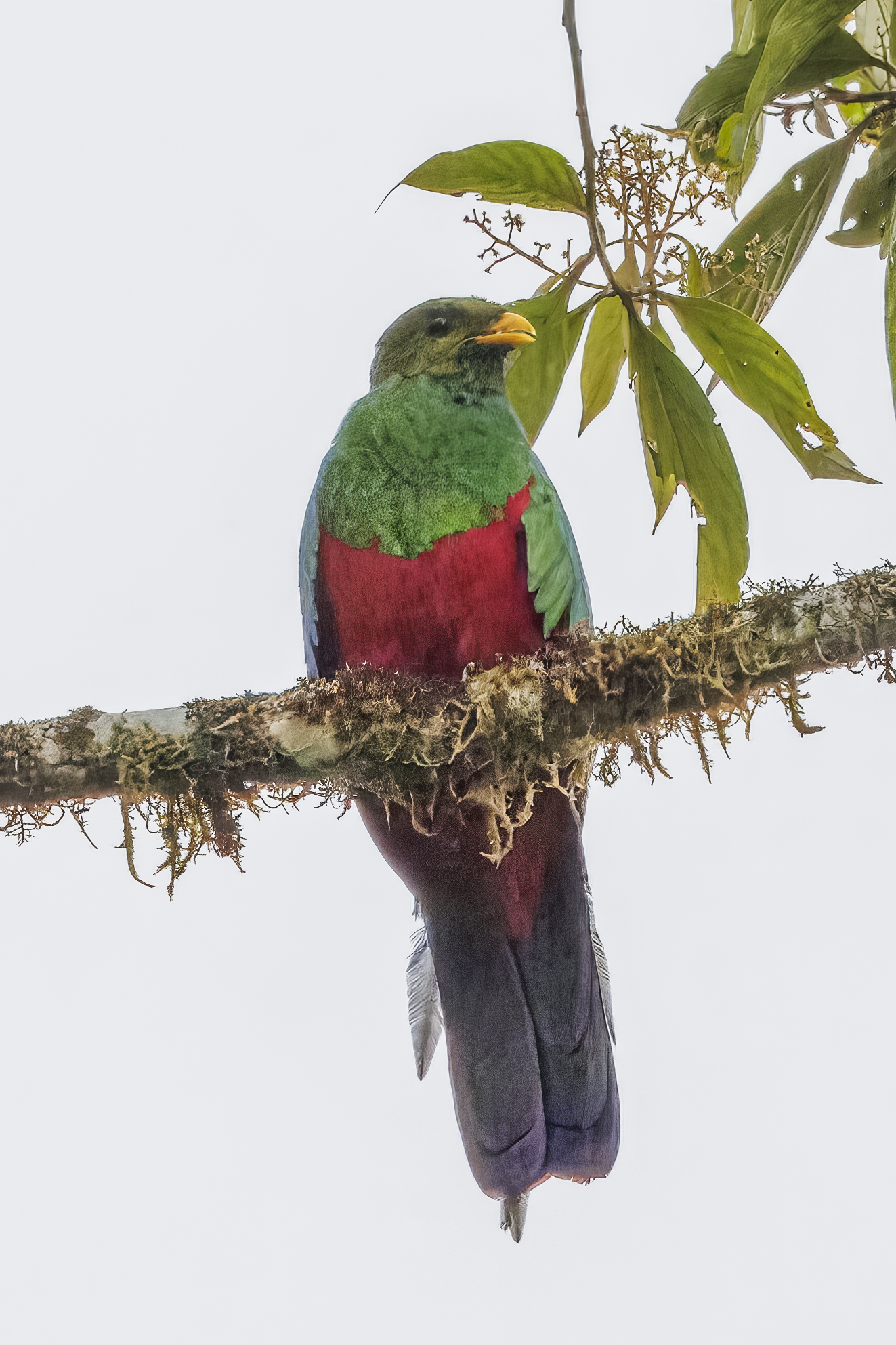
male, Ecuador

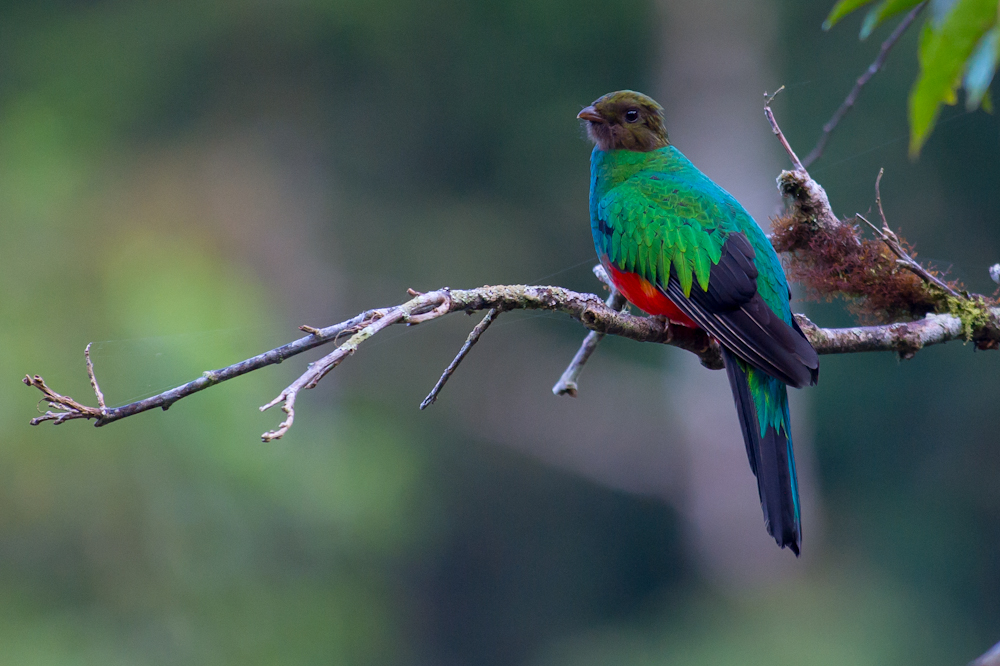
female, Peru

== Habitat and distribution ==
Golden-headed quetzals inhabit areas of Central and South America. P. a. auriceps is found in eastern Panama (Cerro Pirre mountain) as well as in the Andes spanning from southern Colombia to eastern Peru and northern Bolivia. P. a. hargitti is only found in the Andes of Venezuela.

Their natural habitat is most commonly humid and wet moderate-elevation montane and foothill forests although they have also been seen less frequently on the forest edge and in clearings as well as in temperate cloud forests and elfin forests. They reside at elevations ranging from 1200m to 3100m.

== Behaviour ==
=== Vocalizations ===
The golden-headed quetzal is a quiet bird, often sitting quietly motionless for long periods of time. When it does vocalize, its far-carrying call is very distinctive, sounding like mournful, hawk-like whistles, repeated 6-8 times ("whe-wheeu, whe-wheuu, whe-wheeu…"). Its other calls are a horse-like whinnying ("why-dy-dy-dy-dyyrrr", "hoo-whoooooy") and a throaty melancholy "ka-kaaaur".

All birds in the family Trogonidae appear to be very responsive to recordings of their calls, which could indicate that their vocalizations are a territorial behaviour.

=== Diet ===
The golden-headed quetzal's diet consists mainly of fruit, though it has also been known to eat insects. Remsen et al. (1993) found that the stomach contents of P. auriceps were "fruit only" 87.5% of the time and "arthropods and fruit" 12.5% of the time. The quetzal's fruit-heavy diet makes it a very important species for the dispersal of the fruits' seeds.

It is also thought that, like other quetzals, the golden-headed quetzal feeds on small vertebrates such as frogs and lizards. However, this has been brought into question by Lohnes and Greeney (2008) who found the diet of P. auriceps was much less varied since they never observed it feeding on any animal matter other than insects while observing the species for 22 days. Their observations also confirmed that the formerly accepted idea that quetzals did not feed their hatchlings fruit until ten days after hatching was untrue.

=== Reproduction ===
Golden-headed quetzals are usually solitary birds but, during breeding, they are seasonally monogamous. The male attracts the female by establishing a territory and advertising it by singing.

Once a pair is formed they must find a suitable location for their nest and share the work of excavating it. All trogons are cavity-nesters; golden-headed quetzals specifically excavate decaying tree trunks with their beaks or modify existing hollow spots in old trees. Quetzals form shallow, more open, unlined cavities from which part of the bird (head or tail) is usually visible. It can be difficult for the quetzal to find an appropriate site for their nest since the dead tree must be soft enough for them to carve but not too rotten as to be unable to support their nest. For this reason quetzals investigate multiple trees before finding a suitable site.

The copulatory behaviour of quetzals is not well known since they appear to be discreet in their mating. The golden-headed quetzal has been observed breeding once a year between the months of February and June. The female lays 1-2 pale blue eggs and then incubates them the majority of the time (18–19 days of incubation) except for one long daily incubation period undertaken by the male.

Golden-headed quetzals remain in the nest for 25–30 days before fledging. They are born blind and naked, like all trogons, and it is at about 3 days before fledging that the nestling develops its final juvenile plumage appearing mostly brown and black but with visible green plumage, particularly on the nape, upper back, and throat.

Brooding duties are shared equally between the male and female golden-headed quetzal. The first 8–14 days after hatching, adults are present in the nest and brooding 60-90% of each day, after which brooding drops rapidly. There appears to be no clear pattern to when the female or male broods, however, it was observed that the male consistently broods for longer near the start of the brooding period, while the female broods more near the end of that period. It is also believed that it is exclusively the female quetzal that broods at night. Feeding duties are also shared equally between the sexes, with the non-brooding adult arriving with food before changing places with the brooding adult. When changing places, the adults seem to observe a ritual, with the incoming adult perching above the nest and emitting a whinnying call to signal the brooding adult to depart the nest. While brooding, the adults enter the nest to feed the nestling; when brooding ends, the adults initially continue to enter the nest but spend less time inside before leaving; at 8 days before fledging they simply lean in to feed the chick before departing; finally at 4–6 days before fledging the chick is able to perch on the lip of the nest and is fed from there before the adult departs. The food the adults bring to the nestling is usually insects, but also fruit. On the day of fledging the chick perches at the front of the nest and flies away, remaining near the nest for some time before leaving the area. Unlike other trogons, but like other quetzals, the golden-headed quetzal seems to maintain a clean nest by either removing or more often swallowing all droppings.

== Status and conservation ==
The golden-headed quetzal is fairly common in its range and is considered a species of least concern.
