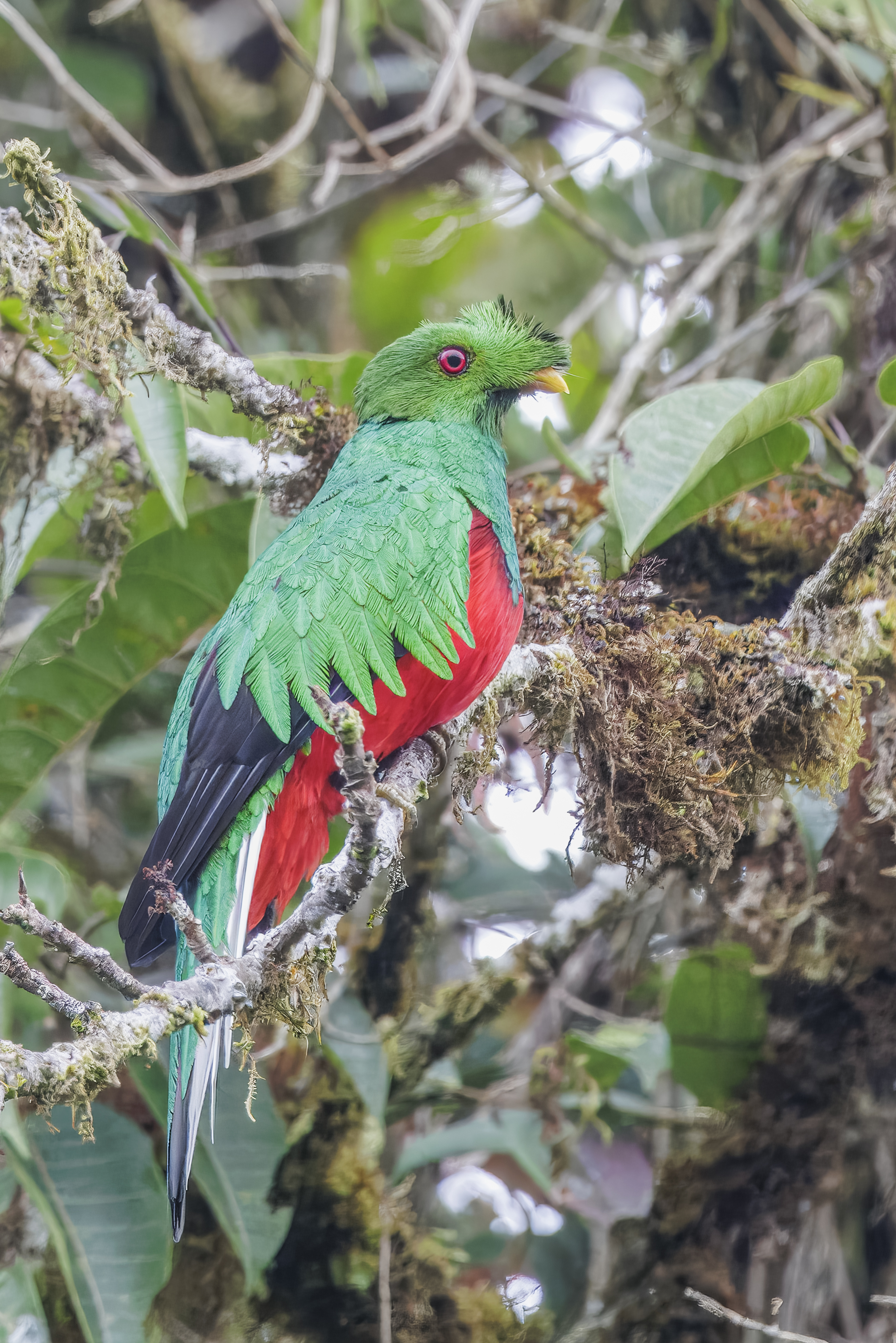
- Male, near Cosanga, Ecuador
- Voice

Conservation status
- Least Concern (IUCN 3.1)

Scientific classification
- Kingdom: Animalia
- Phylum: Chordata
- Class: Aves
- Order: Trogoniformes
- Family: Trogonidae
- Genus: Pharomachrus
- Species: P. antisianus

Binomial name
- Pharomachrus antisianus (D'Orbigny, 1837)

Synonyms
- Trogon antisianus D'Orbigny

= Crested quetzal =

Species of bird

The crested quetzal (Pharomachrus antisianus) is a species of bird in the family Trogonidae native to South America, where it is found in Bolivia, Colombia, Ecuador, Peru, and Venezuela. Its natural habitat is subtropical or tropical moist montane forests.

== Taxonomy ==
French naturalist Alcide d'Orbigny described the crested quetzal in 1837 as Trogon antisianus. The species name is derived from Antis, a Latinised version of the Andes, ultimately from anti, an Incan word for copper. It is closely related to the resplendent quetzal (P. mocinno).

It is one of five species of the genus Pharomachrus known as quetzals. The term "quetzal" was originally used for just the resplendent quetzal, but is now applied to all members of the genera Pharomachrus and Euptilotis.

== Description ==
Adult birds are 33–34 cm (13–13 1/2 in) long. The head and upperparts of the adult male are metallic green, while its breast and belly are red. Alone among the quetzals, the male has a short crest above its short bill, which is orange. The vent is white. Females have brown heads and upper breast and no crest.

== Distribution and habitat ==
The crested quetzal is found along the Andes from Bolivia through Ecuador, Peru and Colombia to Venezuela, in pristine and mature second-growth forest from 1,200–3,000 m (4,000–10,000 ft) in altitude. It has been rated as least concern on the IUCN Red List of Threatened Species as it has a large range and its population appears to be stable.

== Feeding ==
The crested quetzal is frugivorous. Adults raising young also catch more nutritious prey such as arthropods and small vertebrates; one such item recorded was the glassfrog species Hyalinobatrachium pallidum.
