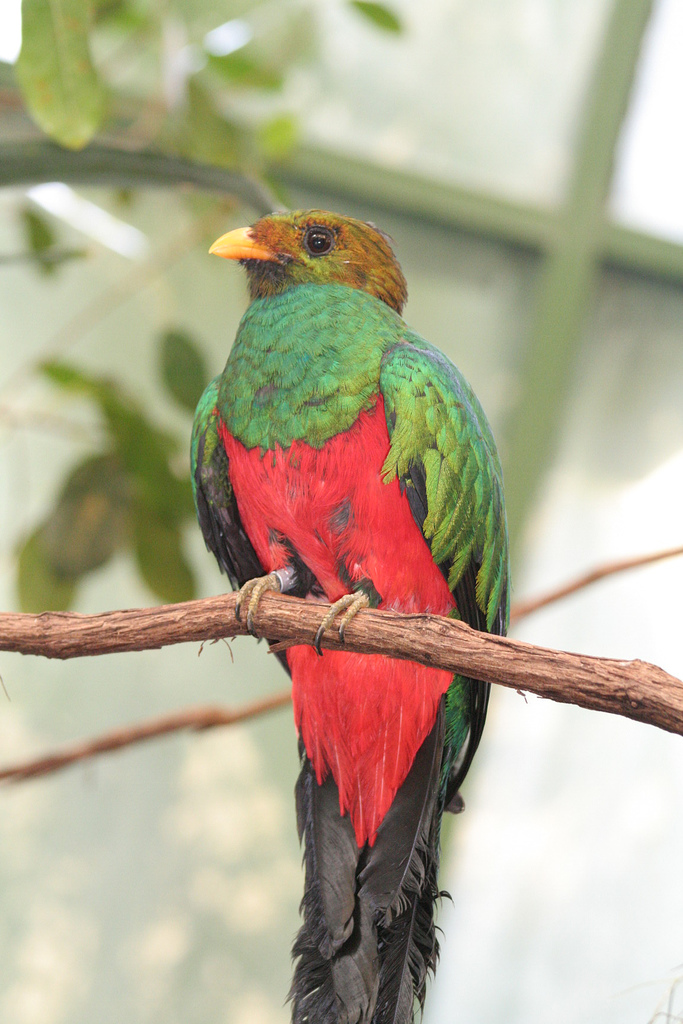
- Golden-headed quetzal

Scientific classification
- Kingdom: Animalia
- Phylum: Chordata
- Class: Aves
- Order: Trogoniformes
- Family: Trogonidae

Groups included
- Pharomachrus; Euptilotis

= Quetzal =

Group of birds

Quetzals (/kɛtˈsɑːl, ˈkɛtsəl/) are strikingly colored birds in the trogon family. They are found in forests, especially in humid highlands, with the five species from the genus Pharomachrus being exclusively Neotropical, while a single species, the eared quetzal, Euptilotis neoxenus, is found in Guatemala, sometimes in Mexico and very locally in the southernmost United States. In the highlands of the states of Sonora, Chihuahua, Sinaloa, Durango, Nayarit, Zacatecas, Jalisco, and Michoacán, the eared quetzal can be found from northwest to west-central Mexico. It is a Mesoamerican indigenous species, but some reports show that it occasionally travels and nests in southeastern Arizona and New Mexico in the United States. June to October is the mating season for eared quetzals. Quetzals are fairly large (all over 32 cm (13 in) long), slightly bigger than other trogon species. The resplendent quetzal is the national bird of Guatemala because of its vibrant colour and cultural significance to the Maya.

== Physical attributes ==
Quetzals have iridescent green or golden-green wing coverts, back, chest and head, with a red belly. Their wings are suited to camouflage under rainy conditions, because their feathers blend well with wet and shiny green area. They are strongly sexually dimorphic, and parts of the females' plumage are brown or grey. The tails of the male quetzals may take up to three years after reaching maturity to grow to the maximum length. These largely solitary birds feed on fruits, berries, insects and small vertebrates (such as frogs). Even with their famous bright plumage, they can be hard to see in their natural wooded habitats.

== Conservation status ==
None of the many quetzal species are under immediate threat in the wild, although the eared and resplendent quetzal are at the Near Threatened status. Pharomachrus mocinno is dependent on standing dead and mature trees for breeding holes, which are only formed in primary cloud forest; the species' breeding behavior is linked to the long term existence of these forests such as the few remaining in highland Guatemala. The remaining are not considered threatened by the IUCN and all are locally common. Among the most concentrated populations are the Baja Verapaz part of the Sierra de las Minas and the Chicabnab Reserve of Alta Verapaz. However, it should be kept in mind while despite the fact that quetzals typically inhabit cloud forests, the fact that they are being divided into much smaller patches is what is known as a principal threat to their survival. Another major threat to these animals is poaching. Since their feathers are still seen as an artifact poachers use their feather as trade to foreign tourists and museum collectors, but also are used for medicines and rituals. Deforestation is eliminating their natural habitat causing them to relocate to other areas. Resplendent Quetzals are known to relocate in lower elevated areas during the summertime when precipitation is known to increase, their patterns in movement are most likely correlated to a surplus of ripe Lauraceae fruits.

== Etymology ==
The name quetzal is from Nahuatl quetzalli [keˈt͡salːi], "large brilliant tail feather" (American Audubon Dictionary) or "tail coverts of the quetzal" (Merriam-Webster's Collegiate Dictionary), from the Nahuatl root quetz = "stand up" used to refer to an upstanding plume of feathers. The word entered English through Spanish. The quetzal plays a central role in Mesoamerican mythology and is associated with the Aztec deity Quetzalcoatl.

The word quetzal was originally used for just the resplendent quetzal, the long-tailed quetzal of Guatemala, (more specifically the area of Northern Guatemala known as the Petén) which is the national bird and the name of the currency of Guatemala. It still often refers to that bird specifically but now also names all the species of the genera Pharomachrus and Euptilotis.

The genus name Pharomachrus is from Ancient Greek φάρος (pháros), meaning "mantle", and μακρός (makrós), meaning "long", referring to the long wing and tail coverts of the resplendent quetzal (the second h is unexplained).

The quetzal is also known in Peru as the pilco.

== Cultural significance ==
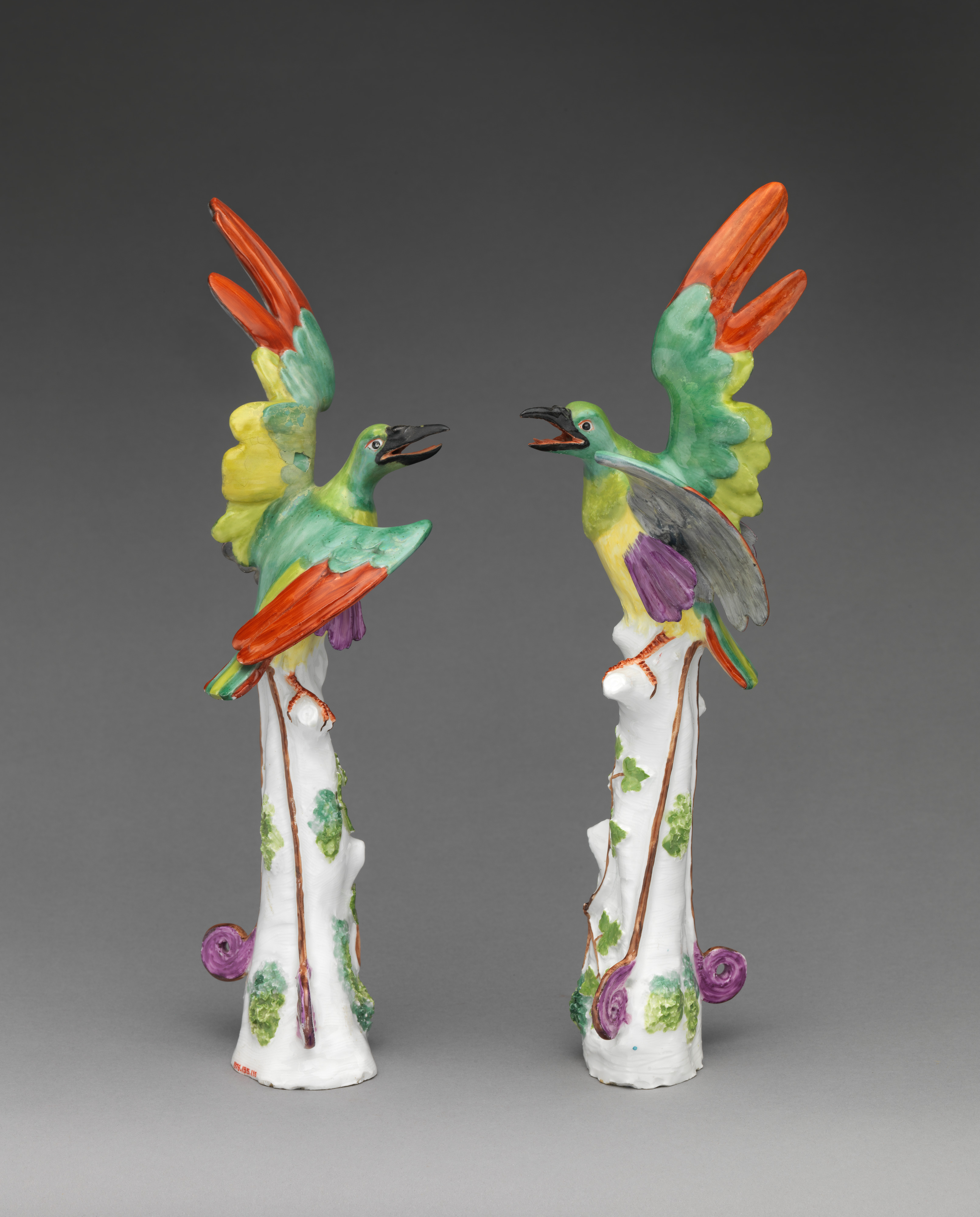
Pair of quetzal figurines, 1733, hard-paste porcelain, overall: 31.8 x 9.2 x 8.3 cm, Metropolitan Museum of Art (New York City)

The Quetzal has long been significantly important for the ancient Maya and Aztecs. Their feathers were considered luxury goods to represent high status and are often seen in the headdresses of the emperors and other costume elements.

== Species ==
Genus Pharomachrus:

- Crested quetzal, Pharomachrus antisianus.
- Golden-headed quetzal, Pharomachrus auriceps.
- White-tipped quetzal, Pharomachrus fulgidus.
- Resplendent quetzal, Pharomachrus mocinno.
- Pavonine quetzal, Pharomachrus pavoninus.

Genus Euptilotis:

- Eared quetzal, Euptilotis neoxenus is related to Pharomachrus and is called the eared quetzal by some authorities, such as the American Ornithologists' Union, but the eared trogon by others.

== See also ==
- List of English words of Nahuatl origin
- The Nest (aviary)
