= Postal codes in Guatemala =

Postal codes in Guatemala are 5 digit numeric. The first two numbers identify the department, the third number the route/municipality and the last two the office.

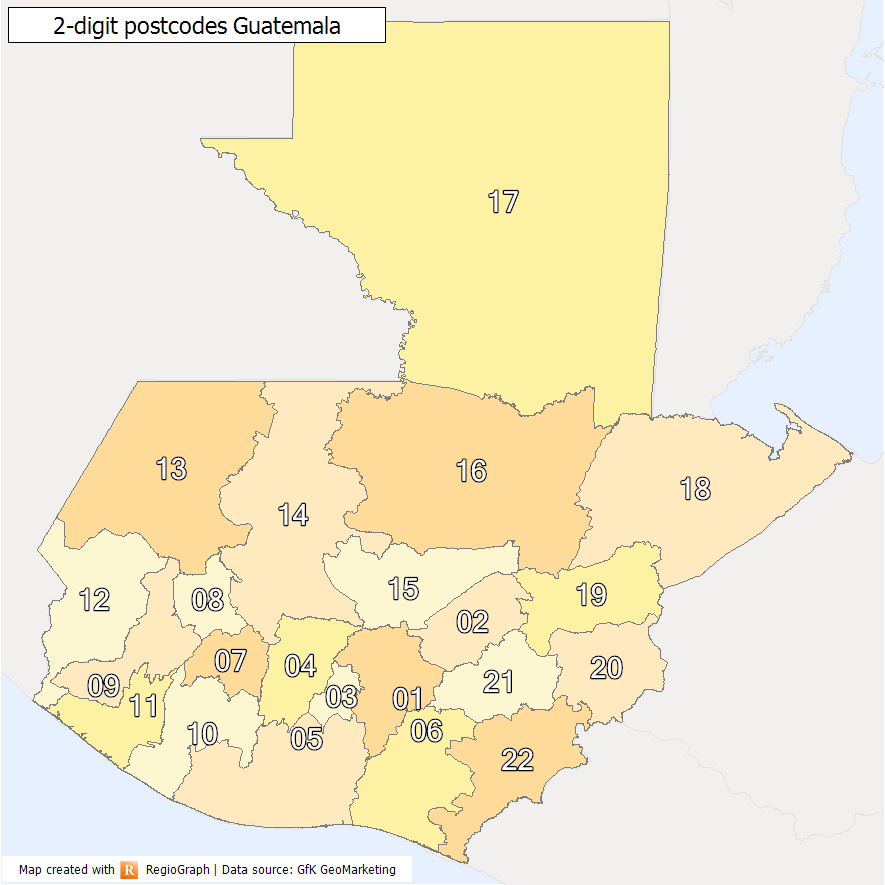
2-digit postcode map of Guatemala
