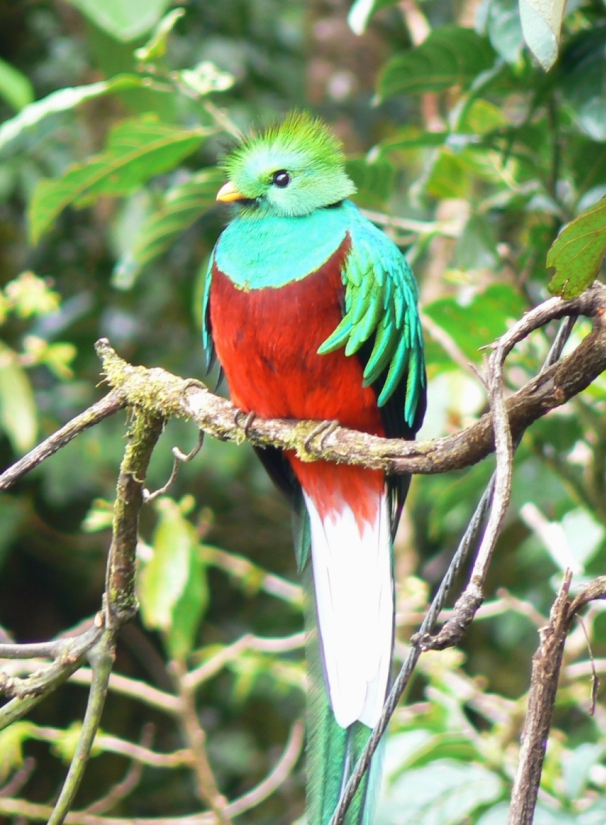
- Resplendent quetzal

Scientific classification
- Kingdom: Animalia
- Phylum: Chordata
- Class: Aves
- Order: Trogoniformes
- Family: Trogonidae
- Genus: Pharomachrus de la Llave, 1832

Type species
- Pharomachrus mocinno de la Llave, 1832

Species
- P. antisianus P. auriceps P. fulgidus P. mocinno P. pavoninus

= Pharomachrus =

Genus of birds

Pharomachrus is a genus of birds in the family Trogonidae.

The five species of this genus and the eared quetzal, the only living member of the genus Euptilotis, together make up a group of colourful birds called quetzals.

== Species ==
Image	Scientific name	Common name	Distribution
	Pharomachrus antisianus	Crested quetzal	Bolivia, Colombia, Ecuador, Peru, and Venezuela
	Pharomachrus auriceps	Golden-headed quetzal	eastern Panama to northern Bolivia.
	Pharomachrus fulgidus	White-tipped quetzal	Venezuela, Colombia, and Guyana
	Pharomachrus mocinno	Resplendent quetzal	Chiapas, Mexico to western Panama
	Pharomachrus pavoninus	Pavonine quetzal	Brazil and Venezuela, southeastern Colombia, eastern Ecuador and Peru, and northern Bolivia
