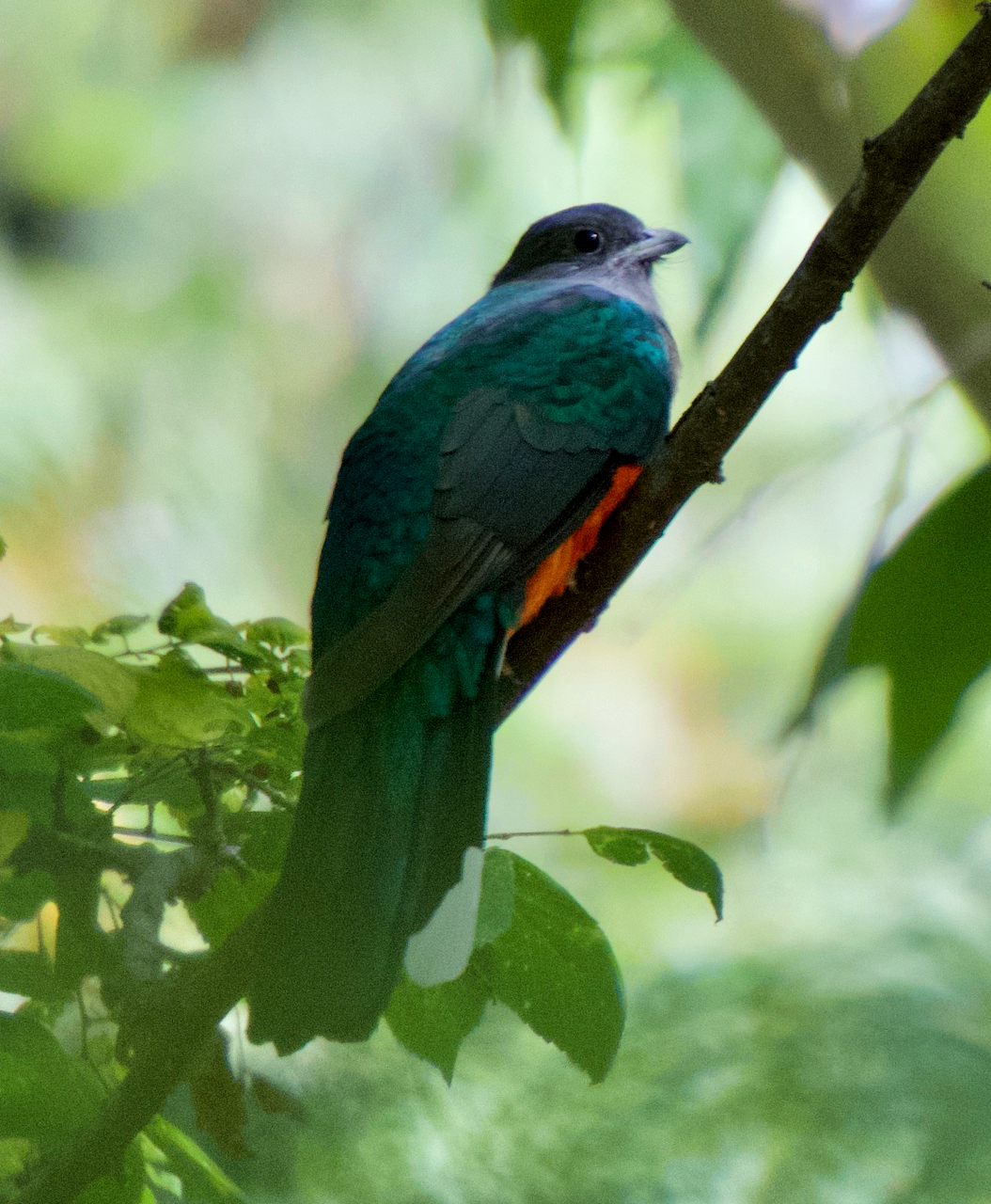
- A male eared quetzal in the Chiricahua Mountains.

Conservation status
- Least Concern (IUCN 3.1)

- Vulnerable (NatureServe)

Scientific classification
- Kingdom: Animalia
- Phylum: Chordata
- Class: Aves
- Order: Trogoniformes
- Family: Trogonidae
- Genus: Euptilotis; Gould, 1858
- Species: E. neoxenus

Binomial name
- Euptilotis neoxenus (Gould, 1838)

Synonyms
- Trogon neoxenus (protonym); Leptuas neoxenus

= Eared quetzal =

Species of bird

The eared quetzal (Euptilotis neoxenus), also known as the eared trogon, is a species of bird in the trogon family, Trogonidae. It is native to streamside pine-oak forests and canyons in the Sierra Madre Occidental of Mexico from northern Sonora and Chihuahua south to western Michoacán. The species has occurred on rare occasions in southeastern Arizona, where it has been recorded nesting.

== Taxonomy ==
The eared quetzal was described and illustrated in 1838 by the English ornithologist and bird artist John Gould in his book A Monograph of the Trogonidae, or Family of Trogons based on a specimen collected in Mexico. He coined the binomial name Trogon neoxenus. In 1858, in the second edition of his book, Gould placed the species in its own genus Euptilotis to give the current binomial name Euptilotis neoxenus. The eared quetzal is the only species placed in the genus. The specific epithet combines the Ancient Greek neos meaning "new" with xenos meaning "stranger", "guest" or "visitor". The genus name Euptilotis combines the Ancient Greek eu meaning "good" with ptilon meaning "feather" and -ōtis meaning "-eared". The species is monotypic, with no subspecies being recognized.

A molecular phylogenetic study published in 2005 found that the eared quetzal was sister to a clade containing members of the genus Pharomachrus.

== Description ==
Its body length is 33–36 cm (13–14 in). Both sexes have iridescent green backs, iridescent dark blue central tail feathers, and outer tail feathers that are predominantly white terminally with a band of black at the base (sometimes partially barred black and white in females). The bill is dull gray with a slightly darker band at the tip. The adult male has a blackish head, iridescent green breast, and geranium red belly and undertail coverts. The adult female has a gray head, breast, and upper belly and less extensive (though equally bright) red on the lower belly. Both sexes bear the wispy hair-like auricular plumes that give the species its name, though these are rarely apparent in the field. Both head and bill appear rather small and narrow in comparison to those of typical trogons.

The male's song (tremolo call) is a series of whistled notes increasing in volume. Calls include low-intensity squeals rising in pitch, a loud squeal ending with a sharp "chuck", and a strident cackle given mostly in flight.

Quetzals differ from typical New World trogons in having iridescent wing coverts, less extensive fusion between the two forward-facing toes of their heterodactyl foot, broad tails with distinctly convex (rather than straight or concave) sides, and eggs with pale blue shells. They also average larger in body size than typical trogons, and the eggs and young develop more slowly. The eared quetzal is a seemingly primitive form, lacking the impressively long iridescent upper tail and wing coverts of members of the genus Pharomachrus (including the resplendent quetzal).

== Distribution and habitat ==
It is a resident of the middle to upper levels of pine-oak woodlands and oak-conifer forests, frequently along streams.

== Behavior and ecology ==
=== Breeding ===
It nests 5–9 m (16–30 ft) high in an unlined shallow tree cavity, usually selecting an old woodpecker hole. Nests have been observed in pine, fir, maple, and aspen trees. Limited excavation of the cavity is accomplished using the bill to dig into the rotten wood of the walls and opening. The incubation and nestling periods are relatively long when compared to other species (28–31 days and 17–21 days, respectively)

The breeding season is from April to October, possibly starting earlier, as a young bird with an incompletely ossified skull has been found in mid April.

=== Food and feeding ===
Eared quetzals feed on insects, small vertebrates, and fruit, including the warty red fruit of madrone trees. Caterpillars, moths, katydids, cicadas, small lizards, and other prey are fed to the young. Like other trogons, eared quetzals often pluck prey and fruit while hovering.

Members of this species have been observed to exhibit aversion to large areas of conspicuous color on and near human observers (negative chromotropic responses), including white, red, orange, and blue. This suggests that the species-confidence hypothesis, which states that birds tend to be attracted to colors that match those found in their species and repelled by colors not found in their species, does not apply to eared quetzals.

== Status ==
Previously thought to be rare, a dedicated year-long survey in Mexico in 1995 recorded the species at 55 sites, with the bird common in suitable habitat, and little affected by logging. The first breeding record in the United States was in southern Arizona in 1991.
