= Barnens Regnskog =

Swedish nonprofit organization

Barnens Regnskog (Children's rainforest) is a Swedish nonprofit organization established in 1987, which is dedicated to raising funds for rainforest preservation. The charity supports preservation projects in Thailand, Guatemala, Belize, Costa Rica and Ecuador and has contributed to preserving 450 km^{2} (170 sq mi) of rainforest. Fundraising activities are done in Sweden as well as Germany and the United States.

== History ==
The founding of Barnens Regnskog was inspired by the fundraising of 9-year-old elementary school student Roland Tiensuu, his teacher Eha Kern and her husband Bernd Kern. In 1987 Eha Kern, while teaching at Fagerviks School in Sorunda (Nynäshamn Municipality), invited an American biologist to show slides and speak to her class about Costa Rica's Monteverde Reserve. The lecture was put into a wider context of the destruction of the tropical rainforests. The lecture had a deep impression on the children. Roland Tiensuu suggested that he and his classmates should raise funds for the Monteverde Reserve's land purchase program. They started with a bake sale, which helped raise enough money to purchase four more hectares (9.9 acres) of rainforest for the reserve. Further money was raised by the children through selling cards, painting and handicrafts. Soon after, thousands of rainforest groups were forming in schools and churches around Sweden and were put together in the Barnens Regnskog organization.

The first Barnens Regnskog rainforest reserve was established in 1989 in the Monteverde Reserve. The Barnens Regnskog part of the reserve today spans 300 km^{2} (120 sq mi).

== Awards ==
- 1990 Âret Runt
- 1990 Social Innovation Prize by Svenska Dagbladet
- 1991 Goldman Environmental Prize
