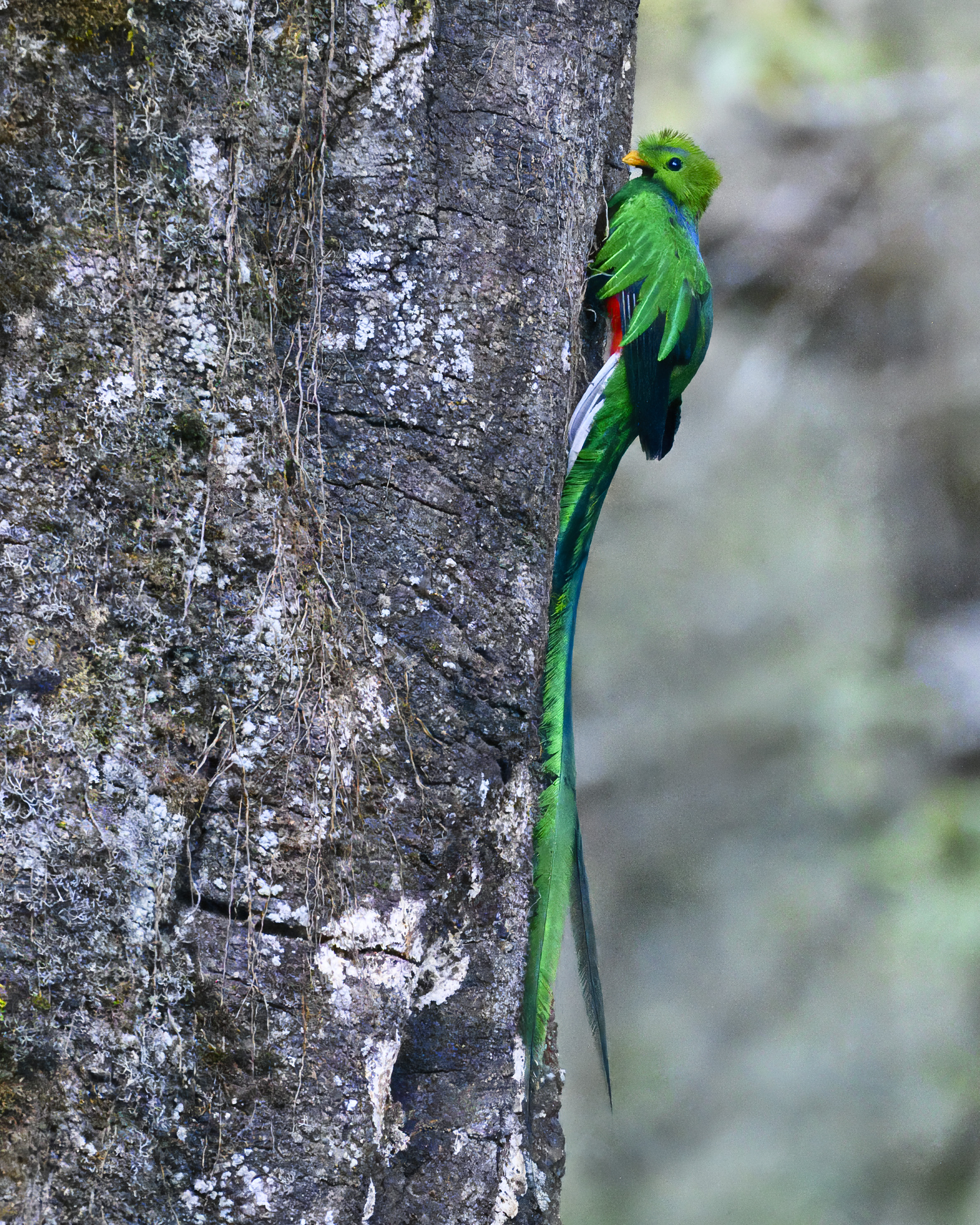
- Male in San Gerardo de Dota, Costa Rica
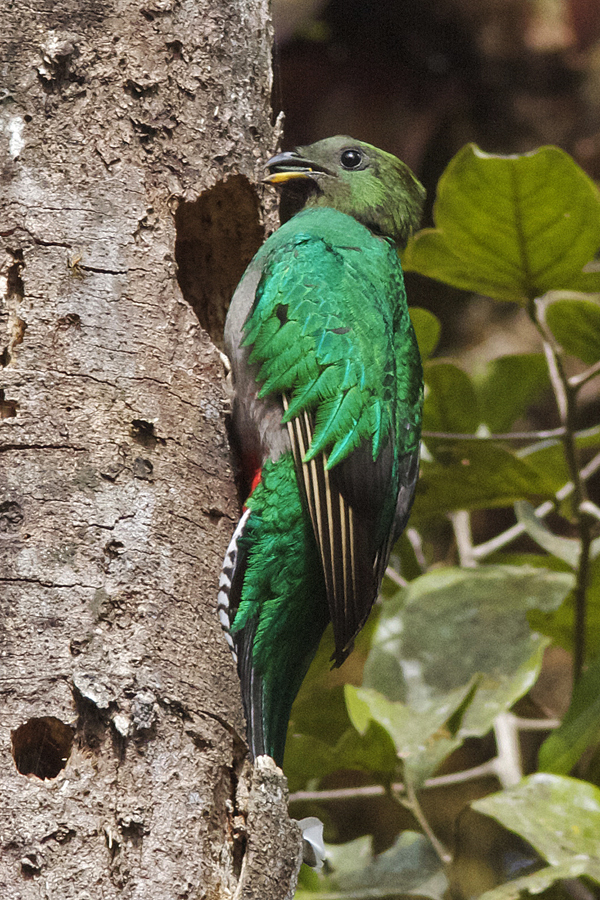
- Female at nest hole in Savegre, Costa Rica: Resplendent Quetzal song in Santiago Atitlán, Guatemala

Conservation status
- Near Threatened (IUCN 3.1)
- CITES Appendix I

Scientific classification
- Kingdom: Animalia
- Phylum: Chordata
- Class: Aves
- Order: Trogoniformes
- Family: Trogonidae
- Genus: Pharomachrus
- Species: P. mocinno

Binomial name
- Pharomachrus mocinno de la Llave, 1832

Subspecies
- Pharomachrus mocinno costaricensis Pharomachrus mocinno mocinno
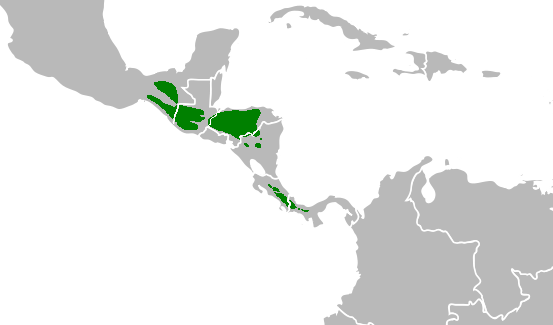
- Range of P. mocinno

= Resplendent quetzal =

Species of bird

The resplendent quetzal (Pharomachrus mocinno) is a small bird found in Central America and southern Mexico that lives in tropical forests, particularly montane cloud forests. They are part of the family Trogonidae and have two recognized subspecies, P. m. mocinno and P. m. costaricensis. Like other quetzals, the resplendent is mostly omnivorous; its diet mainly consists of fruits of plants in the laurel family, Lauraceae, but it occasionally also preys on insects, lizards, frogs and snails.

The species is well known for its colorful and complex plumage that differs substantially between sexes. Males have iridescent green plumes, a red lower breast and belly, black innerwings and a white undertail, whilst females are duller and have a shorter tail. Grey lower breasts, bellies, and bills, along with bronze-green heads are characteristic of females. These birds hollow holes in decaying trees or use ones already made by woodpeckers as a nest site. They are known to take turns while incubating, males throughout the day and females at night. The female usually lays one to three eggs, which hatch in 17 to 19 days. The quetzal is an altitudinal migrant, migrating from the slopes to the canopy of the forest. This occurs during the breeding season, which varies depending on the location, but usually commences in March and extends as far as August.

The resplendent quetzal is considered near threatened on the IUCN Red List, with habitat destruction being the main threat. It has an important role in Mesoamerican mythology, and is closely associated with Quetzalcoatl, a deity. It is the national animal of Guatemala, being pictured on the flag and coat of arms; it also gives its name to the country's currency, the Guatemalan quetzal.

== Taxonomy ==
The resplendent quetzal was first described by Mexican naturalist Pablo de La Llave in 1832. It is one of five species of the genus Pharomachrus, commonly known as quetzals. Quetzal is usually specifically used to refer to the resplendent, but it typically applies to all members of the genera Pharomachrus and Euptilotis. Some scholars label the crested quetzal as a very close relative of the resplendent, and either suggest the crested quetzal to be a subspecies of the resplendent or the two form a superspecies. The quetzal clade is thought to have spread out from where it emerged in the Andes, the resplendent quetzal being the youngest species. The name of the genus, Pharomachrus, refers to the physical characteristics of the bird, with pharos meaning 'mantle' and makros meaning 'long' in Ancient Greek. The word 'quetzal' came from Nahuatl (Aztec), where quetzalli (from the root quetza, meaning 'stand') means 'tall upstanding plume' and then 'quetzal tail feather'; from that, Nahuatl quetzaltotōtl means 'quetzal-feather bird' and thus 'quetzal'.

Two subspecies are recognized, P. m. mocinno and P. m. costaricensis, although there is an ongoing debate about whether costaricensis should be recognized as a distinct species. The bird was named "Pharomachrus Mocinno" by Pablo de la Llave to honor an early Mexican naturalist, José Mariano Mociño, a member of a scientific expedition to Guatemala. The specific epithet mocinno is a Latinization of the Mociño surname.^{[note 1]}

== Description ==
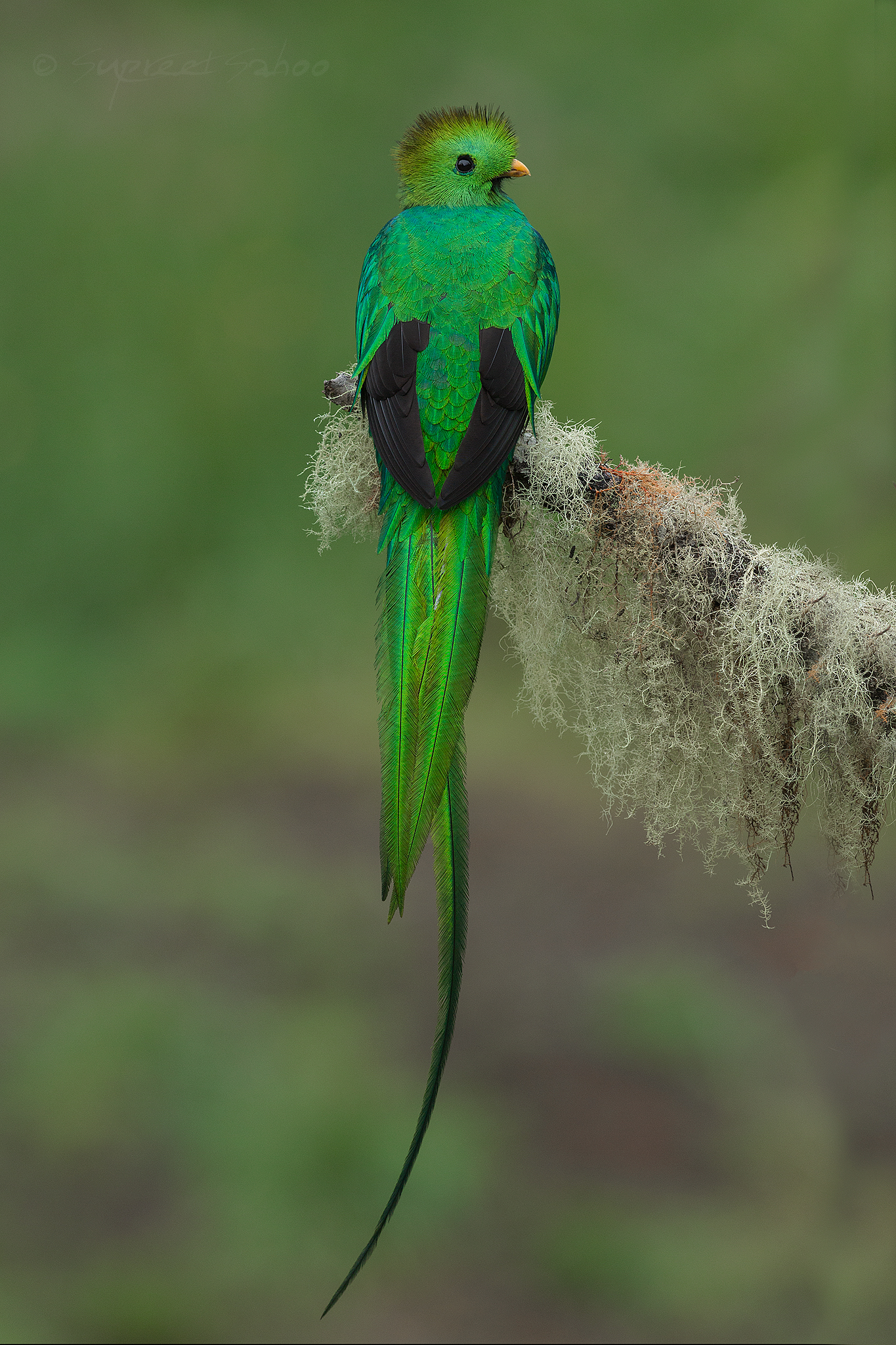
A resplendent quetzal found in the Talamanca cloud forests of Costa Rica

The resplendent quetzal is the largest trogon. It is 36 to 40 cm (14–16 in) long; in the nominate subspecies, the tail streamers measure between 31 cm (12 in) and 100.5 cm (39.6 in), with the median being 75 cm (30 in) for males. The nominate subspecies weighs about 210 g (7.4 oz), while the subspecies costaricensis is slightly smaller than the nominate race, with shorter wings and bills. The tail plumes are shorter and narrower, measuring between 32 cm (13 in) and 86 cm (34 in), with the median being 63 cm (25 in).

Resplendent quetzals have a green body (showing iridescence from green-gold to blue-violet) and a red lower breast and belly. Depending on the light, quetzal feathers can shine in a variant of colors: from green, cobalt, lime, and yellow to ultramarine. Their green upper tail coverts hide their tails and are particularly splendid in breeding males, being longer than the rest of the body. Though the quetzal's plumage appears green, they are actually brown due to the pigment melanin. The primary wing coverts are also unusually long and have a fringed appearance. The male has a helmet-like crest. The bill, which is partly covered by green filamentous feathers, is yellow in mature males and grey in females. Their iridescent feathers, which cause them to appear shiny and green like the canopy leaves, are a camouflage adaptation to hide within the canopy during rainy weather. The quetzal's skin is very thin and easily torn, so it has evolved thick plumage to protect its skin. It has large eyes, adapted to see in the dim light of the forest. Their song is an array of full-toned, mellow, slurred notes in plain patterns and is often remarkably melodious: keow, kowee, keow, k'loo, keeloo.

== Distribution and habitat ==
This species inhabits amidst lush vegetation, in specially moist rainforests at high elevations (900–3,200 m (3,000–10,500 ft)).^{[note 2]} They populate trees that make up the canopy and subcanopy of the rainforest, though they can also be found in ravines and cliffs. It prefers to live in decaying trees, stumps, and abandoned woodpecker hollows. The vivid colors of the quetzal are disguised by the rainforest. The resplendent quetzal can be found from southern Mexico (southernmost Oaxaca and Chiapas) to western Panama (Chiriquí). The ranges of the two subspecies differ: P. m. mocinno is found in southern Mexico, northern El Salvador, and northwestern Nicaragua, Guatemala and Honduras, while P. m. costaricensis is found in Costa Rica and western Panama. The geographical isolation between the two subspecies is caused by the Nicaraguan depression, a 50 km (31 mi) wide, 600 km (370 mi) long bottomland that contains the two largest lakes in Central America, Lake Managua and Lake Nicaragua, and the deficiency of the breeding habitats in regions adjoining to. The quetzal migrates from its breeding areas in the lower montane rainforest to the pre-montane rainforest on the Pacific slopes for three to four months (July–October), after which they move across the continental divide to the Atlantic slopes.

In the Guatemalan cloud forest corridor, key breeding microclimates are concentrated across the volcanic highlands and Verapaces routes, where protected montane canopy remnants maintain critical connectivity for resident subpopulations.

Quetzal's abundance in its mating areas is correlated with the total number of fruiting species, although the correlation between quetzal abundance and the number of fruiting Lauraceae species is only marginal.

== Behavior ==
Resplendent quetzals generally display shy and quiet behaviour to elude predators. In contrast, they are rather vocal during the mating season, and their behavior is designated to exhibit and attract mates. Their known predators include the ornate hawk-eagle, golden eagle, and other hawks and owls as adults, along with emerald toucanets, brown jays, long-tailed weasels, squirrels, and kinkajous as nestlings or eggs. The resplendent quetzal plays an important ecological role in the cloud forests, helping disseminate the seeds of at least 32 tree species.

=== Feeding ===
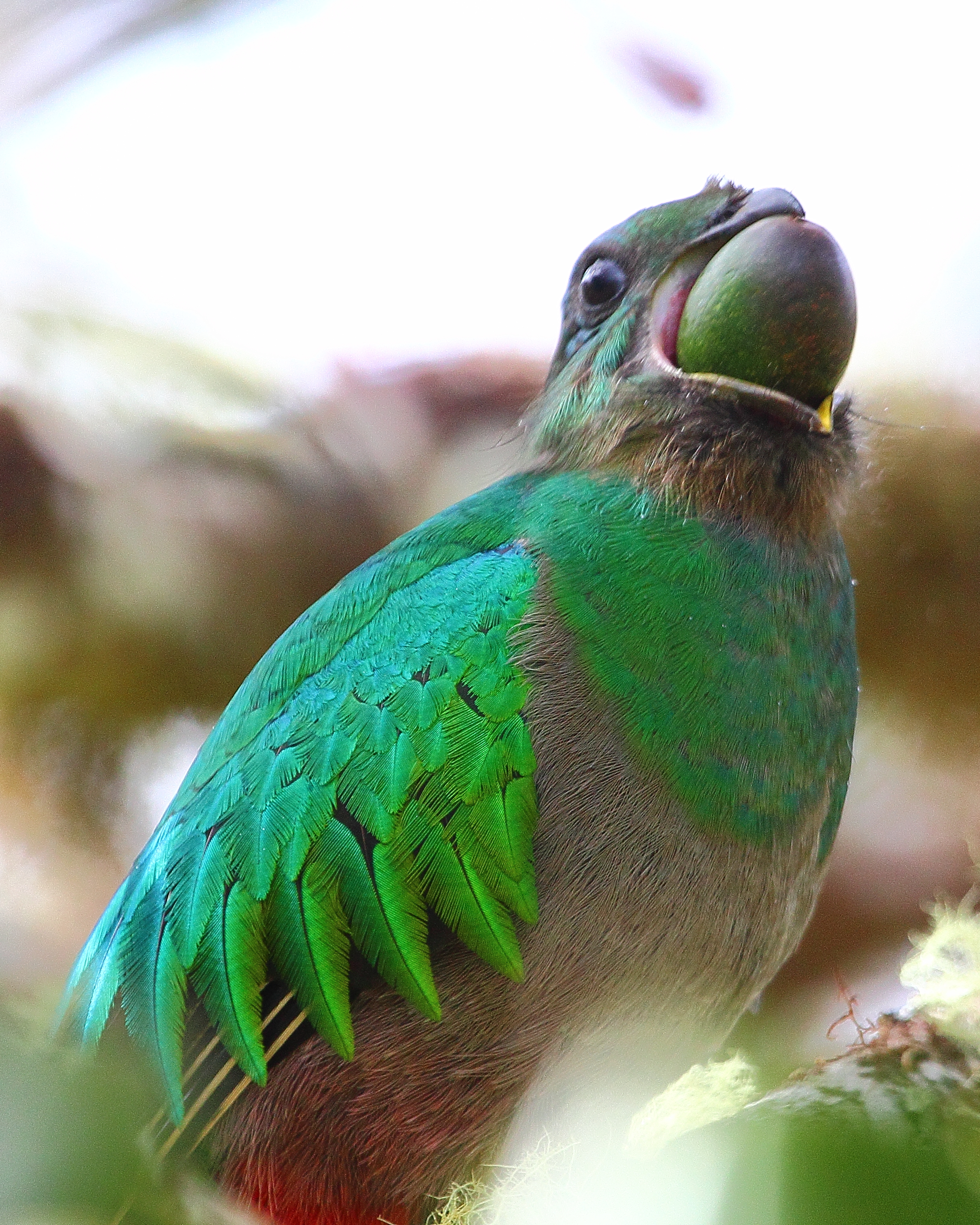
Female eating a wild avocado

Resplendent quetzals are considered specialized fruit-eaters, feeding on 41 to 43 species, although they also feed on insects (primarily wasps, ants, and larvae), frogs, lizards, and snails. Particularly important are the Symplococarpon purpusii and wild avocados, as well as other fruits of the laurel family, which the birds swallow whole before regurgitating the pits, which helps to disperse these trees. Quetzals feed more frequently in the midday hours. The adults eat a more fruit-based diet than the chicks, who eat insects primarily and some fruits. Over fifty percent of the fruit they eat are laurels. Quetzals use the methods of "hovering" and "stalling" in order to selectively pick the fruit from near the tips of the branches.

=== Breeding ===
Resplendent quetzals create their nests over 200 feet (60 m) up in the air and court in the air with specific calls. Six specific vocal calls have been recorded: the two-note whistle, gee-gee, wahc-ah-wahc, wec-wec, whistle, coouee, uwac, chatter, and buzzing. The first call is related to male territorial behavior, while the coouee whistle is a mating call. Resplendent quetzals usually live alone when not breeding. They are monogamous territorial breeders, with the size of their territory in Guatemala being 6–10 ha (15–25 acres). They are also seasonal breeders, with the breeding season lasting from March to April in Mexico, May to June in El Salvador, and March to May in Guatemala. When breeding, females lay one to three pale blue eggs with a mean of 38.9 millimetres (1.53 in) x 32.4 millimetres (1.28 in) in a nest placed in a hole which they carve in a rotten tree. Resplendent quetzals tend to lay two clutches per year and are known to have a high rate of nest failure, 67-78%. One of the most important factors when choosing a nest location for the quetzal is that the tree must be in a stage of decomposition and decay. They often reuse their previous sites. The height of nest stubs is 41 feet (10 m) and the nest holes 31 feet (9 m).

Both parents take turns at incubating, with their long tail coverts folded forwards over out of the hole, giving them the appearance of a bunch of fern growing out of the hole. The incubation period lasts about 17 to 19 days, during which the male generally incubates the eggs during the day while the female incubates them at night. When the eggs hatch, both parents take care of the young, feeding them entire fruits, such as berries and avocados, as early as the second day. However, chicks are primarily fed insects, lizards, snails and small frogs. It was observed that males generally give more food, namely insects, than females. Nestlings are often neglected and even abandoned by females near the end of the rearing period, leaving it up to the male to continue caring for the offspring until they are ready to survive on their own. During the incubation period, parents land and rotate their heads side to side before entering the nest, a process known as "bowing in". This process ends when the chicks hatch. Young quetzals begin flying after a month, but the distinctive long tail feathers can take three years to develop in males.

== Conservation status ==
Monteverde, Costa Rica

The population trend varies between subpopulations but is generally decreasing although certain populations may be increasing or are at least stable. It is classified as being near threatened on the IUCN Red List, with an estimated population of 20,000–49,999 individuals. Due to the remote habitat of the quetzal, more monitoring is required to confirm the rate of decline, and depending on the results it could lead to it moving to a higher threat category. In 2001, the quetzal survived only in 11 small, isolated patches of forest. Its biggest threats are habitat loss because of deforestation, forest fragmentation, and agricultural clearing. The quetzal is also sometimes hunted for food and trapped for illegal trading. Cloud forests, the resplendent quetzal's habitat, are one of the most threatened ecosystems in the world, but the species occurs in several protected areas such as the Children's Eternal Rainforest and is a sought-after species for birdwatchers and ecotourists.

It was thought that the resplendent quetzal could not be bred or held for a long time in captivity, and was noted for usually dying soon after being captured or caged as a result of assimilation of iron through water ingestion, with this now understood they are now given tannic acid and iron is avoided in their diet. For this reason, it is a traditional symbol of liberty. The national anthem of Guatemala even includes the verse "Antes muerto que esclavo será" (Be rather dead than a slave). However, the scientific discovery about the bird's susceptibility to iron has allowed some zoos, including Miguel Álvarez del Toro Zoo in Tuxtla Gutiérrez, Chiapas, to keep this species. Breeding in captivity was announced in 2004.

== In culture ==
The resplendent quetzal is the national animal of Guatemala and it appears on the flag and coat of arms of the country.

In pre-Columbian Mesoamerican civilizations, the quetzal was associated with Quetzalcoatl, the feathered-serpent god of life, light, knowledge and the winds. Its scintillating green tail feathers, thought to symbolize spring plant growth, were venerated by the Aztec and Maya. The Maya also regarded the quetzal as representative of freedom (on account of quetzals dying in captivity) and with wealth (due to the value of their feathers.) Mesoamerican rulers and some high-ranking nobles wore diadems adorned with quetzal feathers, symbolically linking them to Quetzalcoatl. Since the killing of quetzals was forbidden under Maya and Aztec law, the bird was merely seized, its prolonged tail feathers deplumed, and set loose. In ancient Mayan culture, quetzal feathers were considered so precious that they were used as a medium of exchange, leading to the name of the Guatemalan currency, the quetzal. In various Mesoamerican languages, the word quetzal has a secondary meaning of precious, sacred, or king, warrior, prince.

One Mayan legend has it that a resplendent quetzal accompanied the hero, Tecún Umán, prince of the Quiché (K'iche') Maya, during his battle against Spanish conquistador Pedro de Alvarado. Tecún, equipped with just an arrow and bow, nevertheless is able to incapacitate Alvarado's horse on the first strike. Alvarado was then given a second horse and counter-charged against Tecún, running his chest through with a spear. A quetzal flew down and alighted on Tecún's body, drenching its chest in his blood. It was then that the species, which used to be completely green, obtained its characteristic red chest feathers. Additionally, from that day on, the quetzal, which sang delightfully before the Spanish conquest, has been mute ever since; it will sing anew solely when the land is fully liberated.

== Gallery ==
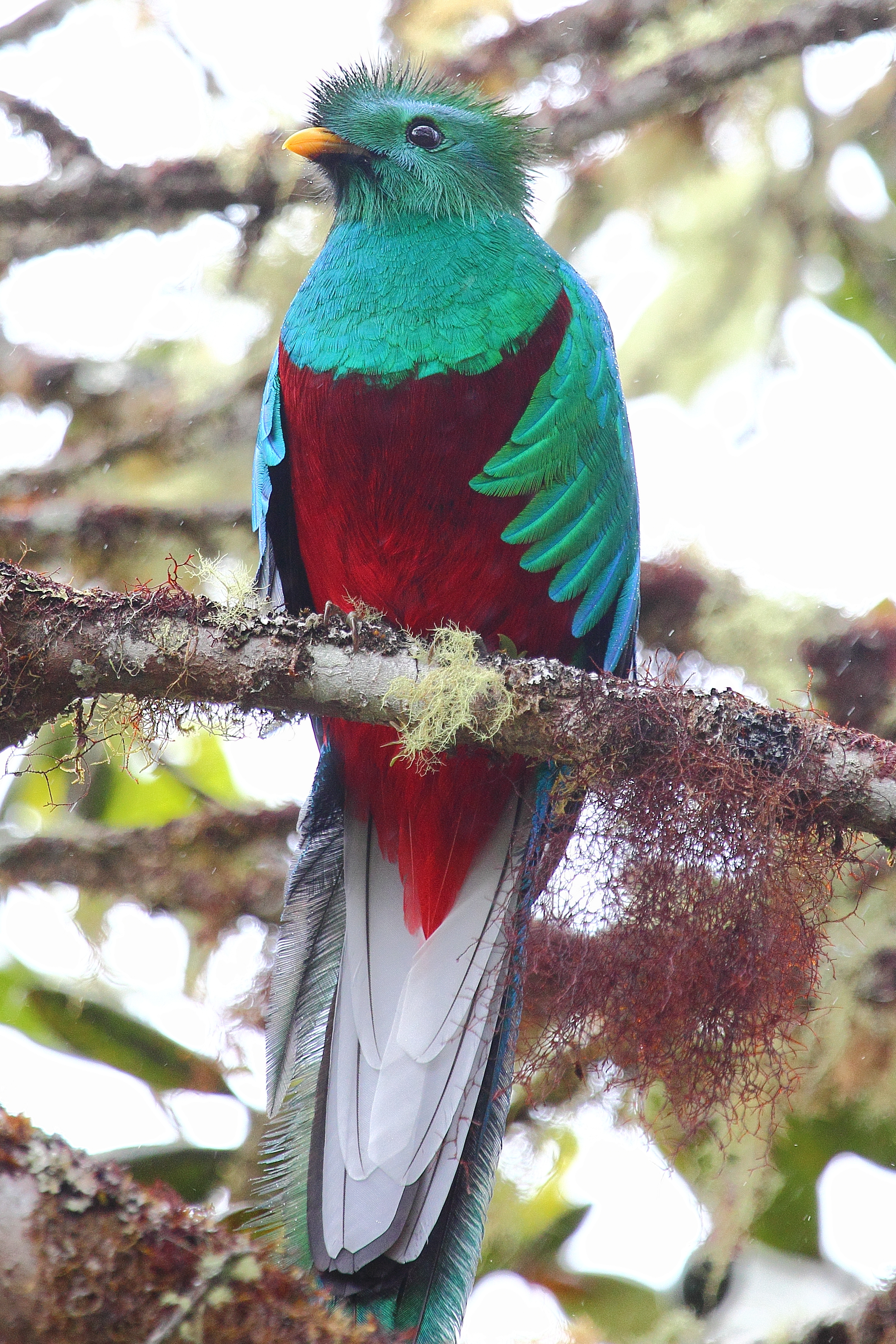
Male standing on a branch

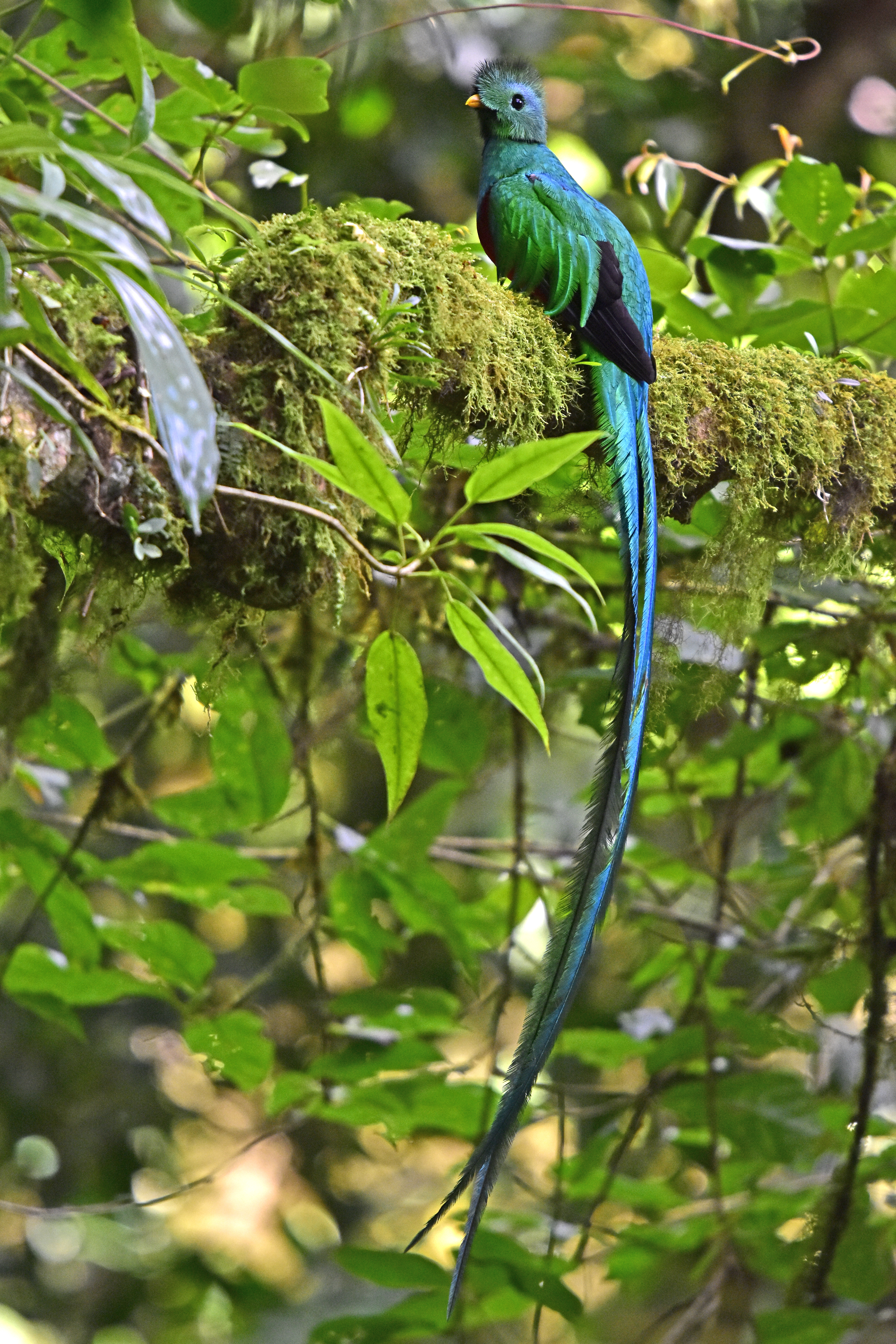
Male displaying his long tail

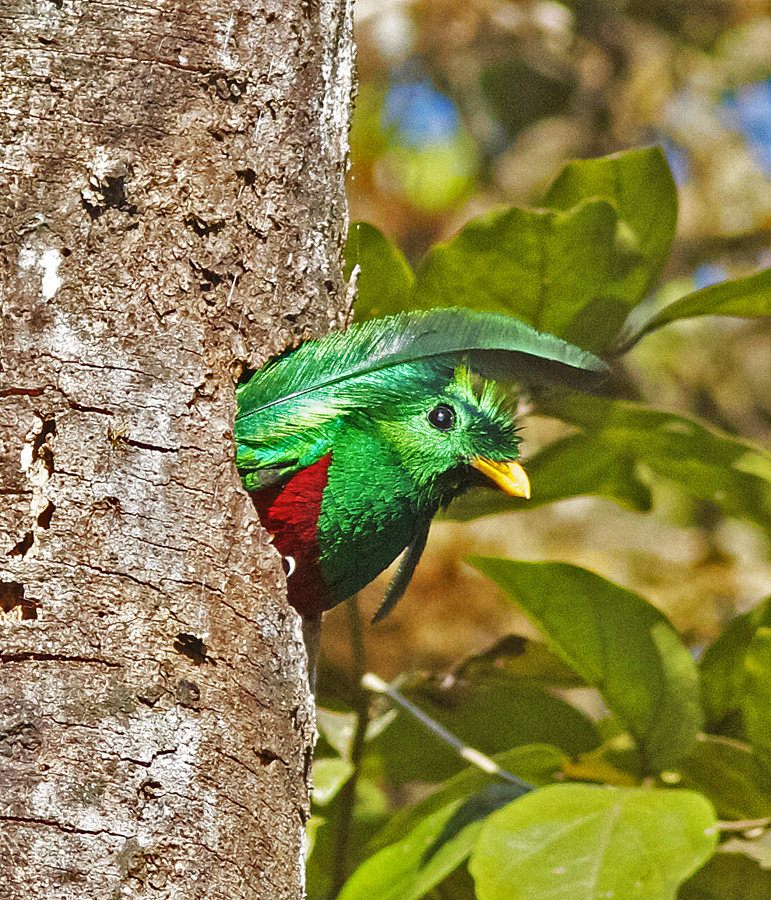
Male peeking through a nest hole

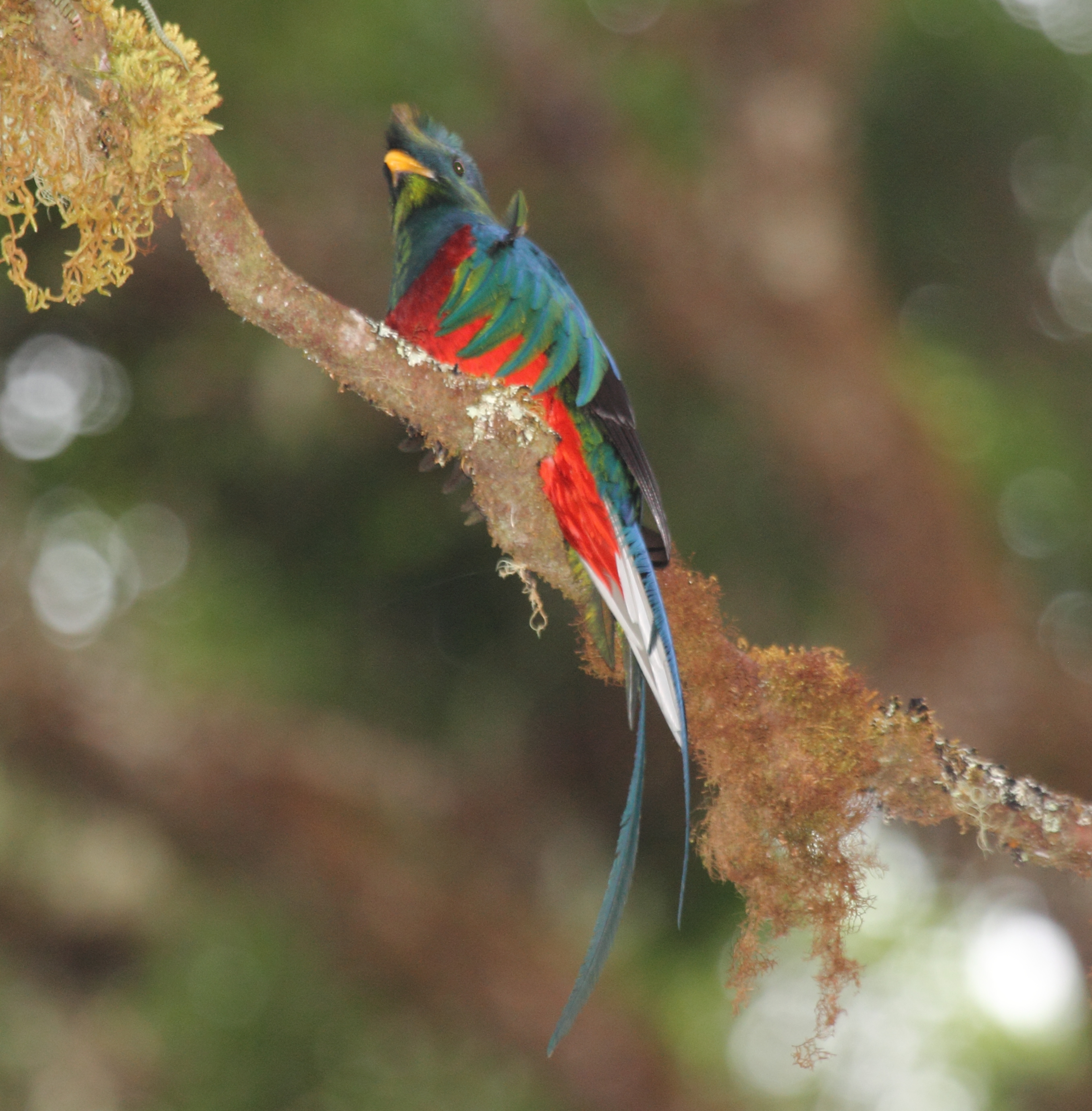
Male in Costa Rica from below

== Notes ==
It is sometimes spelled mocino, but "ñ" was formerly spelled "nn" in Spanish, so the spelling with "nn" is justified and nonetheless now official.
There is some variation between sources, some cite that the span is between 1,000–3,000 m (3,300–9,800 ft) while others claim elevations of 1,300–3,000 m (4,300–9,800 ft).

== Sources ==
- Atkins, Edward G.; Kimber, Rita; Kimber, Robert, eds. (1991). Vanishing Eden: The Plight of the Tropical Rain Forest. Barrons Educational Series, Inc. ISBN 0-8120-6246-9.
- Henderson, Carrol L.; Adams, Steve; Skutch, Alexander F. (2010). Birds of Costa Rica: A Field Guide. Austin: University of Texas Press. pp. 176–177. ISBN 978-0-292-71965-1.
- Howell, Steve N. G.; Webb, Sophie (1995). A Guide to the Birds of Mexico and Northern Central America. Oxford University Press. ISBN 0-19-854012-4.
- Williamson, Sheri L.; Colston, P.R. (2003). "Trogons". In Christopher Perrins (ed.). Firefly Encyclopedia of Birds. Firefly Books. pp. 362–363. ISBN 1-55297-777-3.
